= County of Saarwerden =

State of the Holy Roman Empire (1111–1527)

Coordinates: 48.94°N 7.08°E

County of Saarwerden: Comté de Sarrewerden (French); Grafschaft Saarwerden (German)
- 1111–1527
- Coat of arms

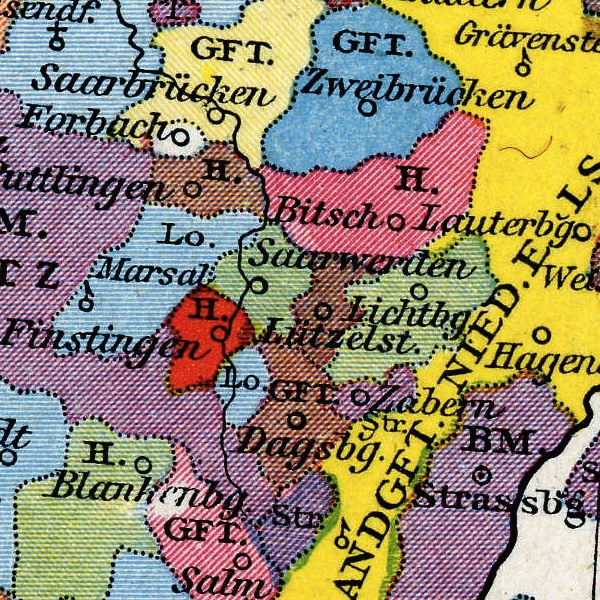
- County of Saarwerden in 1397 (light green)
- Status: State of Lorraine (part of the Holy Roman Empire): Personal union with County of Moers; (1397-1417); Occupied by Sweden; (1633-1635)
- Capital: Bockenheim (now Sarre-Union)
- Religion: Catholicism; Protestantism
- Government: County
- Count
  - 1111-1131: Friedrich I (first)
  - 1397-1417: Frederick III
  - 1527-1545: John Louis
  - 1794-1797: Heinrich Ludwig I (last)
- History
  - Established: 1111
  - Inherited by Nassau-Saarbrücken: 1527
  - Final official Count dies: 1797
Preceded by	Succeeded by
Prince-Bishopric of Metz	Nassau-Saarbrücken
- Today part of: Bas-Rhin

The County of Saarwerden (German: Grafschaft Saarwerden; French: Comté de Sarrewerden) was a county located in Lorraine, within the Holy Roman Empire. As a second-level fief, it belonged to its local ruler and not to the emperor. Its capital was in Bockenheim (situated on the right side of the Saar) and later in New Saarwerden or Ville Neuve de Sarrewerden (on the left side of the Saar), both in the present city of Sarre-Union. Today, the area of the county belongs to Bas-Rhin, Alsace.

== History ==
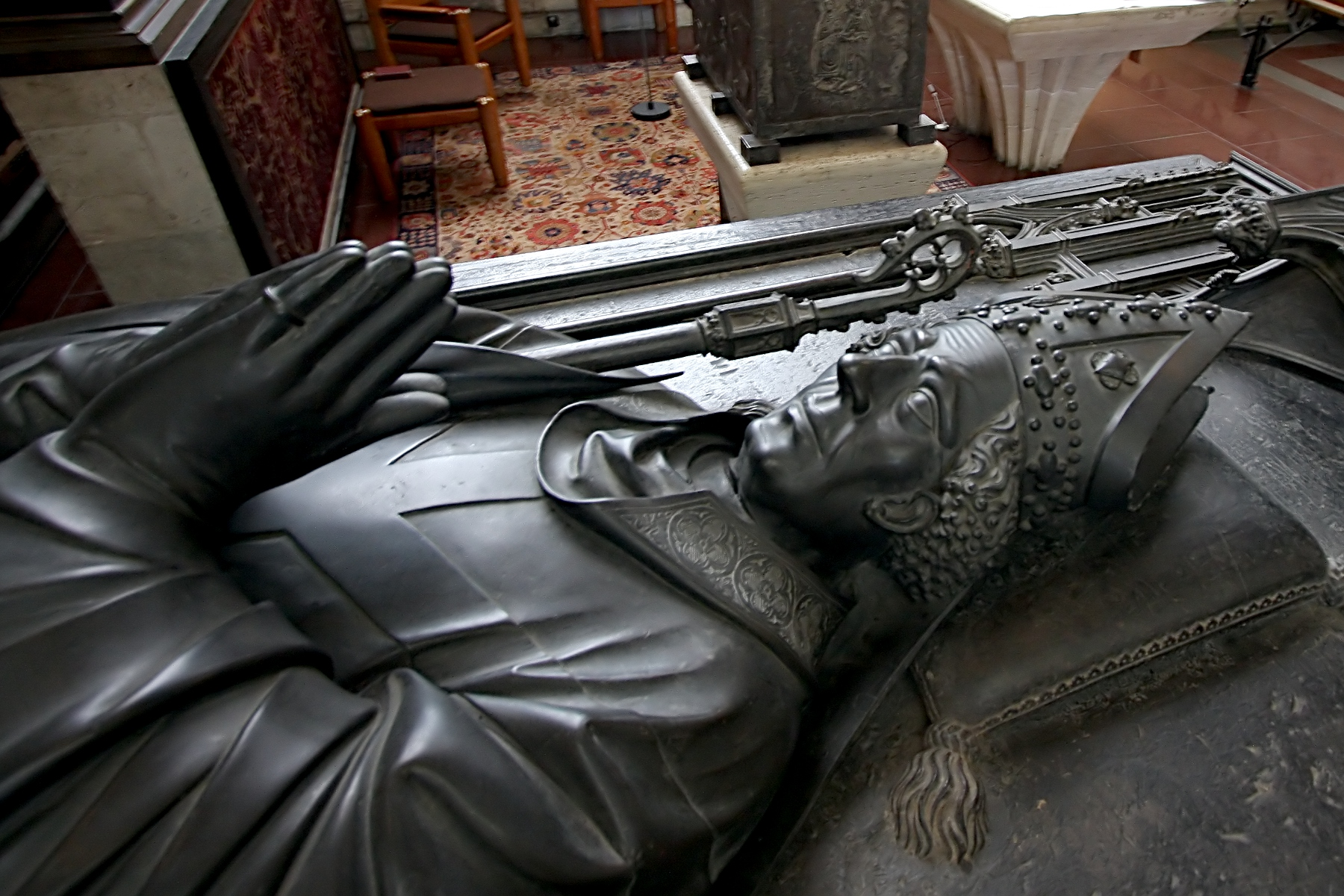
Archbishop Friedrich III, laid to rest in Cologne Cathedral.

In 1047, Emperor Heinrich III of the Holy Roman Empire established the Duchy of Lorraine from the former Duchy of Upper Lorraine. During the troubles that agitated the duchy, some lords rebelled and became more or less, independent of the Duke. Saarwerden branched from the Bishopric of Metz, when lord Friedrich, son of Godfrey I of Blieskastel separated and formed the County of Saarwerden. Thus the county was created under the House of Saarwerden in 1111. Friedrich built a castle in Sarrwerden upon the ruins of an ancient Roman bath. He and his wife Gertrude also founded the Abbey Wörschweiler in 1130.

The most famous representative of this family was Friedrich III. He was Archbishop of Cologne from 1370 to 1414. On the death of his childless brother Heinrich II, the last Count of Saarwerden, in 1397, Friedrich temporarily directed the county before ceding the government to his stepbrother, Friedrich III, Count of Moers.

Now the county was in personal union under Friedrich as the County of Moers-Saarwerden. In 1417, the County of Saarwerden branched off once more as the inheritance of his son, Johann. The House of Moers-Saarwerden died to the House of Nassau and County of Saarbrücken in 1527; through jure uxoris, Johann Ludwig of Nassau-Saarbrücken inherited the lands of his wife, Countess Katharina I.

=== The Reformation ===
The county was passed into the House of Nassau. Count Johann Ludwig attempted to usurp the authority of the Bishopric of Metz in the county by dissolving the Benedictine Abbey in 1554. After the Abbey was demolished in 1557, The Bishopric of Metz was annexed into France, and the land passed to Lorraine. Old property disputes with Lorraine were a subject of contention during this time.

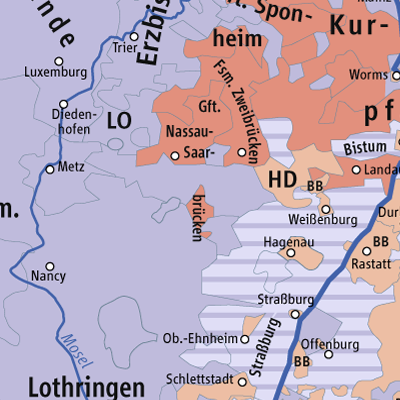
The Calvinist County of Saarwerden surrounded by Catholic Lorraine.

Count Adolf introduced the Reformation into Saarwerden in 1556. He allowed Protestant refugees fleeing religious persecution in the Kingdom of France and the Duchy of Lorraine. He approved the settlement of what became known as 'Seven Gallic Villages': Altwiller, Burbach, Diedendorf, Eywiller, Gœrlingen, Kirrberg, and Rauwiller. Thus, the county was populated with Calvinists who spoke French, while the rest of the county were Lutheran Germans. The County of Saarwerden become an experimental model of peace between Lutherans and Calvinists. Since Adolf died childless, the County fell back to his Catholic brother, Johann V. Johann did not persecute the Protestants, however.

There was much contention between the Catholic Lorraine and the newly Protestant Saarwerden. When Protestant Philip II inherited the lands in 1574, Duke Charles III of Lorraine demanded Saarwerden back as a completed fief (meaning Philip was without any heirs). The dispute went on for many years and threatened several times to escalate to military level. The Elector Palatine, Frederick III also claimed parts of the inheritance. Here too, the House of Nassau managed to prevail on the essential points. Several large treaties were closed, in which the exact rights and boundaries of the Nassau and Palatinate territories were defined.

In 1575 Philip introduced the Reformation in his territories. Catholic priests were converted to the new faith or removed from office; church property was confiscated; schools were established and patronage was acquired. His implementation of the Reformation intensified his disputes with the Duchy of Lorraine, which was still Catholic. The County grew and prospered under Philip's son Ludwig IV. The Thirty Years' War also started in this time.

=== The war against Lorraine and the Empire ===
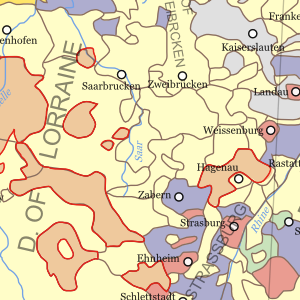
County of Saarwerden, when occupied by the Duchy of Lorraine before the Treaty of Westphalia.

In 1629, Emperor Ferdinand II issued the Edict of Restitution, by which church property that had been confiscated after 1552 under the Peace of Passau, was returned to its previous owner. Based on this Edict, the Prince Bishops of Mainz and Trier claimed substantial parts of the possessions of the Nassau family. The Court of Appeal ruled in 1629 in a dispute between Lorraine and Nassau, that the city and county of Saarwerden and Bockenheim and Wieberstweiler were fiefs of Metz and should therefore be returned to Lorraine, and the Nassau family could keep the rest of their county.

The Duke of Lorraine, however, took possession of the whole of the County of Saarwerden and the Lordship of Herbitzheim. Count Wilhelm Ludwig appealed and took the case to the Imperial Council of Princes Because he had refused to join the Catholic League, or to provide troops, the Emperor ignored him. In 1631, King Gustav Adolph II of Sweden and his army arrived at the Rhine. Wilhelm Ludwig joined him, effectively declaring war on the Emperor.

The Saarwerdische eagle in the coat-of-arms of Wilhelm Ludwig of Nassau, representing the Counties Moers, Saarwerden, Saarbrücken, (In the heart shield) Lahr, and Mahlberg.

In 1633, the Swedish army attacked from the Alsace into the County of Saarwerden, which was still occupied by Lorraine. The county was conquered, but not given back to the House of Nassau.

In 1635, Count Wilhelm Ludwig went to Frankfurt to attend a meeting of the Protestant states and their allies. At this meeting, it was decided that Sweden would return Saarwerden to the House of Nassau. The family went to Bockenheim, where the counties of Nassau-Saarbrücken and Saarwerden should have been handed over. However, on 30 May 1635, a number of imperial estates, including the Electorates of Brandenburg and Saxony, had concluded the Peace of Prague and the Nassau Counts were expressly excluded from this agreement. They then went to Saarbrücken.

In November 1635, the imperial commissioner appeared in the Nassau lands and declared the Count had forfeited his counties and all their possessions; he was banned. The Emperor gave the Duke of Lorraine the counties of Saarbrücken and Saarwerden and the bailiwick of Herbitzheim and the fortress of Homburg on the Blies as a reward for services rendered. In 1636, Wilhelm Ludwig attempted to petition the Emperor for an imperial pardon from Metz, where he was in exile. This attempt failed, but it was not until 1637 that the counts were told the reasons for this imperial wrath. Only in 1639 did the Count receive a pass that enabled them to represent their cause in Vienna in person.

=== Restoration of Saarwerden ===
Wilhelm Ludwig died in 1640, and his wife, now Countess, and his son Johann Ludwig II returned to Saarbrücken. The Peace of Westphalia restored the lands of the House of Nassau. Johann Ludwig II rose to Count at the death of his mother. Because of the dispute with Lorraine, The House of Nassau had to abandon their capital of Bouquenom (Bockenheim) and the city of Sarrewerden, which had belonged to the Bishopric of Metz, which was now owned by Lorraine. They built on the opposite side of the river Saar, a new city: Neu-Saarwerden. The county had suffered from the Thirty Years' War. Count Gustav Adolph set about rebuilding the war-ravaged county, bringing back refugees, and recruiting settlers for agriculture and skilled workers. Later, Gustav became a prisoner-of-war of France and France occupied Saarwerden. After the Treaty of Ryswick in 1697, his lands were returned to Ludwig Crato I and he became Regent. He was considered a good ruler, as he could keep his country out of further wars. He organized the administration of justice and the state finances. He showed benevolence and reorganized the school system.

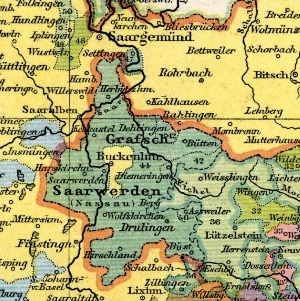
The county was restored in 1648, although Lorraine acquired the capital of Bouquenom (Bockenheim).

=== Neu-Saarwerden ===
After the expansion of France into much of Alsace and the annexation of the Duchy of Lorraine in 1766, the County of Saarwerden was an enclave of the Holy Roman Empire in France. At the time, Nassau-Saarbrücken measured about 12 square miles and it had 22,000 inhabitants. This made it one of the smallest principalities in the Holy Roman Empire.

Wilhelm Heinrich I reformed the administration and justice, separating these two branches of government. He took measures to standardize taxes and introduced a modern cadastre on the Austrian model. He also promoted modern agricultural methods, such as the potato cultivation and pest control. He was also involved in coal mining and iron smelting and he nationalized the mines . He laid the basis for a proto-industrialized economy, which would later evolve into the highly industrialized Saarland region. Despite the increase in revenues, his financial situation did not improve, due to the high spending on construction activities. After his father's death in 1768, Ludwig took up the business of government in Nassau-Saarbrücken. He largely continued his father's economic policies, but was increasingly subject to financial constraints. He issued new regulations for agriculture and forestry and reformed the school system. He also reformed the penal code and abolished torture.

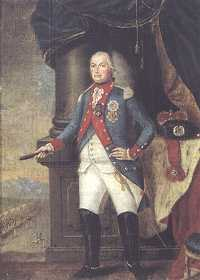
Ludwig V, last ruling Prince of Nassau-Saarbrücken (1745–1794).

The County came to be divided into three districts in 1783:

- Bouquenom (Bockenheim), went to France in 1766 with the possessions of the Duchy of Lorraine.
- The Bailiwick of Neuf-Sarrewerden (German: Neu-Saarwerden), covered the northern part of the county, consisting of eleven localities: Burbach, Eywiller, Herbitzheim, Keskastel, Neu-Saarwerden, Bischtroff, Rimsdorf, Schopperten, Siltzheim, Vœllerdingen, and Zollingen. These would belong to the princes of Nassau-Weilburg.
- The Bailiwick of Harskirchen (German: Oberamt Harskirchen), covering the rest of the county, consisting of 29 localities, would belong to the princes of Nassau-Saarbrücken.

When Ludwig V died in 1794, the county was occupied by French troops so his son, Heinrich Ludwig I never reigned. He was the last Count of Nassau-Saarbrücken. Heinrich Ludwig died in 1797, leaving the county to his cousin Karl Wilhelm of Nassau-Usingen. However, under the Treaty of Lunéville, the territories on the left bank of the Rhine were lost to France. The Reichsdeputationshauptschluss of 1803 compensated Karl Wilhelm.

The former County of Saarwerden passed into France as the Sarrewerden District of Bas-Rhin in 1793 (See Alsace bossue).

== Counts of Saarwerden ==
=== House of Saarwerden (1111–1397) ===
- 1111–1131 Friedrich I, first Count of Saarwerden ∞ Gertrude of Lorraine
- 1131–1166 Folmar I, son of Friedrich I ∞ Stephanie, daughter of Dietrich II of Montbéliard
- 1166–1200 Ludwig I 'The Elder', son of Folmar I ∞ Gertrude, daughter of Hugo of Dabo
- 1200–1212 Ludwig II 'The Younger', brother of Ludwig I, son of Folmar I ∞ ?
- 1212–1246 Ludwig III, son of Ludwig I ∞ Agnes, daughter of Heinrich I of Zweibrücken
- 1240–1288 Heinrich I, son of Ludwig III ∞ Elisabet of Meisenburg
- 1288–1317 Johann I, son of Heinrich I ∞ Feriata of Leiningen
- 1317–1361 Friedrich II, son of Johann I ∞ Agnes of Salm-Obersalm
- 1361–1380 Johann II, son of Friedrich II ∞ Clara of Finstingen
- 1380–1397 Heinrich II, son of Johann II ∞ ?
- 1397 Friedrich III, brother of childless Heinrich II, son of Johann II, Archbishop of Cologne
- 1397–1417 Walpurga I, sister of Heinrich II, Friedrich III, daughter of Johann II ∞ Friedrich IV, Count of Moers

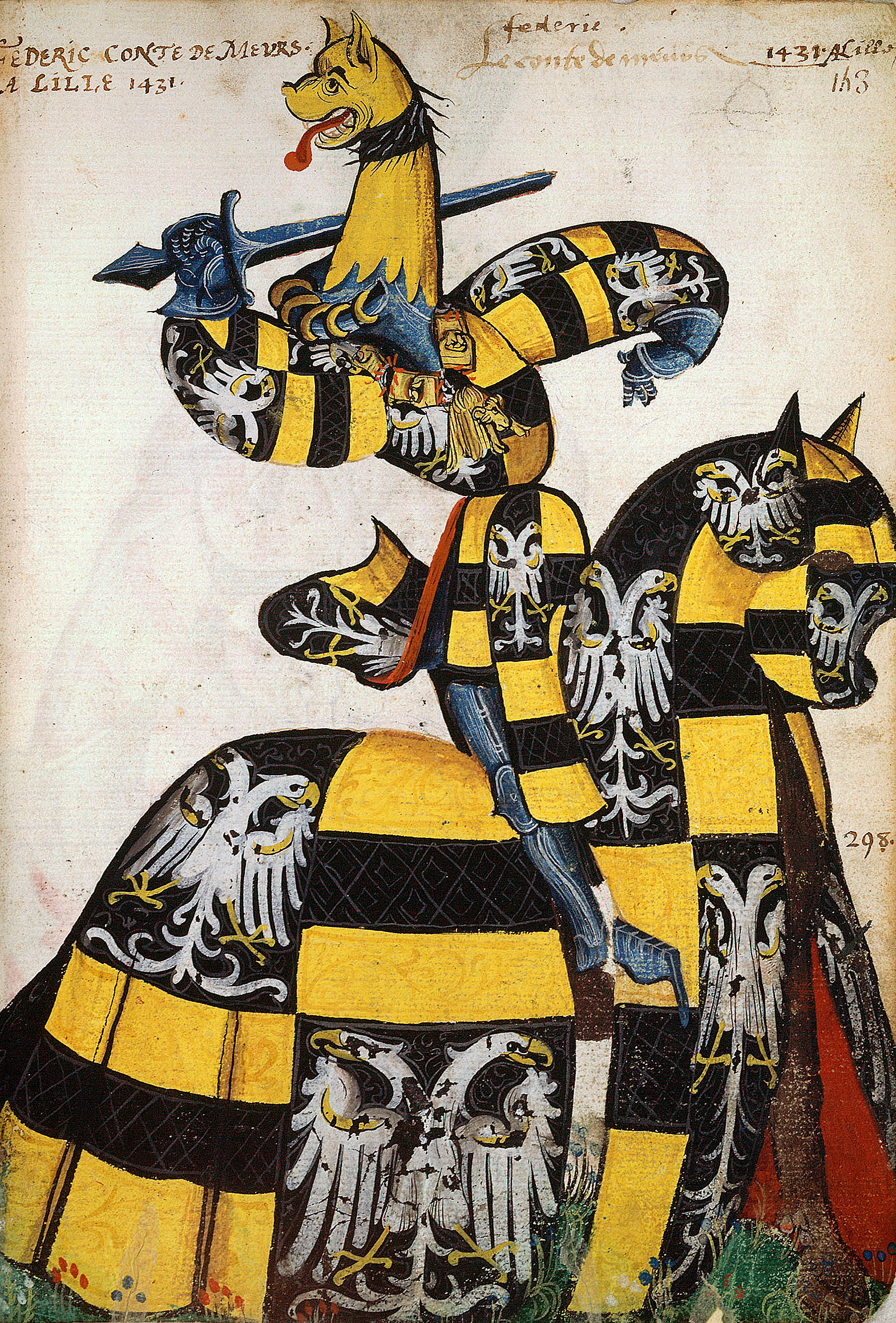
Friedrich IV, Count von Moers-Saarwerden.

=== House of Moers-Saarwerden (1397–1527) ===
- 1397–1417 Friedrich IV, husband of Walpurga, Count of Moers-Saarwerden ∞ Walpurga, Countess of Saarwerden
- 1417–1431 Johann III, Count of Saarwerden, son of Friedrich IV ∞ Adelaide of Geroldseck
- 1431–1483 Jacob I, son of Johann III ∞ Kunigunde of Sonnenberg
- 1483–1527 Johann IV, son of Jacob I ∞ Anne of Berg
- 1527–1545 Katharina I daughter of Johann IV ∞ Johann Ludwig, Count of Nassau-Saarbrücken

=== House of Nassau-Saarbrücken (1527–1799) ===
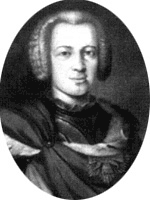
Karl I, Prince of Nassau-Usingen.

- 1527–1545 Johann Ludwig I, husband of Katharina, Count of Nassau-Saarbrücken ∞ Katharina I, Countess of Saarwerden
- 1545–1554 Philip I, son of Johann Ludwig I ∞ Catherine of Leiningen-Hartenberg
- 1554–1559 Adolf I, brother of Philip II, son of Johann Ludwig I
- 1559–1574 Johann V, brother of childless Philip I and Adolph ∞ Adelaide of Kronenkracht; Elisabeth Selz
- 1574–1602 Philip II, cousin of Johann V, Count of Nassau-Saarbrücken-Weilburg ∞ Erika of Manderscheid-Blankenheim; Elisabeth of Nassau-Dillenburg
- 1602–1627 Ludwig IV, nephew of Philip II ∞ Anna Maria of Hesse-Kassel
- 1627–1640 Wilhelm Ludwig I, son of Ludwig IV, Count of Nassau-Saarbrücken ∞ Anna Amalia of Baden-Durlach
- 1640–1642 Crato I, son of Wilhelm Ludwig I
- 1642–1651 Anna Amalia I, mother of Crato, wife of Wilhelm Ludwig I, Countess ∞ Wilhelm Ludwig I
- 1651–1659 Johann Ludwig II, son of Anna Amalia and Wilhelm Ludwig ∞ Countess Palatine Dorothea Catherine of Birkenfeld-Bischweiler
- 1659–1677 Gustav Adolph I, brother of Johann Ludwig II, son of Wilhelm Ludwig I ∞ Eleonore Klara of Hohenlohe-Neuenstein
- 1677–1713 Ludwig Crato I, son of Gustav Adolph ∞ Countess Philippine Henriette of Hohenlohe-Langenburg

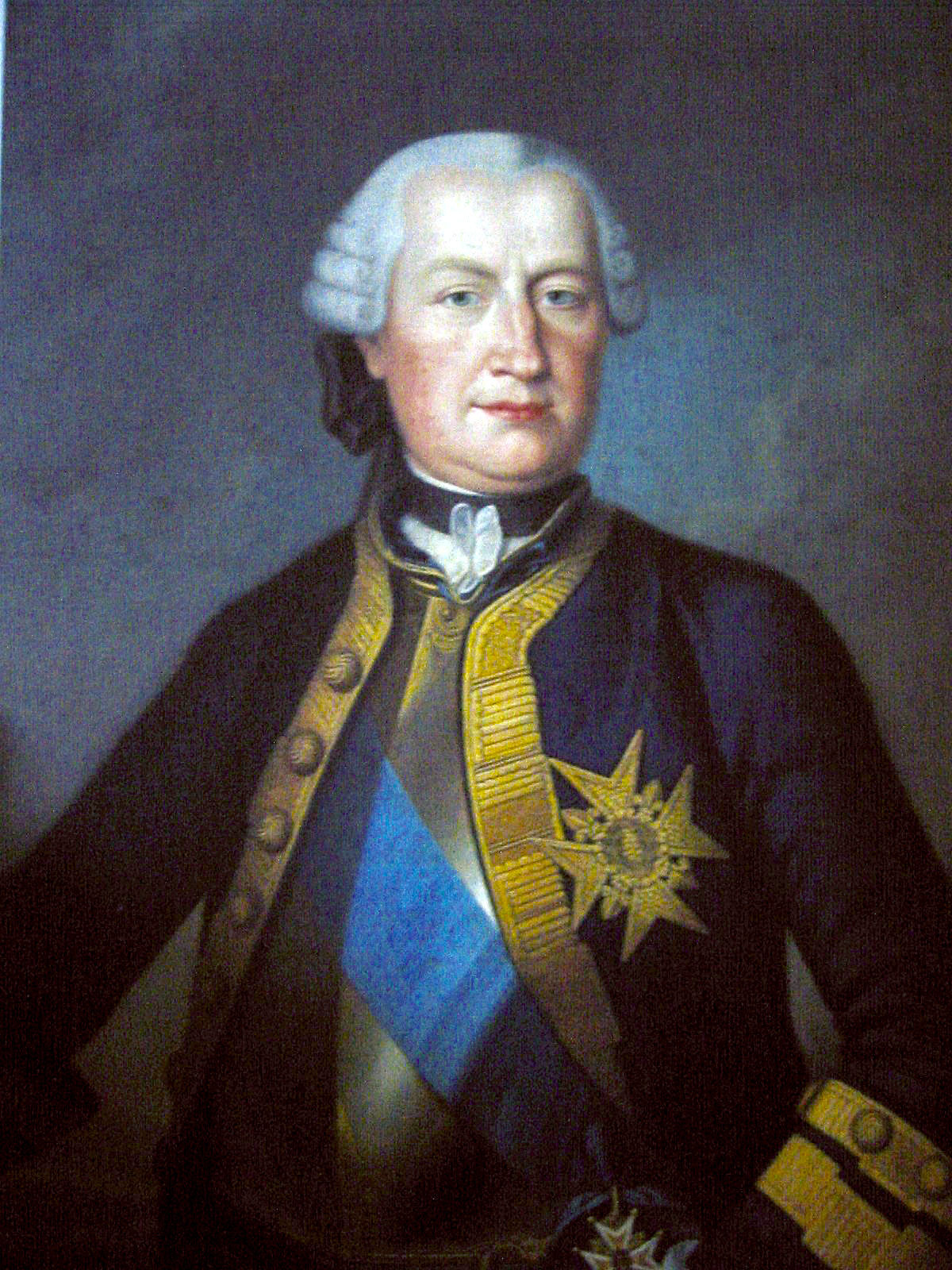
Wilhelm Heinrich, Prince of Nassau-Saarbrücken (1718–1768).

- 1713–1723 Karl Ludwig I, brother of Ludwig Crato, son of Gustav Adolf ∞ Christiane Charlotte of Nassau-Ottweiler
- 1723–1728 Friedrich Ludwig I, cousin of Karl Ludwig I ∞ Christiane, daughter of Frederick Ahlefeldt
- 1728–1735 Karl I, cousin of Friedrich Ludwig I ∞ Christine Wilhelmine Duchess of Saxe-Eisenachcken (1718–1768)
- 1735–1768 Wilhelm Heinrich, brother of Karl I ∞ Sophie, daughter of Count George William of Erbach
- 1768–1794 Ludwig V, son of Wilhelm Heinrich ∞ Wilhelmine of Schwarzburg-Rudolstadt
- 1794–1797 Heinrich Ludwig I, son of Ludwig V, last Count of Saarbrücken and Saarwerden
