= Provinces of France =

Subdivisions of the Kingdom of France

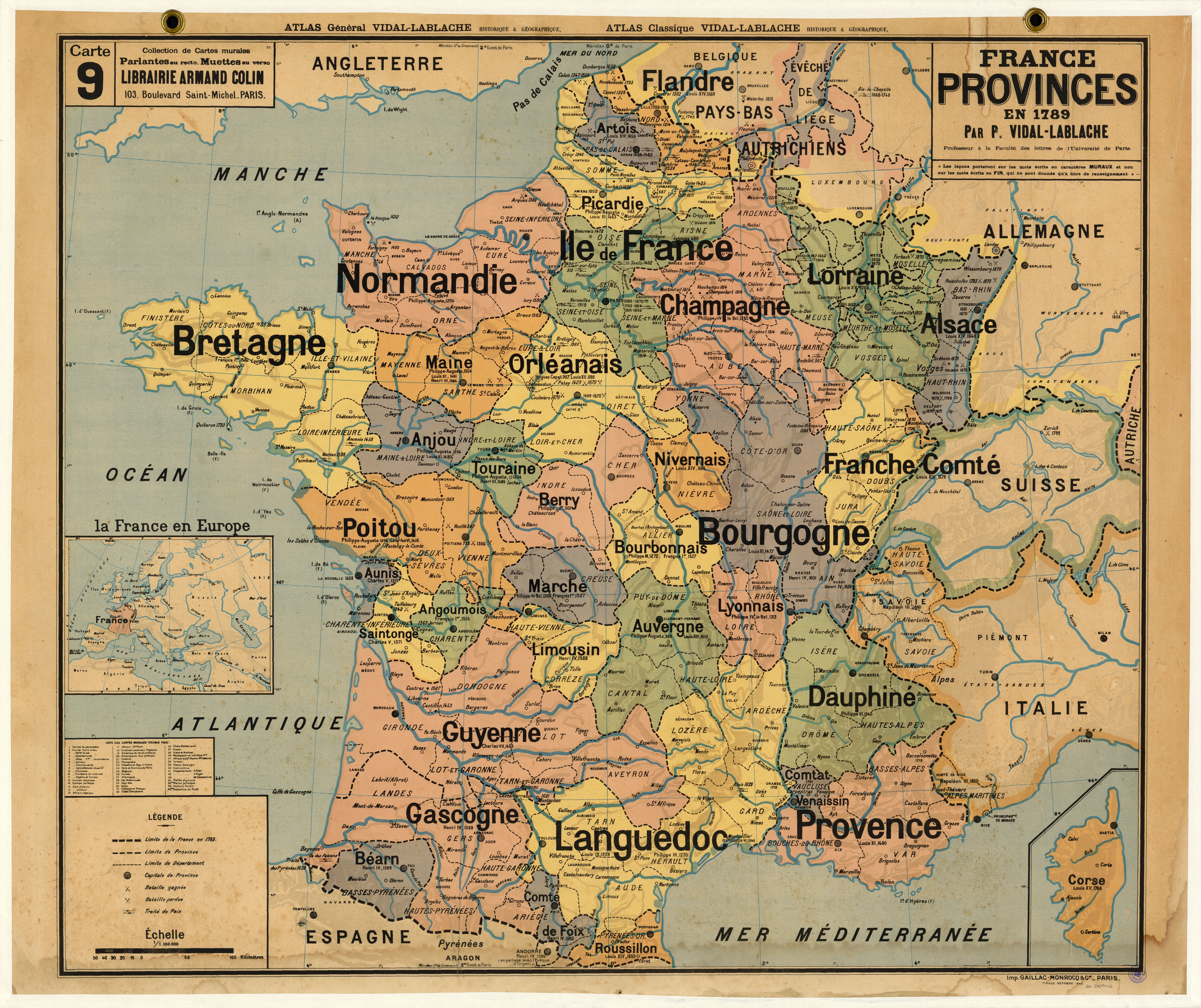
Map of the provinces of France in 1789. They were abolished the following year.

Under the Ancien Régime, the Kingdom of France was subdivided in multiple different ways (judicial, military, ecclesiastical, etc.) into several administrative units, until the National Constituent Assembly adopted a more uniform division into departments (départements) and districts in late 1789. The provinces (French pronunciation: [pʁɔvɛ̃s]) continued to exist administratively until 21 September 1791.

The country was subdivided ecclesiastically into dioceses, judicially into généralités, militarily into general governments. None of these entities was called "province" by their contemporaries. However, later interpretations confused the term of "general government" (a military division) with that of a cultural province, since the general governments often used the names and borders of a province. It was not always the case, which causes confusion as to the borders of some provinces.

Today, the term "province" is used to name the resulting regional areas, which retain a cultural and linguistic identity.

Borrowed from the institutions of the Roman Empire, the word first appeared in the 15th century and has continued to spread, both in official documents and in popular or common usage. Whatever the century or dictionary consulted, the definition of the word often remains vague, due to the coexistence of several territorial division systems under the Ancien Régime. Some geographers, even some of the most famous, such as Onésime Reclus, have widely criticised the idea of provinces and provincial identity, sometimes denying that the word covers any tangible reality. In fact, the many lists and maps showing the provinces of France are neither perfectly superimposable nor exactly comparable. The fact remains, however, that the names of many of the territorial subdivisions of the Ancien Régime refer to Gallic civitates.

Before the French Revolution, France was made up of territorial divisions resulting from history, geography and settlement, which differed according to the different powers that were exercised there, with different categories such as metropolises, dioceses, duchies, baronies, governments, states, elections, generalities, intendances, parliaments, countries, bailliages, seneschaussées, etc. Each of these categories took the name of a province, without covering the same geographical area. For example, the jurisdiction of the parlement d'Artois did not correspond to the same territory as the gouvernement d'Artois or the intendance d'Artois.

The Constituent Assembly of 1789, having abolished all the rights and customs specific to the different regions (also known as privileges, such as those of the classes, nobility and clergy) during the night of 4 August, decided to establish a uniform division of the territory, the départements, and that this division would be the same for the different functions of the State: military, religious, fiscal, administrative, university, judicial, etc. The town chosen as the capital of each department would have to be the seat of each of these functions, and at the same time have a prefecture, a court, a university, a military post, a bishopric, a stock exchange, a fair, a hospital, etc. The protests of the towns which had always fulfilled one of these functions and which were thus deprived of their court of appeal, their arsenal, their university or their fair, prevented this plan from being completely implemented.

In some cases, modern regions share names with the historic provinces; their borders may cover roughly the same territory.

== History and preceding divisions ==
=== Gallish civitates ===
It's worth noting that the old Gallic states retained their names, their boundaries and a kind of moral existence in people's memories and affections until very recently. Neither the Romans, nor the Germans, nor feudalism, nor monarchy destroyed these enduring units; they can still be found in the provinces and countries of present-day France.

— Numa Denis Fustel de Coulanges, Histoire des institutions politiques de l'ancienne France

Gaul was occupied by fifty-four main peoples and more than a hundred individual peoples (300 according to Flavius Josephus), some with very different customs. Julius Caesar called each of these independent states civitas (city, without the word in this case referring to the idea of town or village), some of which were subdivided into pagi. Many of the smaller Gallic peoples were clients of their neighbors, and therefore dependent on them, sometimes paying them tribute. These confederations, the best-known of which are those of the Arverni, Aedui and Armoricans, formed a kind of province before Roman reorganization.

The Gallic cities, with their territory and the name given to their chief town, became dioceses under the Lower Empire; their status as "mainmorte", having escaped the division of patrimonial domains, explains why they remained almost intact until the end of the Ancien Régime. These divisions were subsequently taken over and partly regrouped to form the generalités, then the départements, but replacing their former ethnic names (e.g. Poitou for the country of Pictons, Auvergne for the country of Arverni, Rouergue for the country of Ruteni, Périgord for country of Pétrocores, etc.) with a physical geographic name (giving respectively the départements of Vienne, Puy-de-Dôme, Aveyron, Dordogne, etc.).

=== Roman provinces ===
The Latin etymology of the term provincia gives us an idea of its original meaning: pro vincere, conquered in advance. Each of Gaul's Roman provinces had a precise legal definition, clearly defined boundaries and codified administrative structures. The number of provinces, their organization and boundaries varied widely over the course of five centuries, and each was headed by a proconsul or propraetor. In addition to Provincia (Provence), which was already Roman, Caesar divided Gaul into three provinces: Aquitanica, Celtica and Belgica. Over the course of four centuries of Roman control, the number of provinces increased from three to eleven, due to both the expansion of the empire and the reduction in size of the original provinces: 1st and 2nd Germania, 1st, 2nd, 3rd and 4th Lugdunensis, 1st and 2nd Aquitanica, 1st and 2nd Belgica, 1st and 2nd Narbonensis, Novempopulanie, Sequanorum, Viennensis, Alpes Cottiarum, Alpes Maritimae, Alpes Graiae et Poeninae. These provinces were subdivided into cities (civitas or civitates in the plural), the number of which rose from 33 to 113.

== Ecclesiastical provinces and dioceses ==
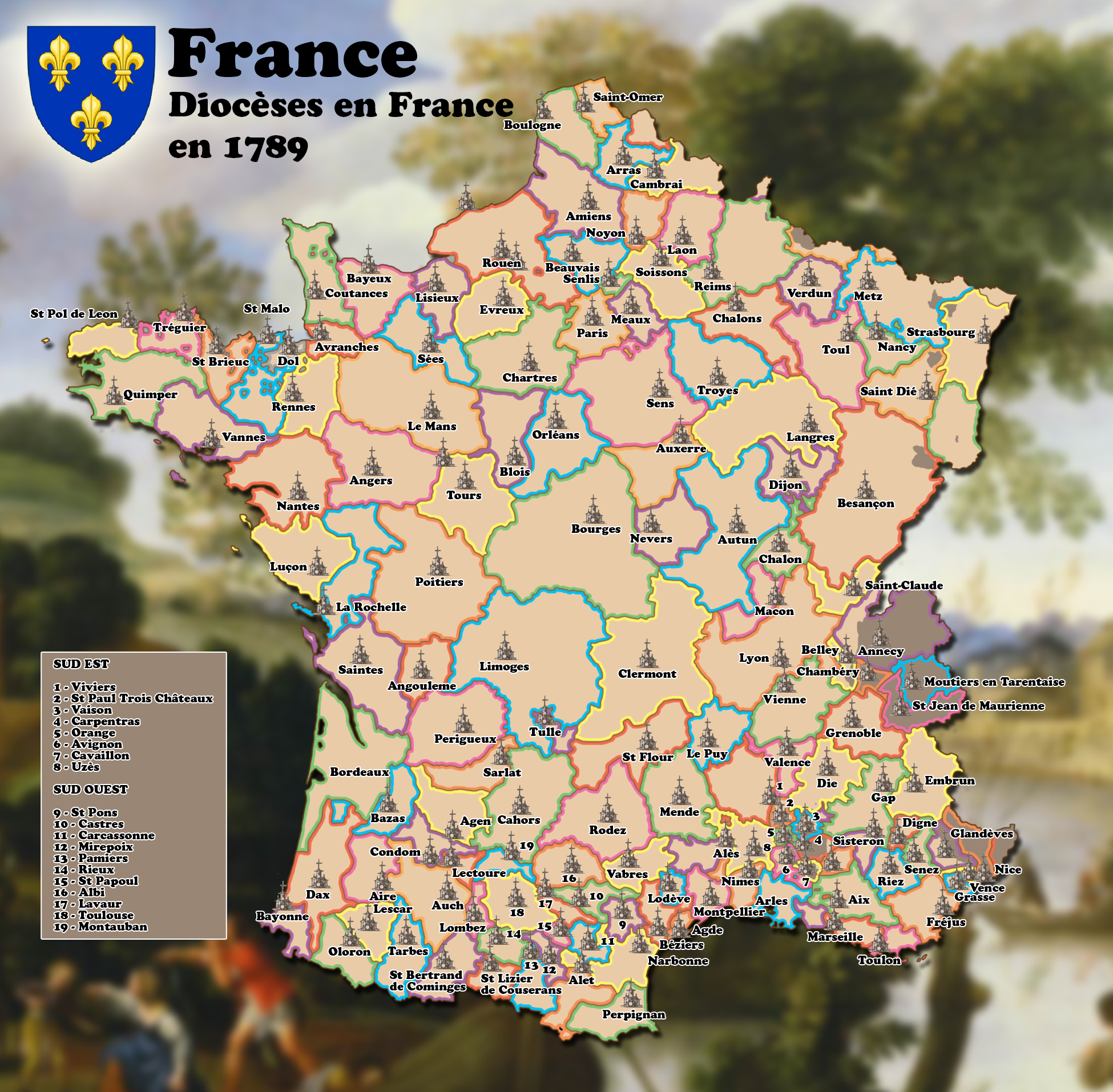
Dioceses in the Kingdom of France in 1789.

Metropolises are territories under the jurisdiction of a metropolitan archbishop, also known as provinces because they originate from the Roman provinces administered by the first bishops after the fall of the Roman Empire.

They are made up of the dioceses which, by the same process, succeeded the ancient civitas or romanized Gallic cities, and which almost always retained the name of an ancient Gallic people, also given to the diocesan capital. Dioceses were made up of parishes, groups of inhabitants who could gather in the same church, whose names and boundaries have been preserved in the 36,000 French communes.

Ecclesiastical districts, by virtue of their mainmortal status, are the oldest and most stable territorial circumscriptions, from late antiquity to the general reorganization of 1802. Today, these 130 or so districts are grouped into the 90 départements and their capital cities, although their ethnonyms have been replaced by names related to physical geography: rivers, mountains, coasts.

== Judicial provinces: parliaments, bailiwicks, and seneschalties ==
Parlements in the Kingdom of France in 1789.

Depending on their laws, customs and languages, the territory of the kingdom is divided into countries of written law (roughly south of a line from La Rochelle to Geneva) and countries of customary law (north of the same line).

Each of these groups includes several parliaments, which are appeal courts whose jurisdictions form as many judicial provinces, and to which belong all the royal jurisdictions, baillages (bailiwicks) and seneschaussées (seneschalties). They are made up of several countries, each corresponding to a general custom, or even a particular custom corresponding to former vici that have retained local customs. For example, the seneschalty of Quercy is made up of five secondary bailiwicks, corresponding to five former vigueries.

== Fiscal provinces: generalities ==
Generalities in the kingdom of France in 1789.

Some authors attempt to equate the concept of province with that of generality. The concepts do occasionally coincide, when the extent of a generality more or less overlaps that of an older territorial entity, but they are not synonymous.

== Military provinces: general governments ==
These are the fiefs that depend directly on the crown (duchies, counties and marches) and owe it military aid.

In addition to the Duchy of France, which became part of the royal domain, the first six major fiefs have the title of peerage:

- The three duchies of Aquitaine or Guyenne, Burgundy and Normandy,
- The three counties of Toulouse, Flanders and Champagne (circa 1212).

Their holders were considered electors of the King of France, along with six other ecclesiastical peers:

- The three bishop-dukes of Reims, Laon and Langres,
- The three bishop-counts of Beauvais, Châlons and Noyon (of Merovingian origin).

The number of grand fiefs varies with history (inheritances, confiscations, conquests, losses, treaties) and increases with the definitive attachment of the County of Provence, the Duchy of Anjou, the Duchy of Burgundy, the Duchy of Brittany, the Duchy of Lorraine, and so on. Some of these provinces were simply the return to the crown of a former fiefdom, such as the Duchy of Burgundy, which had been held by Hugues Capet's brother. Others, such as the Duchy of Savoy, Corsica, Comtat-Vénessin and the County of Nice, were acquired from the Empire or the Holy See.

Unlike the ecclesiastical provinces, their extent varies over the course of history according to the possessions of their holders, or to political reorganizations. For example, the Duchy of Gascony disappeared in the 11th century, and the Duchy of Normandy was divided into two military governments.

In modern times, the "thirty-six governments" corresponded to the provinces on which all the fiefs and arrière-fiefs depended, providing territorial districts for defense and marshaling, the raising of men-at-arms, the construction of squares, arsenals and castles, judges-at-arms, and therefore also all questions of nobility, armorial bearings, etc.

At the end of the Ancien Régime, not counting overseas territories such as the French islands of America, Pondicherry, Mauritius or New France (a province from 1663 to 1763, when it was ceded to Great Britain and Spain), there were thirty-six regions with a governor in charge of defense, called governments. Each had its own nobility.

Together with the regions attached to France since 1791, these thirty-six governments correspond to what are usually known today as the "former provinces of France".

=== List of former general governments of France ===
The list below shows the major provinces of France at the time of their dissolution during the French Revolution. Capital cities are shown in parentheses. Bold indicates a city that was also the seat of a judicial and quasi-legislative body called either a parlement (not to be confused with a parliament) or a conseil souverain (sovereign council). In some cases, this body met in a different city from the capital.

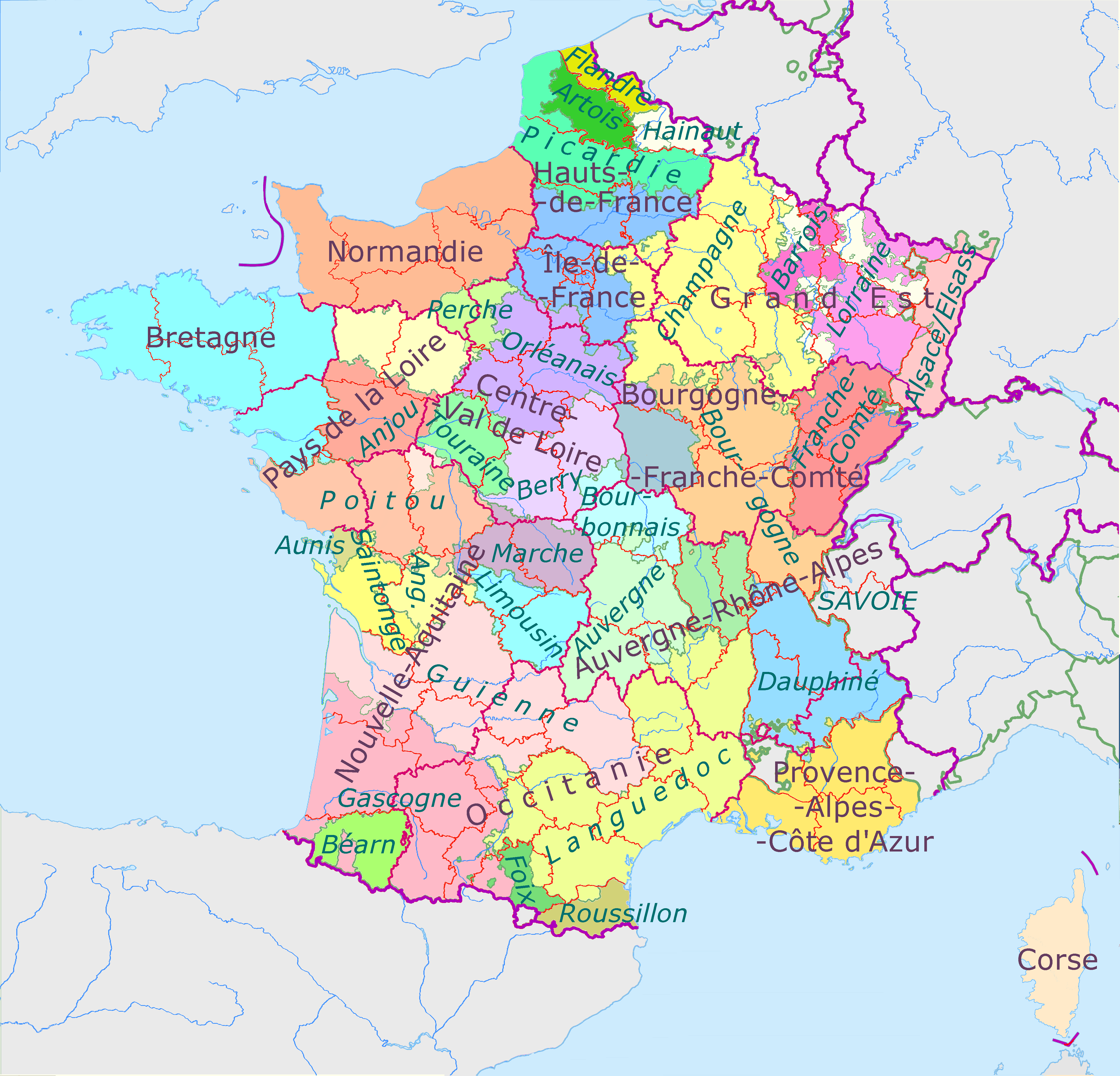
General governments of France in 1789, superimposed by modern administrative boundaries and the names of current regions

Provinces of France in 1789 relative to the modern borders of France Note: The Comtat Venaissin (annexed 1791), Mulhouse (annexed 1798), Montbéliard (annexed 1816), Savoy and Nice (annexed 1860), as well as small portions of other provinces were not part of the Kingdom of France.

1. Île-de-France (**Paris**)
2. Berry (Bourges)
3. Orléanais (Orléans)
4. Normandy (**Rouen**)
5. Languedoc (**Toulouse**)
6. Lyonnais (Lyon)
7. Dauphiné (**Grenoble**)
8. Champagne (Troyes)
9. Aunis (La Rochelle)
10. Saintonge (Saintes)
11. Poitou (Poitiers)
12. Guyenne and Gascony (**Bordeaux**)
13. Burgundy (**Dijon**)
14. Picardy (Amiens)
15. Anjou (Angers)
16. Provence (**Aix-en-Provence**)
17. Angoumois (Angoulême)
18. Bourbonnais (Moulins)
19. Marche (Guéret)
20. Brittany (**Rennes**)
21. Maine and Perche (Le Mans)
22. Touraine (Tours)
23. Limousin (Limoges)
24. Foix (Foix)
25. Auvergne (Clermont-Ferrand)
26. Béarn (**Pau**); Lower Navarre (Saint-Jean-Pied-de-Port)
27. Alsace (Strasbourg, conseils souverains in **Colmar**)
28. Artois (Arras)
29. Roussillon (**Perpignan**)
30. Flanders and Hainaut (Lille, conseils souverains in **Douai**)
31. Franche-Comté (**Besançon**)
32. Lorraine and Barrois (**Nancy**); Trois-Évêchés (Three Bishoprics within Lorraine): **Metz**, Toul and Verdun
33. Corsica (Ajaccio, conseils souverains in **Bastia**)
34. Nivernais (Nevers)

Areas that were not part of the Kingdom of France, though they are currently parts of Metropolitan France:

35. Comtat Venaissin, a Papal fief (Avignon) and Principality of Orange, a feudal state in Provence (Orange)
36. County of Saarwerden (Sarre-Union, formerly Bouquenom)
37. Principality of Salm-Salm (Badonviller, before 1766; Senones from 1766 to 1793)
38. Republic of Mulhouse (Mulhouse)
39. Montbéliard (Montbéliard), a fief of Württemberg
40. Savoy (Chambéry), a Sardinian fief
41. Nice (Nice), a Sardinian fief

== Arms ==
=== Arms of the Provinces of France under the Ancien Regime ===
15. Alsace	15. Anjou	17.Angoumois	28. Artois	25. Auvergne	26.(1) Béarn	2. Berry	18. Bourbonnais	13. Burgundy	20. Brittany	8.Champagne	33. Corse	7. Dauphiné	24. Foix
Alsace	Anjou	Angoumois	Artois	Auvergne	Béarn	Berry	Berry	Burgundy	Brittany	Champagne	Corse	Dauphiné	Foix
31. Franche-Comté	12. Gascony	12. Guyenne	5. Languedoc	23. Limousin	32. Lorraine	21. Maine	19. Marche	26.(2) Navarre, Lower	4. Normandy	16. Provence	18. Roussillon	10. Saintonge	22. Touraine
Franche-Comté	Gascony	Guyenne	Languedoc	Limousin	Lorraine	Maine	Marche	Navarre, Lower	Normandy	Provence	Roussillon	Saintonge	Touraine

=== Arms of the traditional countries of France under the Ancien Regime ===
Alençon	Barrois	Bigorre	Cornouaille	Gévaudan	Labourd	Quercy	Soule	Tregor	Valois	Vannetais	Vivarais
Alençon	Barrois	Bigorre	Cornouaille	Gévaudan	Labourd	Quercy	Soule	Tregor	Valois	Vannetais	Vivarais

=== Arms of areas that were not part of the Kingdom of France, though they are currently parts of Metropolitan France ===
39. Principality of Montbéliard	38. Republic of Mulhouse	41. County of Nice	35.(2) Principality of Orange	37. Principalty of Salm-Salm	36. County of Saarwerden	40. Savoy	35.(1) Comtat Venaissin
Principalty of Montbéliard	Republic of Mulhouse	County of Nice	Principalty of Orange	Principalty of Salm-Salm	County of Saarwerden	Savoy	Comtat Venaissin

== See also ==
- Ancien Régime
- Gallery of French coats of arms
- Coat of arms
- Heraldry
- Royal Almanac
