= Friedrich III von Saarwerden =

Frederick of Saarwerden was Archbishop of Cologne

- Archbishop(-elector) of Cologne
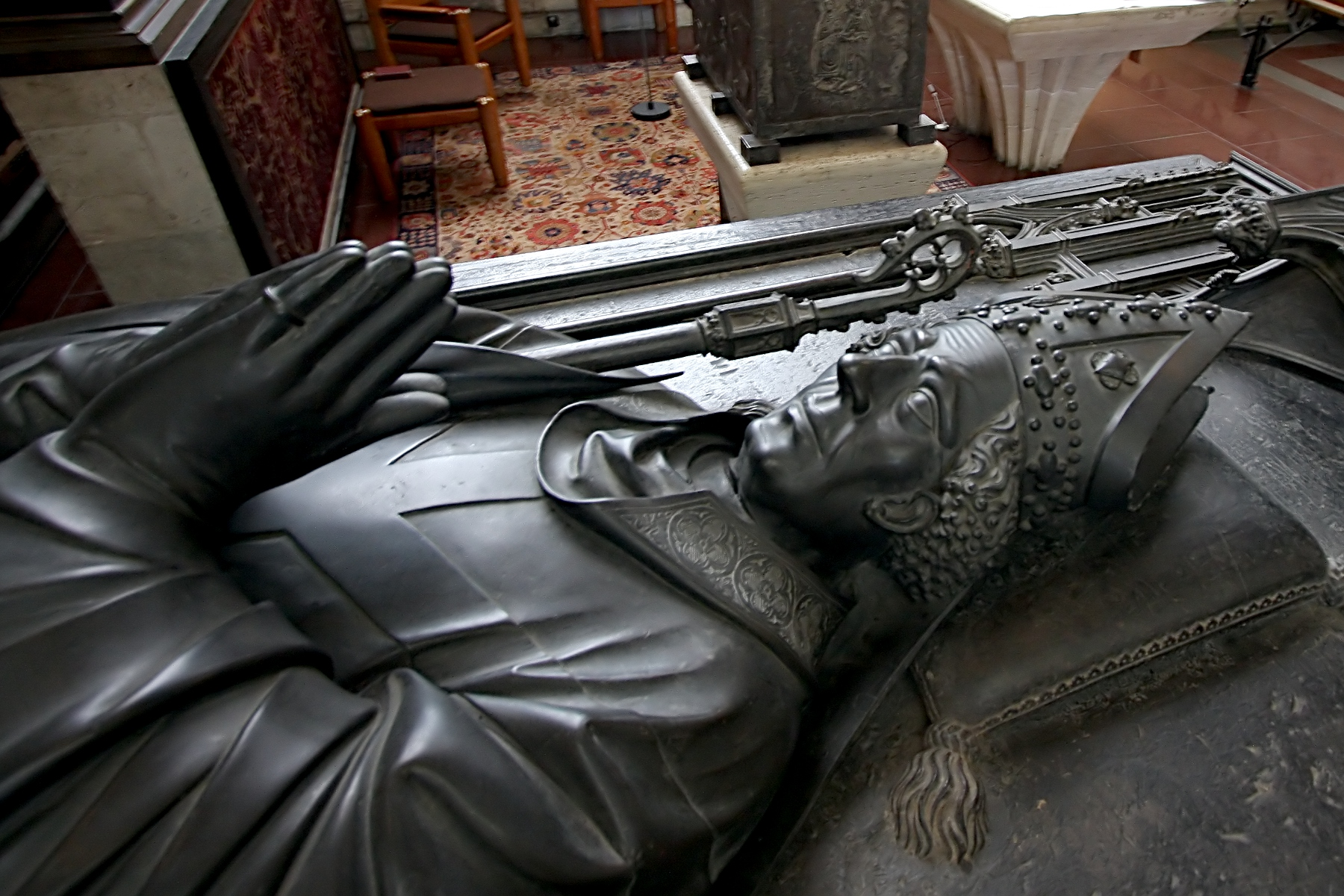
- Tomb effigy on the high tomb of Frederick III von Saarwerden in Cologne Cathedral
- Church: Catholic Church
- Archdiocese: Archdiocese of Cologne
- In office: 13 November 1370 – 9 April 1414
- Predecessor: Engelbert III von der Mark
- Successor: Dietrich II von Moers

Personal details
- Born: 1348 Saarwerden, County of Saarwerden, Holy Roman Empire
- Died: 9 April 1414 (aged 65–66) Poppelsdorf (in present-day Bonn), Electorate of Cologne, Holy Roman Empire

Frederick von Saarwerden (c. 1348 – 9 April 1414) was archbishop-elector of Cologne as Frederick III from 1370 to 1414. Through the promotion of his great-uncle, Archbishop Kuno II of Falkenstein of Trier, Frederick von Saarwerden was elected archbishop of Cologne at the age of 20, which the Pope in Avignon also confirmed two years later after some misgivings. Frederick found the archbishopric completely plundered by his two predecessors of the County of Mark, Adolf and Engelbert, and had himself promised high payments to the Curia on the occasion of his election. Nevertheless, with the help of his very rich great-uncle Kuno, he succeeded in paying off the debts of the archbishopric within a few years. Frederick von Saarwerden supported Emperor Charles IV and was therefore granted privileges by him that supported Frederick's policy of rule. Right at the beginning of his term of office, he successfully suppressed hereditary conflicts among the landed nobility as well as autonomy efforts in the towns of the archdiocese, thus asserting his sovereign supremacy, which was not challenged again until the end of his reign. However, he was unable to take advantage of a conflict within the city of Cologne between the city council and the juryman over high justice to renew the position of power in the city lost by his predecessors. The dispute, which was ultimately also conducted militarily with the participation of neighboring princes, ended with a compromise in 1377.

Frederick was able to expand the territorial holdings of the archdiocese. Even before Frederick took office, Kuno von Falkenstein, as diocesan administrator, had acquired the County of Arnsberg in 1368. Frederick was able to secure this acquisition as well as the gain of the land of Linn on the Lower Rhine in three feuds against the two brothers of the counts Adolf and Engelbert of the Mark. His work as a territorial ruler can hardly be overestimated, even though his initiatives in imperial or ecclesiastical politics were pushed into the background.

When Frederick III von Saarwerden died in 1414, he left a rich and well-ordered archbishopric and lordship to his nephew and successor, Dietrich II of Moers.

== Life and work ==
=== Childhood and youth ===
Coat of arms of the county of Saarwerden

Frederick was born in Saarwerden to Count Johann II of Saarwerden and his wife Klara of Finstingen. The Counts of Saarwerden had their seat in the eponymous town of Sarrewerden on the upper Saar. While his brother Heinrich was destined to succeed him in the county, Frederick was destined at the age of ten for a career as a clerical and secular prince of the church and was therefore placed in the care of his second-degree uncle, the archbishop of Trier, Kuno II of Falkenstein. In 1366, the latter was appointed coadjutor of the archbishop of Cologne, Engelbert III of the Mark, by the Cologne cathedral chapter and now sought to provide his second-degree nephew with a favorable position in Cologne. Thus Kuno obtained for Frederick some lucrative Cologne benefices, namely the provostship in the stift St. Maria ad Gradus as well as a canonry. He did not need to hold these offices personally while still studying canon law at the University of Bologna.

=== Nomination as Archbishop of Cologne ===
On 25 August 1368, Archbishop Engelbert III died. Kuno von Falkenstein initially continued to administer the archbishopric, because the cathedral chapter appointed him already on 28 August as momper or administrator for the time of the sede vacante. Immediately Kuno tried to build up his nephew 2nd degree Frederick as the new archbishop. He also obtained a postulation from the cathedral chapter, although not unanimous, i.e. a proposal for appointment, since the appointment of the archbishop at that time already belonged to the pope. Pope Urban V at the Avignon Papacy, however, rejected this request on 7 November 1368: Frederick was too young - he had not yet reached the canonical age of 30 -, was inexperienced in ecclesiastical matters, and his person and way of life were still completely unknown to the Curia. The Pope's request for the appointment of the Archbishop was rejected. In addition, Emperor Charles IV wanted the ecclesiastical electorates to be filled with suitable candidates for the planned election of his son Wenceslaus IV of Bohemia as King of the Romans and pressed the Pope, who for his part was dependent on imperial support to regain the Papal States. In his letter of refusal to Frederick von Saarwerden, the pope therefore transferred his great uncle Kuno from Trier to Cologne, John of Luxembourg-Ligny, the relative and Protégé of Emperor Charles, from Strasbourg to Trier, and Frederick von Saarwerden to Strasbourg.

Kuno of Falkenstein, however, refused these plans to settle his great-nephew with Strasbourg. According to the Pope's will, the bishopric rotation was supposed to satisfy the claims of all parties involved, but Kuno refused the translation despite imploring pleas from the Curia and also from the Cologne Cathedral Chapter. However, the pope did not appoint Frederick von Saarwerden as the new archbishop of Cologne, nor any other candidate. Why the occupation of the arch see of Cologne did not take place for the time being is not conclusively documented, but much speaks for the thesis that the pope simply wanted to keep the problems between the emperor and Kuno of Falkenstein connected with the occupation in abeyance. For the Curia, this solution was the most elegant: John of Luxembourg-Ligny, who according to other sources was quite incompetent, was left in the not so politically exposed bishopric of Strasbourg, Kuno was bound more closely to the Pope by leaving this second electorate in revocation, and the archbishopric of Cologne retained a capable administrator. Quite incidentally, the Curia was thus able to collect the intercalary fruits - Cologne's income during the Sedis vacancy - in the estimated amount of 20,000 gold florins annually. Pope Urban V therefore appointed Kuno of Falkenstein Vicar Apostolic on 30 July 1369, and Apostolic Administrator on 27 March 1370, for two more years with the prospect of renewal.

In the summer of 1370, Kuno von Falkenstein initiated a second and this time unanimous supplication of the cathedral chapter to the pope for the appointment of Frederick von Saarwerden. Frederick immediately traveled to the papal court and won the pope over, so that he received his appointment on 13 November. Because he is referred to as archbishop in seven documents dated February 1371, Heinrich Volbert Sauerland assumes that he received the ordination as deacon and presbyter as well as the consecration as bishop still in Avignon in the meantime. Thereupon he went back to the Rhine to be enthroned. On 20 June 1371, Frederick confirmed all of Kuno's orders as lawful, whereupon Kuno released all officials from their oaths and duties to him on 2 July 1371. Frederick received the secular regalia on 13 November 1371, through envoys of the king in Bautzen and also in persona probably in May 1372 at the imperial diet. November 1371 by envoys of the king in Bautzen the secular regalia and also in persona probably in May 1372 at the Imperial Diet in Mainz, when he also received the enfeoffment with the Duchy of Westphalia. After his return, the solemn entry into his episcopal city then took place on 21 June 1372, after he had already confirmed all the rights of the city of Cologne on 30 April 1372. The king was the first to be granted the rights of the city of Cologne.

The main reason why the Pope granted the archbishopric to Frederick von Saarwerden after all was the young archbishop's extensive financial obligations. The archbishopric of Cologne was already the richest archbishopric in Germany at that time - the curia estimated the annual income at 30,000 gold florins. During Kuno's administration, the Curia was able to reserve 20,000 gold florins of this for itself. Contrary to the custom of paying only once an "appointment fee" of one third of the annual income, i.e. 10,000 gold florins, Frederick undertook to pay a total of 120,000 gold florins in six annual installments. The archbishopric had been completely plundered during the short period of Frederick's two predecessors, Adolf of the Marck and Engelbert III, so that payments to the curia seemed almost impossible. The Curia therefore also had the usual sanction mechanism confirmed - failure to pay threatened first excommunication and then interdict as a reinforced form.

=== Desolate state of the archbishopric when Frederick took office ===
The Archbishopric of Cologne was heavily in debt at the beginning of Frederick von Saarwerden's reign. It is reported that when Frederick took office, he was given a letter in which the debts were quantified at more than 474,000 florins. Even if this high sum is not documented, the report about it gives a tendency. For firstly, there were no more cash funds available and secondly, important sources of income had been alienated from the archbishopric.

After the death of Wilhelm von Gennep in 1362, there was a dispute about the archbishopric, because the bishop of Liège, Engelbert of the Mark, his nephew, the Münster-elect, Adolf of the Marck, and the canon of the cathedral, Johann von Virneburg, repeatedly applied for the bishop's chair. While the first two candidates sought confirmation from the Pope in Avignon, Johann was able to win over the majority of the cathedral chapter in a turbulent election - a minority pleaded for Florenz von Wevelinghoven. He immediately occupied the cities of Andernach and Linz with other family members and took all the cash of the deceased archbishop. Adolf could only take over the archbishopric by conceding this robbery to Johann on 23 October 1363.

Adolf himself continued to incur debts, before he "bequeathed" the archbishopric to his uncle Engelbert on 15 April 1364, the very next year, in order to become Count of Cleves. For this translation, not only did further funds from the archbishopric's treasury flow to Avignon, but the new archbishop Engelbert also pledged all of the Electorate of Cologne's territories and revenue sources north of Neuss to his nephew - the Kempen and Oedt offices as well as the customs and Rheinberg office. The Rhine customs of Rheinberg was the most profitable customs of the archbishop's four Rhine customs and, with about 10,000 gold guilders in revenue - after deduction of annuities - about 60% of the cash income of the archbishopric. In addition, Engelbert made his nephew of the same name Marshall of Westphalia and gave him in pledge the office of Waldenburg-Schnellenberg, which actually furthered a competitor for the rule in Westphalia.

In order to limit this sell-out of the archbishopric to Adolf of the Marck, the cathedral chapter had forced Archbishop Engelbert to appoint the coadjutor Kuno von Falkenstein, whereby Engelbert received the offices and castles of Brühl and Lechenich with all revenues - approx. 2,000 gold florins annually - as his retirement residence. Kuno took over Cologne debts, but demanded and received securities for them. In his deed of appointment, Kuno was granted the castles and offices of Altenwied, Linz with the Rhine customs, Rolandseck, Ahrweiler, Andernach, Schönstein, Nürburg, Thurant Castle, and Zeltingen at Christmas 1366.

Thus, in the summer of 1372, Frederick von Saarwerden found an archbishopric that was half owned by his great-uncle or Adolf of the Marck. In addition, most of the revenues were in the hands of the two. As if this situation were not already hopeless enough, the archbishop was heavily in debt to various creditors, but especially to the curia. A change in the circumstances by his own efforts therefore seemed almost impossible. All of the young archbishop's efforts were therefore concentrated on financial policy for the time being.

=== Financial policy ===
The beneficiaries of the turmoil of the years 1362–1372 to the disadvantage of the archdiocese of Cologne were Adolf of the Marck, Kuno von Falkenstein and the pope in Avignon. The first two also held extensive territories and lucrative Rhine customs as pledges. However, there was a difference between the pledged property of Count Adolf and that of Archbishop Kuno: While Adolf was the full beneficiary of the offices until they were paid out (so-called perpetuity statute), Kuno's revenues were offset against the debts due to the church's prohibition of interest (so-called death statute). Thus, while Adolf's pledged property reduced the territory and revenues of Kurköln even in the long term, Kuno's pledged property would sooner or later revert to the archbishopric. Therefore, Frederick's top priority was to get back Adolf's pledge and only then to pay Kuno. The debt to the Curia was initially of no importance to Frederick due to the payment modalities, and its redemption was therefore taken up last.

==== The reclamation of customs and the Rheinberg office ====
Soon after taking office, Archbishop Frederick entered into negotiations with Adolf of the Marck about the return of the office and Rhine toll of Rheinberg. He was helped in this by the fact that Adolf could not take over the county of Cleves unchallenged after the death of the last count from the House of Flamenses Johann von Kleve in 1368, despite the extensive preparations since his resignation as elector of Cologne in 1366. Adolf had had to recruit mercenaries and assert his claim militarily, but was only the undisputed new count after he had paid off his rival Dietrich von Horn with 37,000 scudo. In addition, he had been involved in the incipient First War of the Guelderian Succession since 1371, where he supported the pretender Mechthild and acquired the city of Emmerich from her for 38,000 scudo. Finally, the dowry of 20,000 gold shields from his wife Margarethe of Berg failed to materialize.

In the summer of 1372, the negotiations entered the final phase and on 3 October 1372, a transfer agreement was signed. Adolf of the Marck handed over the customs and the office of Rheinberg for a high price, knowing full well how important Rheinberg was for Archbishop Frederick in terms of finance, territory and domestic policy. The redemption sum was set at 55,000 gold shields and further annual payments of 2,000 gold shields were agreed upon, with the handover taking place at Christmas 1372 after payment, or assumption of debts, of 26,000 gold shields. On 16 May 1373, Adolf of the Marck acknowledged receipt of all the money, making Frederick once again sole lord of Rheinberg. The Kempen and Oedt offices had already returned to the possession of the archbishopric under the administration of Kuno von Falkenstein on 21 March 1369.

Most of the expenses for the ransom were not paid in cash, but were met by taking over Adolf's debt titles - evidence of the strained financial situation, which was now becoming even more difficult. How thin the archbishopric's financial ceiling was between 1373 and 1376 is evident from the fact that the archbishopric's rentmaster was still short 10,000 florene and 16,000 marks at the annual accounting on 31 May 1374, although the Cologne clergy had granted the archbishop a subsidium caritativum over eight tithes at the beginning of 1374. There is even a receipt from 1372 for a partial payment of Frederick's pontificals; he had thus had to pledge his insignia of office. Frederick was in debt not only to Kuno, but also to some Lombards and Cologne Jews. In April 1374, he even borrowed 5,000 florins in Lübeck, which were not repaid until 1381. Because of his financial situation, however, Frederick was at least able to obtain an increase in his customs duties in Neuss and Bonn or Linz from the emperor.

==== Debt relief with Archbishop Kuno of Falkenstein ====
The rich archbishop of Trier was a kind of family bank for Frederick, where he could ask for interest-free loans, which were granted to him every time out of family solidarity. Nevertheless, the temporary loss of all the offices south of Godesberg diminished Frederick's political ability to act as sovereign, which is why an early redemption was sought here as well. First, however, Frederick had to use Kuno's money to serve his other creditors, which is why Kuno's debts kept piling up. Already at the final settlement as administrator, Kuno had taken over liabilities amounting to 73,607.5 florene. In addition, Frederick borrowed another 52,000 florins when he took office on 1 July 1371, and transferred half of the productive Bonn Rhine customs to Kuno in return. Frederick had to borrow another 20,000 florins on 1 July 1374 - after the financial injection of the Cologne clergy - and in return also transferred to Kuno the second half of the Bonn customs as well as the customs of Rheinberg and Zons, with which all Cologne Rhine customs were in the hands of Frederick's second-degree uncle. However, this step was not considered out of sheer necessity, but in order to achieve an early redemption - after all, Kuno could count on more than 40,000 gold florins annually from the Rhine customs duties.

However, Frederick was able to completely pay off Kuno's debts only by receiving money from Emperor Charles IV for the election of his son Wenceslaus IV of Bohemia as Roman King in 1376. Although no receipt of the 30,000 florins and 6,000 shocks of Prague groschen pledged for Wenceslaus' election as king has survived, the chronicles indicate the receipt of between 40 and 50,000 florins. The money was used to pay for the election of his son Wenceslas of Bohemia. This sum coincides with a receipt from Kuno of Falkenstein for 49,034 florins in cash dated 28 June 1376. Presumably, the money passed into Kuno's hands immediately after receipt in Rhens, so that there is no invoice for it in Cologne, only the receipt. Thus the archbishopric was free of debt to Kuno von Falkenstein. From then on, Frederick could devote himself to debt relief with the Curia.

==== Debt relief at the Curia ====
Frederick had promised the Curia the gigantic sum of 120,000 florins for his appointment as archbishop. However, it did not come to a disbursement; only a few hundred florins servitude fee were received in Avignon. At first he met with understanding from the Curia in view of the desolate financial situation of the archbishopric. After more than three years, however, the papal chamber lost patience and put the sanction mechanism into effect: on 5 September 1375, Frederick was excommunicated for defaulting on five installments. This was followed on 24 October 1375, by a papal summons to the Council of the City of Cologne to make public the process initiated against Frederick. Pope Gregory XI released the city from all obligations to Frederick.

However, the excommunication hardly showed any consequences in the archdiocese. The clergy had complained earlier about the transfer of funds to Avignon and, especially after 1370, categorically refused payments at a synod. Therefore, Frederick could count on the support of the clergy. Nevertheless, he did not want to break off contact with the Curia. On 1 June 1376, he offered the papal nuncio the prospect of 30,000 florins from the emperor, which the latter had promised Frederick in the fall of 1374. Finally, in February 1377, Gregory XI offered Frederick a contract to waive further claims upon immediate payment of 30,000 florins and to lift the excommunication altogether.

But again, Frederick paid nothing. Rather, the situation changed in Frederick's favor with the advent of the Western Schism. On 27 February 1379, Frederick, together with King Wenceslaus and the Rhenish electors, confessed to Pope Urban VI in Rome, who had been quarreling with the antipope Clement VII in Avignon since September 1378. Pope Urban VI then forgave the debt of 120,000 florins and 11,000 florins of servitia to his supporter Frederick and absolved him from anathema.

With the help of his relative Kuno as an inexhaustible source of - interest-free - loans, Frederick succeeded within half a decade in paying off the debts of his archdiocese and in the process recovering estates that were still alienated. One of the main reasons for this was the yield of the Rhine customs duties, which flushed enormous sums of cash into the coffers of the Rentmeister. After this debt relief, Frederick was able to start carrying out security measures that had been left undone until then. He had the castles of Kempen, Liedberg, Hülchrath, Linn, Zons and Zülpich built and the fortifications of Xanten expanded. In addition, he acquired works of art for himself and the Cologne church. At his death he is said to have left 300,000 florins, which is probably exaggerated. However, his wealth was known and admired by his contemporaries. In 1449, John of Cleve retrospectively called him: "superhabundans et in redditibus adeo locuplex existens" - a man who was "exceedingly wealthy and richly endowed with means".

=== Territorial policy ===
On the one hand, Frederick von Saarwerden was concerned with the internal expansion of his territory; on the other hand, he took advantage of opportunities that arose to enlarge the territory of the archdiocese. Both in the Rhineland and in Westphalia, the count brothers Adolf and Engelbert of the Mark were his main adversaries, although this did not exclude occasional cooperation against third parties. Frederick benefited from the fact that the dukes of Jülich had been claimed by inheritance disputes over the Duchy of Guelders in the 1370s and subsequently oriented themselves against the Duchy of Brabant. In addition, the relationship with the other branch of the House of Jülich, the counts and, since 1380, dukes of Berg, was not particularly close, so that despite individual areas of tension between Jülich and Electorate Cologne, no overarching alliance was formed against the archdiocese of Cologne.

==== Interior land development ====
Under Frederick of Saarwerden, the internal development of the territory progressed within both local and central administration—though a distinction must be made here between ecclesiastical and administrative management on the one hand, and political leadership on the other:

The ecclesiastical administration was already fully developed by 1320. After a judicial vicar was initially appointed in the 13th century as an official for spiritual affairs, by 1320 an authority of 40 persons, including more than 20 notaries, had developed with its own organizational statute and bylaws to regulate routine business. This separation between the spiritual affairs of the archbishopric and the secular affairs of the archdiocese was further reinforced by the introduction of the vicar general (see below).

Under Archbishop Frederick, the administration of the offices was completed in such a way that, in addition to the bailiff, the bailiff's steward was employed across the board. In doing so, he took up essential innovations of his predecessor Walram of Jülich from the 1340s, namely the territorial fixation of the offices, the introduction of the rentmaster as the central financial official and the establishment of the council as the political governing body of the archdiocese. Thus, after the central administration, a separation between the fiscal and military administration was now also introduced at the office level.

The central administration continued to develop under Frederick. Like most other sovereigns, he continued to exercise an itinerant court, but he established a permanent chancery with archives in Poppelsdorf. His stays were concentrated in the area of Brühl, Bonn and Godesberg, so that in addition to his traveling household of about 60-100 persons, another 40 persons in the castles there are to be counted among the archbishop's household. Three administrative secretaries accompanied him constantly and two were responsible for the archbishop's records in Poppelsdorf - the writing down increased to a great extent, so that more registers are available from his reign than from all his predecessors together. Nevertheless, this duplication could not exist in the long term, and so the itinerant court was abandoned in favor of a locally bound central administration, first in Brühl, then finally in Bonn in the 16th century. The volume of correspondence also increased enormously. Frederick took over a feudal register from his predecessor Adolf and had a register of all feudatories arranged according to offices, which was constantly updated. The first chancery notes have survived from Frederick's tenure, as well as the creation of a register ("the collection and book-like compilation of copies of all or selected documents produced in the chancery"). The main focus of registration was clearly on the development of estates and lands, which is reflected by the high number of receipts. Therefore, the registration of deeds was more random than planned; service orders were generally not registered. It was not until Frederick's successors that records and registries were kept in accordance with modern administration. Nevertheless, there are more documents from Archbishop Frederick's tenure than from all of his predecessors combined.

The political institutions of the archdiocese developed least under Frederick von Saarwerden - which can certainly be considered a success of the archbishop. For dynastic crises, lost wars or mismanagement of the sovereigns were regularly the reason for the development of a provincial constitution. Knights, clergy and towns joined forces to protect the territory and took over the debts of their lords in exchange for assurances of privileges. In all the larger territories of the north-west region - with the exception of Electorate of Cologne - land constitutions had therefore come into being by 1350 with the union of the estates. Since Frederick von Saarwerden succeeded in mastering the debt crisis of his archdiocese, he was not dependent on the help of the estates. Because his "government program" essentially corresponded to the capitulations of the cathedral chapter when Cuno of Falkenstein was appointed, there were no conflicts with this body - unlike his successors, Frederick did not have to invoke electoral capitulations. By including ministerials and members of the cathedral chapter in his council, he was rather able to commit both estates to his governance. Therefore, nothing is heard of conflicts between Archbishop Frederick and the cathedral chapter - it was more a partner in the government than a landed class opposition. This was only to change under the ruinous policies of Frederick's successors, leading to the Landständische Vereinigung in 1462, which lasted as the constitution of the Electoral State until the end of the Ancien Régime.

Frederick von Saarwerden was much more agile in his politics because he could act more independently financially than his territorial neighbors, which contributed significantly to his successful territorial policy.

==== Territorial gains in the Upper and Lower Abbey ====
Already at the beginning of his reign, Frederick was able to take advantage of inheritance disputes in smaller dominions in the south and north of the archdiocese and make direct conquests as well as bring the formerly free dominions under Cologne fiefdom.

In 1372 Frederick interfered in the affairs of the County of Neuenahr. The background to this was the hitherto unsuccessful succession of the lords of Saffenberg following the extinction of the old count's house in 1360. Johann von Saffenberg had married Katharina von Neuenahr, the only daughter of the deceased count, and was now confronted with the competing claims of the lords of Isenburg and Roesberg, distant relatives of Katharina. The county of Neuenahr was half a fief of the Archbishop of Cologne and half a fief of the Duke of Jülich. Both Frederick and Duke Wilhelm had confirmed Johann von Saffenberg as the new count, but he was unable to hold his own in the feud that broke out and lost the castles of Neuenahr and Merzenich as well as two-thirds of the county by mid-1372. Archbishop Frederick now intervened in the feud to support Johann von Saffenberg. Between May and September 1372, Neuenahr and Merzenich were conquered. Frederick destroyed the latter castle and also incorporated the dominion of Rösberg into the archbishopric for the time being. Johann von Saffenberg bought his claim to the county of Neuenahr dearly: The archbishop not only retained the conquered positions in Merzenich, he also forced the new count to declare his ancestral seat an Öffnungsrecht and to cede the Burgberg of Neuenahr to the archbishop. Both directly and indirectly, the archbishop was the clear winner from the Neuenahr feud. The Duke of Jülich, as the other feudal lord, had been completely tied up in the First War of the Guelderian Succession against Mechthild of Cleves since 1371 as regent for his minor son, and thus had to leave the field to Archbishop Frederick. The lordship of Roesberg was not restored until 1393, but this time as a fief of Kurköln.

After William of Jülich had prevailed in Geldern in 1377, he demanded compensation from Archbishop Frederick for his unilateral action in Neuenahr. Connected with this was the unsatisfactorily resolved question between the Electorate of Cologne and Jülich of the dominion in Zülpich. Frederick reached a compromise on 28 May 1379, in which the villages of Merzenich and Girbelsrath were granted to Jülich for four years along with 6,000 gold shields, for which, however, Frederick was allowed to administer Zülpich alone - a favorable outcome for the archbishopric. Frederick therefore sought to preserve this agreement in perpetuity, firstly by only slightly amended treaties in 1388 and 1393, and secondly by renewing the city's fortifications and building a defensible castle. Although Frederick had to share the city in almost all rights with the Duke of Jülich-Geldern on 3 July 1397, this provision was only valid for the lifetime of the contracting parties, and so after the early death of William I of Guelders and Jülich in 1402, Frederick's bailiff sent his Jülich colleague out the door. Although the archbishop succeeded in wresting the bailiwick over Zülpich from the duke of Jülich, an extension of the Schöffengergerichtsbarkeit to the surrounding villages could not be enforced. In 1409, both sides consolidated the previous position that Merzenich and Girbelsrath should remain with Jülich, Zülpich and four upstream villages with Cologne, for which the archbishop paid 7,000 guilders. It then remained at this level.

Frederick von Saarwerden was also able to make small gains in the north of his archdiocese by bringing the free dominion of Helpenstein under his feudal rule. In the fall of 1373, Frederick began a feud with Gumprecht of Alpen, which had been announced in 1371. Gumprecht wanted to occupy the dominion by force after the extinction of the last lords of Helpenstein (with possession over Helpenstein, Grimlinghausen and Hoisten near Neuss). Half of the dominion was owned by the lords of Blankenheim, who had pledged their share to Gumprecht. In addition to owning one half, Gumprecht now wanted to force ownership of the other half by capturing Johann von Lennep - the next claimant to the dominion through his wife - and by rebuilding an already demolished castle in Helpenstein. The archbishop quickly seized the entire dominion and destroyed the castle. In an atonement treaty, Gumprecht von Alpen ceded all rights to the archbishop in 1378, who handed over his half to Blankenheim but retained the other. In 1387, an agreement was reached with Johann von Lennep that he should receive half of the dominion as a fief. Thus, half of Helpenstein and Grimlinghausen passed to the archbishopric. With this, Archbishop Frederick also cashed the rights of the Counts of the Mark to Helpenstein, which were last mentioned in 1369 and which had still owned half of Helpenstein at the beginning of the 14th century and had appointed bailiffs there. The Archbishop of Lennep was the first to give Helpenstein to the archbishopric.

==== Suppression of the autonomy efforts of the city of Neuss ====
In the turmoil surrounding the occupation of the archdiocese of Cologne in 1362/63, the cities of the archdiocese had allied and risen up against the paternalism. Frederick von Saarwerden now wanted to eliminate the late consequences of the urban unification. He chose the city of Neuss to set an example, because in this city the desire for autonomy away from sovereign paternalism was particularly pronounced. In the cities of Brühl and Bonn with the Godesburg, on the other hand, resistance to the sovereign was low, because the archbishop not only preferred to stay there, but also promoted his residences (Brühl castle construction). And the cities of Linz and Andernach in the south were still pledged to Kuno von Falkenstein at the beginning of the 1370s, who ensured order there - sometimes by force - in his sense. Neuss, on the other hand, was the largest city in the Electoral State and the only one in the Lower Abbey.

The archbishop carefully planned the actions against Neuss and staggered them. First, the Rhine duty was transferred from Neuss to Zons in August 1372, whereby the duty exemption of the citizens of Neuss ceased and passed to those of Zons - given the importance of Neuss as a trading center, a sensitive financial loss of many citizens in favor of the archbishop. The reason for this was the gradual shift of the Rhine away from Neuss towards the east - today the Rhine passes about 5 km east of the city center. However, Neuss was still connected to the Rhine via the Erft and so the skippers had to go up to Neuss to pay customs. The people of Neuss now began to force the skippers to unload their goods as well, so that they would be offered for sale in Neuss. However, only Cologne was entitled to this staple right on the Lower Rhine.

With a stroke of his pen, the archbishop moved the customs station to Zons, which was located somewhat further south, so that shipping on the Rhine would not be hindered any further. To this end, he elevated the village of Zons to the status of a town on 20 December 1373. To protect the new customs station in Zons, he had Friedestrom Castle built. In May 1373, Frederick wrote a document in which he complained about the insubordination of the town, the obstruction of Rhine navigation and the archbishop's justice and finally quantified the damage caused to him at more than 100,000 florins - the town, of course, rejected all accusations. A court of arbitration was called, staffed by members of the cathedral chapter and Kuno von Falkenstein. However, it did not come to a mutually satisfactory result. Both parties did not come to an agreement until 1377, whereby the Archbishop of Cologne was in principle proven right and the city of Neuss had to pay a certain amount of compensation, but in return received customs exemption again for the customs in Zons. After 1377, there was no more tension between the archbishop and the city of Neuss, because the patricians in Neuss needed the archbishop's backing against an increasingly rebellious population.

==== Schöffenkrieg and settlement with the city of Cologne ====
From 1374 to 1377, the Schöffenkrieg shook the power structure within the city of Cologne. Archbishop Frederick von Saarwerden had helped to provoke this dispute, whereby the driving forces were to be sought within the city. The starting point was the dispute over the competences of the Schöffen of Cologne. They were responsible for the high jurisdiction of the city and were the only remnant of sovereign power in Cologne, because the aldermen were selected solely by the archbishop from the Cologne patriciate. In the Schöffenkrieg, the archbishop laid claim to a Schöffenweistum, which reserved for him all lordship and power, high jurisdiction, any commandments and prohibitions, as well as customs and coinage. The emperor vouchsafed him these privileges. In addition, he placed Cologne under imperial guard and revoked all privileges for the city, probably to be sure of Frederick's vote in the upcoming election of his son Wenceslaus as King. In return, Cologne ensured that Frederick, a defaulter, was excommunicated in Avignon and that the city was released from its allegiance. Warlike conflicts devastated the surrounding countryside, especially the city of Deutz. Eventually, both sides came to the realization that if the dispute over principles continued, the economic disadvantages for both sides would be greater. An atonement treaty confirmed the status quo ante, in which Cologne also regained all privileges. Frederick came to the realization that his influence within the city was low - the city clergy had sided with the citizens during the dispute and had not followed Frederick's request to leave the city.

An expansion of the right-Rhine exclave Deutz in the Berg duchy was thwarted on 29 March 1393, when the burghers of Cologne captured the Deutz abbey. This, however, called the duke of Berg into action as church bailiff, and the Cologners sanded down the Electorate of Cologne's fortifications around the abbey and did not vacate their positions again until 1396, thus restoring the situation of 1377. On the other hand, the Cologners cooperated very well with Archbishop Frederick when it came to the elimination of new Rhine customs - for example, in 1380 against a Berg customs in Düsseldorf - and the monetary unit on the Rhine - both concluded a cartel with the other Rhenish electors and the Duke of Jülich in 1386 to stabilize the Rhenish guilder.

Overall, the relationship between the archbishop and his cathedral city had been characterized by pragmatism since 1377. According to Wilhelm Janssen: "Because it was the enforcement or at least the recognition of his heerlicheit that mattered to the archbishop in his relationship with Cologne, he accepted an event that was drastic for the constitution of the city, such as the overthrow of the dynastic rule in 1396, without any recognizable reaction. In return for a "worship" of 8,000 florins, he recognized the inner-city reorganization without objection."

==== Disputes with the count brothers Adolf and Engelbert of the Mark ====
The main adversary of Archbishop Frederick von Saarwerden was Count Engelbert III of the Mark, head of the family after the death of Archbishop Engelbert of Cologne in 1368. With Engelbert's support, his brother Adolf had become Count of Cleves in the same year, receiving all the territories on the right bank of the Rhine (Wesel and Duisburg) in return for his support. A third brother, Dietrich von der Mark, was compensated with the city of Dinslaken. In order to enrich himself in Rhine trade, Engelbert took over a Rhine customs duty in Ruhrort from Count Frederick of Moers, which Frederick von Saarwerden unsuccessfully tried to abolish in 1373.

However, the main reason for the disputes between Archbishop Frederick and Count Engelbert lay in Westphalia. For when Kuno von Falkenstein was administrator, he was able to acquire the County of Arnsberg from the last Count Gottfried IV of Arnsberg, bypassing Engelbert of the Mark as the closest relative. Frederick had himself enfeoffed with the county by Charles IV in 1371 to secure the acquisition. He also actively claimed his rights as Duke of Westphalia. In 1372, for example, he was the first, together with the bishops of Münster, Paderborn and Osnabrück and Count Engelbert, to take the oath of allegiance to the Landfrieden issued by the emperor. In addition, Frederick, as Duke of Westphalia, claimed protection of escort rights and, as archbishop, ecclesiastical jurisdiction in the County of Mark, which Engelbert wanted to evade. These natural antagonisms were exacerbated by the fact that with the change of Archbishop Engelbert in 1366/68 to Kuno von Falkenstein and Frederick von Saarwerden, Engelbert was deprived of offices in Westphalia.

==== Disputes with Engelbert of der Mark in Westphalia ====
As late as 1366, Engelbert had reduced Arnsberg to rubble in a feud and eliminated Count Gottfried as an independent power in Westphalia. Engelbert was able to do this undisturbed insofar as his uncle as Archbishop of Cologne not only let him have his way freely, but also gave him the office of Waldenburg-Schnellenberg around Attendorn to the southwest of Arnsberg and elevated him to Marshal of Westphalia, which made Count Engelbert the Archbishop's deputy in the Duchy of Westphalia and lord over further offices east of Arnsberg. In the peace treaty of 22 July 1367, Gottfried IV. ceded land and Fredeburg Castle in the south of Arnsberg to Count Engelbert. Engelbert had prepared the acquisition by buying up older feudal rights to Fredeburg and was now able to enforce them with the military and legal means of the Marshal of Westphalia.

Engelbert of the Mark had thus achieved his territorial political goals in the southern Sauerland, but unexpectedly a situation arose that made the acquisition of the entire county of Arnsberg possible. The closest relatives of the childless Count Gottfried of Arnsberg were the Counts of Oldenburg via an aunt of Gottfried. Thus, Gottfried IV had his subjects pay homage to the Count of Oldenburg in 1364 to ensure the smooth transfer of his county to Oldenburg after his foreseeable death. However, the designated heir, Christian of Oldenburg, fell in 1368 along with his father Moritz in battle against the Frisians. The Count of the Mark, through Gottfried's wife Anna of Cleves, was now the closest relative and thus the probable heir to the county of Arnsberg.

In order not to allow his arch-enemy to achieve this success as well, Gottfried IV sold his county to the Archbishops of Cologne. Kuno von Falkenstein managed this sale quietly and secretly on the day of Archbishop Engelbert's death. On 19 November of the same year, Count John of Cleves died and Count Engelbert went into the field to the Lower Rhine to put his brother in possession of the county, while meanwhile, barely noticed, the Administrator of Cologne overturned the power structure in Westphalia. The handing over of the county of Arnsberg was then planned for a long time, but nevertheless surprisingly took place on 18 and 22 June 1369, combined with the withdrawal of the marshal's office on 24 June 1369, which Kuno had of all things still awarded to Count Gottfried IV. Mockingly, the administrator records in the appointment document of the former Count of Arnsberg that he had withdrawn the marshal's office from Engelbert of the Mark because "vnse lieue vrund Engelbert Greue van der Marke mit viel kriegen vnd vrleugen beladen ist, vnd he sie darvmb nyt alsomal beschirmen mögen als he dede vnd as is dem Gestichte vnd sinen armen luden wal noyt were."

The office of Waldenburg-Schnellenberg was also subsequently taken away from Engelbert of the Mark. Before 2 July 1371, the administrator Kuno von Falkenstein gave the office to the Bishop of Paderborn, but he could not or would not prevail against Engelbert, so Frederick placed this task in the hands of his bailiff of Recklinghausen, Heidenreich of Oer, on 9 July 1373. Before the end of 1373, the office was firmly back in Cologne hands, and the new bailiff was charged with reversing property transfers that had taken place during the eight years of Mark rule.

Engelbert then tried to seize archdiocesan properties and rights in the county of Mark. He tried to get the court of Bochum, which was shared between him and Archbishop Frederick, as well as the estates of Schwelm and Hagen, which he was able to lease indirectly in 1375. He also let himself be hired as a warlord of Cologne in the Schöffenkrieg for no less than 5,000 florins to fight against Frederick. Engelbert was the only one who was able to get a hold of the property of the Electorate of Cologne.

Before 4 January 1380, Engelbert of the Mark also officially opened a feud with Archbishop Frederick, in which he was supported by his brothers and his brother-in-law John of Nassau. Officially, Johann asserted inheritance claims to the county of Arnsberg; in fact, he wanted to oust the archbishop from the city of Siegen, which Johann had ruled jointly with Frederick von Saarwerden until then. On 14 February 1381, a treaty of atonement was signed, giving John of Nassau the city of Siegen and Engelbert of the Mark Bochum, Hagen and Schwelm. On the other hand, Frederick was able to assert his ducal rights of escort in Westphalia and to reject Engelbert's financial claims arising from his activities as Marshal of Westphalia. The feud broke out again the very next year, although this time the saturated Count of Nassau did not intervene in favor of the Margraves. An atonement was not made until 7 November 1384, essentially confirming the status quo ante. A certain relaxation arose in the following years, especially with Engelbert of the Mark, because in 1388/89 Frederick, together with the Count von der Mark, moved against the city of Dortmund, which had repeatedly been awarded to the Archbishop of Cologne in electoral capitulations of the Roman emperors and kings, most recently by Wenceslaus, but was able to maintain its independence as an imperial city. The Dortmund feud, however, did not lead to the conquest of the city; it was able to buy its freedom the next year.

==== The acquisition of Linn and the dispute with Count Adolf on the Lower Rhine ====
In 1388 at the latest, Archbishop Frederick came into possession of the land of Linn, which had previously been undisputed territory of the Counts of Cleves. This led to a major feud between Adolf of the Marck and Frederick von Saarwerden in 1391 and 1392.

The land of Linn was a special case within the county of Cleves, as it was spatially separated from the more northern areas and had been the widow's residence of the countesses of Cleves from time immemorial. Thus Mechthild of Cleves had also come into possession of the lordship in 1368 after the death of her husband. Even when she remarried and laid claim to the Duchy of Guelders against her younger sister (First War of the Guelderian Succession), she remained mistress of Linn Castle. However, she became indebted to her bailiff in Linn, Heinrich von Strüneke, because of the warfare in Guelders, and mortgaged the land to him for 6,000 florins on 6 March 1378, and for another 54,000 florins on 21 February 1380.

In her financial predicament, she immediately pledged Linn again to Frederick von Saarwerden for 45,000 florins on 18 April 1378. In older research, this is seen as the starting point of a planned acquisition of the land of Linn by Frederick von Saarwerden, but this is an overinterpretation of the sources; Frederick never paid the money. On 9 January 1385, Frederick von Saarwerden bought Linn from Heinrich von Strüneke for 20,000 gold shields and an annuity of another 2,000 gold shields. Again, Frederick von Saarwerden did not pay any money at first.

Frederick, however, created legal grounds for a transfer of ownership. Mechthild had been in possession of Linn and had passed it on to Heinrich von Strüneke, but the owner was undisputedly the Count of Cleves, which Frederick himself had acknowledged. Now, however, Adolf of the Marck had not yet applied to Frederick von Saarwerden for the enfeoffment of the county of Cleves (most of the towns and territories of Cleves were fiefs of the Electorate of Cologne). Frederick had been granted the privilege by Emperor Charles IV in 1372 to collect escheats without male descendants as reverted. Johann of Cleves had died without heirs, which is why Frederick could claim that the county had reverted to Electorate Cologne. In addition, he had Johann's sister and wife Gottfried IV of Arnsberg give him the claims to the county of Cleves in 1377. Therefore, on 8 March 1385, Frederick enfeoffed the failed pretender of 1368, Otto von Arkel, with the county of Cleves except for "castro, opido et terra Lynnensi, which have fallen home to the archbishop and with which the archbishop does not want to enfeoff him." Otto formally documented this renunciation of Linn in his feudal charter on 7 May 1385, for himself and his family. De jure, Frederick von Saarwerden had thus skillfully made himself lord of the land and castle of Linn.

Three years later, Frederick von Saarwerden finally paid the 4,000 florins down payment to Heinrich von Strüneke before 13 July 1388, and took possession of the land of Linn; no further payments are documented. Why the archbishop had waited three years for the transfer of possession and just now alienated Adolf of the Marck, when he was at war with his brother Engelbert against Dortmund, cannot be inferred conclusively from the sources. However, the change of possession of Linn from the hands of Cleves to those of the Electorate of Cologne provided the pretext for a third feud between Adolf and Engelbert of the Mark on the one hand and Frederick von Saarwerden on the other hand in the years 1391 and 1392.

In the course of this feud, the citizens of Rees captured Count Adolf of Cleves in a spectacular action on 5 February 1391, when he crossed the Rhine in a barge at night with only one companion after a tryst with his mistress, the Abbess of Marienbaum. They released him again, however, when Engelbert of the Mark and his brother Dietrich laid siege to the city. From Wesel, horsemen made forays against Rees, Uerdingen, Linn, and Recklinghausen between March and June 1391. The town of Xanten was raided three times by Mark troops in 1391, but without success. On 21 July Frederick von Saarwerden captured Kalkar and expelled the townspeople. In turn, a ten-day war campaign by Count Engelbert of the Mark devastated the Lower Chapter of Cologne. The expulsion of the Kalkar population probably set in motion peace talks that were accelerated by the death of Engelbert III on 22 December 1391. On 10 April 1392, an atonement treaty was reached between the archbishop and Count Adolf and his sons.

Finally, on 1 May 1392, a peace treaty was concluded in which all family members of the House of Mark renounced the land of Linn. In return, the transfers in Westphalia to Engelbert from the atonement treaties of 1382 and 1384 were confirmed. On the Lower Rhine, Frederick had to cede the city and the office of Rees to the Count of Cleves. They had probably already fallen to Cleves before the end of the hostilities, at least the bailiff of Rees seals on Cleves' side in the atonement treaty of 10 April. In the peace treaty Frederick pledged the town and offset it against the land of Linn. In contrast to a transfer of ownership, the city had to remain neutral in future disputes when transferring ownership as a pledge. The rule over Xanten was divided. The Counts of Kleve had previously been the collegiate bailiffs and the Archbishop of Cologne the lord of the city, which had led to confusion over competences and permanent disputes. Here, too, a source of conflict was thus defused. Frederick was able to underline his power as Duke of the Rhineland and Westphalia once again when Adolf finally sought and received the enfeoffment of Cleves.

The Compromise Peace of 1392 lasted beyond the death of Adolf of the Mark in 1394 until the death of Frederick von Saarwerden. Frederick did not live to see the rise of Adolf's son of the same name to duke. Nor was this rise preordained, but was essentially attributable to the victory of the Count of Clever in 1397 in the Battle of Kleverhamm over his uncle William of Berg. Frederick did not take sides in this feud, but he kept William of Berg's back by treaties with him.

=== Imperial policy ===
Frederick was entirely a territorial politician and kept a low profile in imperial affairs, especially since the Lower Rhine and Westphalia, being far from the king, were hardly touched by imperial politics. The emperor generously bestowed privileges on Frederick as a future elector of his son until 1376, but these were more formal in character and of no importance in territorial politics. With the Luxemburgers Charles IV and Wenceslaus, Frederick leaned on the King of France, whose feudal lord Frederick became on 11 July 1378, for the payment of 3,000 gold francs annually.

Of the imperial privileges, the office of imperial vicar in the west stands out. Because Emperor Charles' brother Wenceslaus, Duke of Luxembourg and Brabant, was defeated in the Battle of Baesweiler in 1371 by the Dukes William of Jülich and Edward of Guelders, he could no longer exercise this office, which is why the Emperor granted it on 30 May 1372, to Frederick von Saarwerden as the most powerful imperial prince between the Scheldt and the Weser after Brabant. Frederick subsequently used the title and is also attested with official acts of a vicar. In the course of the election of Wenceslaus as Roman King, Frederick's vicariate was - among other things - extended by ten years in July 1376, but Frederick's activity as imperial vicar is only attested until 1378.

As coronation of the Holy Roman emperor, Frederick was able to place the imperial crown on Wenceslaus of Bohemia in Aachen on 6 July 1376 - the first time during the emperor's lifetime since the coronation of Henry, the son of Emperor Frederick II, on 8 May 1222. After the death of Charles IV, Frederick again received the regalia "on both sides of the Rhine, in the Duchy of Engern and Westphalia, and in the Duchy of Lorraine, as a fief from the king and the empire," on 14 September 1379, following his homage to King Wenceslaus.

In imperial affairs, Frederick coordinated with the other Rhenish electors and was therefore also one of the electors of Rupert of the Palatinate as counter-king on 20 August 1400, whom he crowned as King of the Romans in Cologne Cathedral; the city of Aachen continued to stand by the Luxemburgers and had refused entry. When Ruprecht died in 1410, Frederick and the other electors unanimously elected Sigismund as the new king.

At the beginning of his tenure, Frederick had sought privileges from the emperor in order to obtain legal rights for an active territorial policy. Charles IV also had an interest, after his brother's defeat at Baesweiler, in building up the archbishop of Cologne as a powerful aide to imperial politics and winning him as a constituent of his son. With the waning of imperial power under King Wenceslaus, Frederick von Saarwerden attempted to separate imperial and territorial affairs from 1400 at the latest.

=== Church Policy ===
Frederick paid much less attention to ecclesiastical politics than to territorial politics: "His spiritual activities took a back seat to his political activities." He sought to maintain ecclesiastical jurisdiction in the territories of his neighbors, admittedly not with religious but with sovereign-territorial intent.

Nevertheless, there are also ecclesiastical measures to record. Thus he convened a synod of the Cologne clergy as early as 1372. He modernized the church administration by creating the vicar general in 1374. In 1399, he visited the clergy and monasteries of Cologne and issued new statutes. Frederick succeeded in maintaining an independent position during the schism by allowing the publication of papal letters only after a review of his chancery, thus making direct communication with the clergy as well as the laity impossible for the pope.

Since he, together with the other electors and King Wenceslaus, had spoken out in favor of the pope in Rome (so-called Urbansbund), Pope Urban VI appointed him legate for life in May 1380. Around 1384/1385, Frederick was even to receive the cardinalate, but he declined it because of the obligations it entailed. He did not want to position himself too clearly because of his good contacts with France. Rather, he was among the princes of the church who sought an end to the schism, and so he was among the supporters of the Council of Pisa in 1409.

=== Family policy ===
On 10 September 1376, a marriage contract was concluded between Frederick von Saarwerden and Frederick of Moers, in which the archbishop gave his sister Walburga to the count of Moers as a wife. Instead of the dowry of 4,000 florins, the archbishop repaid debts of the count of Moers in this amount in Rees and Rheinberg. The archbishop was granted co-government in the county for three years. On 14 August 1379, Frederick II of Moers acknowledged receipt of all 4,000 florins. This probably also ended the joint rule over the land of Moers. Nevertheless, through the marriage Frederick assured himself of the support of this important count, whose territory intervened between the Electorate of Cologne's possessions of Rheinberg and Neuss. Through the marriage, Frederick intended to expand his influence in the north of the archdiocese. When Frederick's brother Count Heinrich III of Saarwerden died childless in 1397, the archbishop was one of the heirs, but left the county to his brother-in-law or his son, his nephew Frederick IV of Moers.

Family policy also includes Frederick's attempt to create an archbishop's union of family members. In 1388, at the ripe old age of 68, Kuno von Falkenstein had "bequeathed" the archbishopric of Trier to his and Frederick's relative Werner von Falkenstein und Königstein by appointing him coadjutor and requesting and obtaining a release from his duties from the pope. Werner also initially supported Frederick - for example in the feud with the brothers Adolf and Engelbert of the Mark 1391–1392. Together the two archbishops tried to make Frederick's relative - possibly even nephew - Gottfried of Leiningen archbishop of Mainz in 1396, for which they paid enormous bribes to the members of the cathedral chapter, one spoke of up to 110,000 florins. Pope Boniface IX, however, appointed Adolf of Nassau archbishop, who was also able to assert himself against Gottfried in 1397. In 1409 he is last mentioned as a legate of Frederick at the Council of Pisa. Werner's relationship with Frederick also broke down after 1400 because of Werner's attempt to incorporate Prüm Abbey into the archdiocese of Trier against Frederick's will. Werner was also far more incompetent than his predecessor and was eventually declared weak in spirit. The appointment of Gottfried of Leiningen as coadjutor to Werner also failed, so that a family house power of the three most important ecclesiastical principalities in the empire did not materialize.

As his own successor, Frederick raised his nephew Dietrich of Moers, the son from the marriage of Frederick of Moers and Walpurga of Saarwerden. In 1409 Frederick sent him as his deputy to the Council of Pisa. As Frederick's life drew to a close, he handed over the treasures and strongholds of the archbishopric to his nephew in order to prevent the election of the Electe of Paderborn, William VIII of Berg, younger son of Duke William II of Berg, as his successor to the archbishopric of Cologne. Dietrich was therefore able to assert himself quickly despite powerful opposition.

Frederick had his own son Henry, whom he had fathered with a Benedictine nun, dispensed from his birth defect on 13 November 1409, by Pope Alexander V, proclaimed at the Council of Pisa-who is now considered the antipope-so that he could receive ecclesiastical ordinations as well as benefices, canonries, and dignities.

=== Death ===
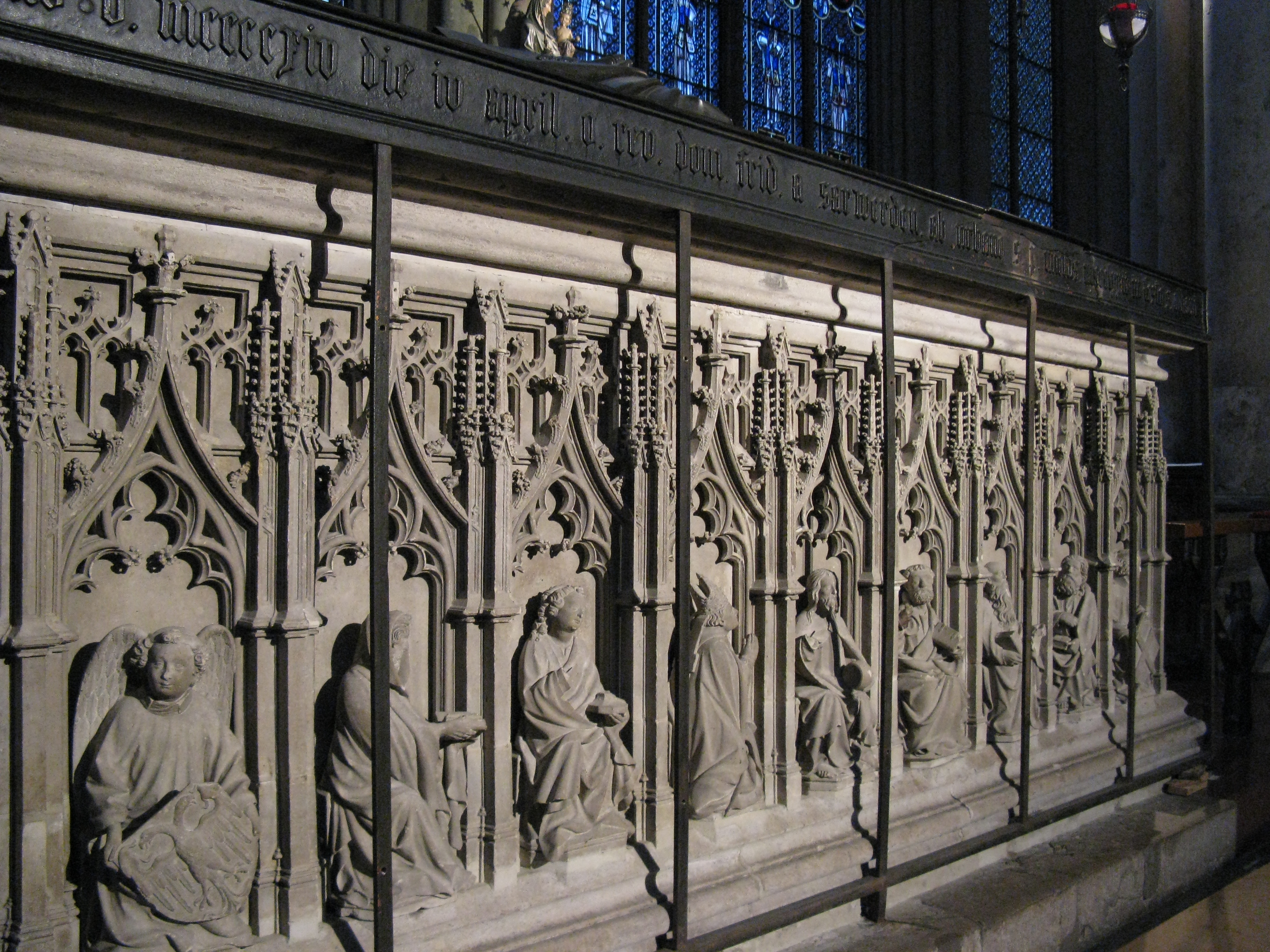
Tomb in Cologne Cathedral

Frederick died in Bonn on 9 April 1414. After his body was laid out for three days in Bonn, he was buried in a high grave in the Marienkapelle in Cologne Cathedral. Contemporaries mourned the death of this important archbishop, who had presided over the Cologne church for more than four decades. Thus, in an addendum to Levold von Northoff and in the Yearbooks of the City of Cologne, it is said about Frederick: he had been a "vir magnae constantiae" who had kept his archbishopric "in goidem regiment."

== Bibliography ==
=== Source editions ===
- Cronica van der hilligen stat van Coellen 1499 In: H. Cardanus (Bearb.): Die Chroniken der deutschen Städte vom 14. bis ins 16. Jahrhundert. 36 Bde. Leipzig 1862–1931, hier Bd. 13, 1876, pp. 253–638 und Bd. 14, 1877, pp. 641–918.
- Cronica presulum et archiepiscoporum colonienses ecclesie. Hrsg. von Gottfried Eckertz. In: Fontes adhuc inediti Rerum Rhenanarum. Köln 1864, pp. 1–64.
- Hermann Flebbe (Übers.): Levold von Northof: Die Chronik der Grafen von der Mark. Köln 1955.
- Kleve-Mark Urkunden: Regesten des Bestandes Kleve-Mark Urkunden im Nordrhein-Westfälischen Hauptstaatsarchiv. 3 Bde. Bearb. von Wolf-Rüdiger Schleidgen (Bd. I: 1223–1368 und Bd. II: 1368–1394) und Heike Preuss (Bd. III: 1394–1416). Siegburg 1983, 1986 und 2003, zitiert als KMU.
- Theodor Joseph Lacomblet: Urkundenbuch für die Geschichte des Niederrheins oder des Erzstifts Cöln, der Fürstenthümer Jülich und Berg, Geldern, Meurs, Cleve und Mark, und der Reichsstifte Elten, Essen und Werden. 4 Bde. Düsseldorf 1840–1858 (2. Neudruck der Ausgabe Düsseldorf 1858) zitiert als Lac, hier Bd. 3 (urspr. 1853): 1301–1400 und Bd. 4 (urspr. 1858): 1401–1609.
- Regesten der Erzbischöfe von Köln im Mittelalter. 12 Bde. Bonn u. a. 1901–2001 (= Publikationen der Gesellschaft für Rheinische Geschichtskunde Bd. 21), zitiert als REK, hier:

Bd. 7, Düsseldorf 1982: Bearb. von Wilhelm Janssen: 1362–1370 (Adolf von der Mark, Engelbert von der Mark, Kuno von Falkenstein),
Bd. 8, Düsseldorf 1981: Bearb. von Norbert Andernach: 1370–1380 (Frederick von Saarwerden),
Bd. 9, Düsseldorf 1983: Bearb. von Norbert Andernach: 1380–1390 (Frederick von Saarwerden),
Bd. 10, Düsseldorf 1987: Bearb. von Norbert Andernach: 1391–1400 (Frederick von Saarwerden),
Bd. 11, Düsseldorf 1992: Bearb. von Norbert Andernach: 1401–1410 (Frederick von Saarwerden),
Bd. 12/1, Düsseldorf 1995: Bearb. von Norbert Andernach: 1411–1414 (Frederick von Saarwerden),
Bd. 12/2, Düsseldorf 2001: Bearb. von Norbert Andernach: Namen- und Sachindex zu den Bänden 8–12.1. (1378–1414).

- Heinrich Volbert Sauerland (Bearb.): Urkunden und Regesten zur Geschichte der Rheinlande aus dem Vatikanischen Archiv. 7 Bde. Bonn 1902–1913 (Bde. VI und VII hrsg. von H. Timme), hier:

=== Displays ===
- Max Barkhausen: Wie Linn Kölnisch geworden ist. Ein Betrag zur niederrheinischen Territorialgeschichte im 13. und 14. Jahrhundert. In: Ders.: Aus Territorial- und Wirtschaftsgeschichte. Ausgewählte Aufsätze. Krefeld 1963, pp. 34–55.
- Max Barkhausen: Die Grafen von Moers als Typus kleiner Territorialherren des späten Mittelalters. In: Ders.: Aus Territorial- und Wirtschaftsgeschichte. Ausgewählte Aufsätze. Krefeld 1963, pp. 56–107.
- Karlotto Bogumil: Die Stadt Köln, Erzbischof Friedrich von Saarwerden und die päpstliche Kurie während der ersten Jahre des großen abendländischen Schismas (1375–1387). In: Hugo Stehkämper (Hrsg.): Köln, das Reich und Europa. Abhandlungen über weiträumige Verflechtungen der Stadt Köln in Politik, Recht und Wirtschaft im Mittelalter. Köln 1971 (= Mitteilungen aus dem Stadtarchiv von Köln Bd. 60), pp. 279–303.
- Georg Droege: Verfassung und Wirtschaft in Kurköln unter Dietrich von Moers (1414–1463). Bonn 1957 (= Rheinisches Archiv Bd. 50) (zugl. Diss. Universität Bonn 1955).
- Georg Droege: Das kölnische Herzogtum. In: Wolf-Dieter Mohrmann (Hrsg.): Heinrich der Löwe. Göttingen 1980, pp. 275–304.
- Georg Droege: Die Herzogsgewalt in Westfalen. In: Peter Berghaus, Siegfried Kessemeier (Hrsg.): Köln – Westfalen 1180–1980. Landesgeschichte zwischen Rhein und Weser. Landschaftsverband Westfalen-Lippe, Münster 1980, Bd. 1, pp. 220–225.
- Leonhard Ennen: Friedrich III. (Erzbischof von Köln). In: Allgemeine Deutsche Biographie (ADB). Band 7, Duncker & Humblot, Leipzig 1877, pp. 538–543.
- Jens Friedhoff: Burg Lechenich im Kontext der spätmittelalterlichen Residenzentwicklung im Erzstift Köln. In: Annalen des Historischen Vereins für den Niederrhein. Bd. 204, 2001, pp. 125–155.
- Robert Haaß (1961). "Friedrich III., Graf von Saarwerden". Neue Deutsche Biographie (in German). Vol. 5. Berlin: Duncker & Humblot. pp. 511–512. (full text online).
- Aenne Hansmann: Geschichte von Stadt und Amt Zons. Mit einem Beitrag von Artur Elicker, Jakob Justenhoven und Herbert Milz. Düsseldorf 1973.
- Hans-Walter Herrmann: Geschichte der Grafschaft Saarwerden bis zum Jahre 1527. 2 Bände, Saarbrücken 1957–1962, zugleich Dissertation, Saarbrücken 1959.
- Wilhelm Janssen: Zur Verwaltung des Erzstiftes Köln unter Erzbischof Walram von Jülich (1332–1349). In: Hans Blum (Hrsg.): Aus kölnischer und rheinischer Geschichte. Festgabe Arnold Güttsches. (=Veröffentlichungen des Kölner Geschichtsvereins 29) Köln 1969, pp. 1–40.
- Wilhelm Janssen: Karl IV. und die Lande an Niederrhein und unterer Untermaas. In: Blätter für Deutsche Landesgeschichte. Bd. 114, 1978, pp. 203–241.
- Wilhelm Janssen: Das Erzstift Köln in Westfalen. In: Peter Berghaus und Siegfried Kessemeier (Hrsg.): Köln – Westfalen 1180–1980. Landesgeschichte zwischen Rhein und Weser. Münster 1980, S. 136–142.
- Wilhelm Janssen: Die mensa episcopalis der Kölner Erzbischöfe im Spätmittelalter. In: Hans Patze (Hrsg.): Die Grundherrschaft im späten Mittelalter. 2 Bde. Sigmaringen 1983 (= Verwaltung und Forschung Bd. 27), Bd. I, pp. 313–341.
- Wilhelm Janssen: Die Kanzlei der Erzbischöfe von Köln im Spätmittelalter. In: Gabriel Silagi (Hrsg.): Landesherrliche Kanzleien im Spätmittelalter. Referate zum VI. Internationalen Kongreß für Diplomatik. München 1983. Teil-Bd. I. München 1984 (= Münchener Beiträge zur Mediävistik und Renaissance-Forschung Bd. 35), pp. 147–169.
- Wilhelm Janssen: Der Bischof, Reichsfürst und Landesherr (14. und 15. Jahrhundert). In: Peter Berglar und Odilo Engels (Hrsg.): Der Bischof in seiner Zeit. Bischofstypus und Bischofsideal im Spiegel der Kölner Kirche. Festgabe für Joseph Kardinal Höffner, Erzbischof von Köln. Köln 1986, ISBN 978-3-7616-0862-3, pp. 185–244.
- Wilhelm Janssen: Mitwirkungsrechte und -ansprüche des Kölner Domkapitels an der Regierung des Erzbistums während des späteren Mittelalters. In: Bonner Geschichtsblätter. Bd. 42, 1992, pp. 71–92.
- Wilhelm Janssen: Episcopus et dux, animarum pastor et dominus temporalis. Bemerkungen zur Problematik des geistlichen Fürstentums am Kölner Beispiel. In: Wilhelm Janssen, Wolfgang Herborn und Marlene Nikolay-Panter (Hrsg.): Geschichtliche Landeskunde der Rheinlande. Regionale Befunde und raumübergreifende Perspektiven. Köln, Weimar und Wien 1994, pp. 216–235.
- Wilhelm Janssen: Geschichte des Erzbistums Köln. 5 Bde. Köln 1987–2003, hier Bd. 2, Teil-Bd. 1 (1995): Das Erzbistum Köln im späten Mittelalter 1191–1515.
- Wilhelm Janssen: Die niederrheinischen Territorien im Spätmittelalter. Politische Geschichte und Verfassungsentwicklung 1300–1500. In: Rheinische Vierteljahrsblätter, Bd. 64, 2000, pp. 45–167.
- Wilhelm Janssen: Beobachtungen zur Struktur und Finanzierung des kurkölnischen Hofes im späten 14. und 15. Jh. In: Rheinische Vierteljahrsblätter, Bd. 69, 2005, pp. 104–132.
- Willi Nikolay: Die Ausbildung der ständischen Verfassung in Geldern und Brabant während des 13. und 14. Jahrhunderts. Ein Beitrag zur Konsolidierung mittelalterlicher Territorien im Nordwesten des Alten Deutschen Reiches. Bonn 1985 (=Rheinisches Archiv 118).
- Josef Niesen: Bonner Personenlexikon. Bouvier, Bonn 2007, ISBN 978-3-416-03159-2
- Friedrich Pfeiffer: Rheinische Transitzölle im Mittelalter. Berlin 1997 (zugl. Diss. Trier 1996).
- Friedrich Pfeiffer: Transitzölle 1000–1500. Köln 2000 (= Geschichtlicher Atlas der Rheinlande, Beiheft VII/10).
- Sabine Picot: Kurkölnische Territorialpolitik am Rhein unter Erzbischof Friedrich von Saarwerden 1370–1414. Bonn 1977(= Rheinisches Archiv Bd. 99) (zugl. Diss. Uni. Bonn 1975).
- Monika Storm: Die Metropolitangewalt der Kölner Erzbischöfe im Mittelalter bis zu Dietrich von Moers. Siegburg 1995 (= Studien zur Kölner Kirchengeschichte Bd. 29).
- Erich Wisplinghoff: Geschichte der Stadt Neuss von den mittelalterlichen Anfängen bis zum Jahre 1794. Neuss 1975.
- Christoph Waldecker: Friedrich von Saarwerden (1348–1414). In: Lebensbilder aus dem Kreis Neuss 4. Dormagen 1999. pp. 32–43.
- Christoph Waldecker (2004). "Friedrich III von Saarwerden". In Bautz, Traugott (ed.). Biographisch-Bibliographisches Kirchenlexikon (BBKL) (in German). Vol. 23. Nordhausen: Bautz. cols. 433–438. ISBN 3-88309-155-3.
