= Alsace bossue =

Coordinates: 7.0894°N 48.9414°E

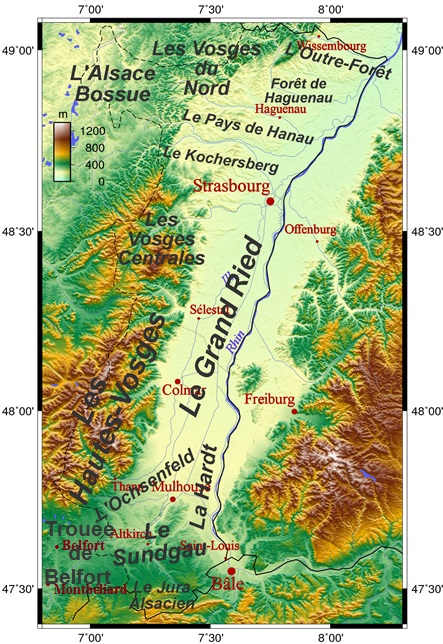
Alsace bossue (in the upper left)

The Alsace bossue (Alemannic and Frankish: S'Gromme/S'Krumme Elsass, German: das krumme Elsass/ Krummes Elsass), is a territory of Bas-Rhin in Alsace, which includes the three former cantons of Sarre-Union, Drulingen and La Petite-Pierre (today all part of the canton of Ingwiller).

Just like nearby parts of Lorraine, the Alsace bossue is linguistically predominantly located into the Rhine Franconian area.

== History ==
The current borders of this territory date back from 1793, when the County of Saarwerden was annexed by the young French First Republic.

Initially, the county of Saarwerden was meant to be fragmented and distributed between the departments of Moselle, Meurthe and/or Bas-Rhin, but its inhabitants were against the fragmentation, and as such the project was afterwards cancelled. The county was then temporarily absorbed by the nearby districts of Moselle and Meurthe until a final decision was made. Towards the end of the year 1793, it was finally decided that the entire territory would be given to the Bas-Rhin department, essentially due to religious reasons, as the Sarrewerden county had been Protestant since the Reformation while Lorraine (Moselle and Meurthe) had remained almost exclusively Catholic. At the same time, the Moselle department gave to Bas-Rhin the municipalities of Bouquenom and Vieux Sarverden (today Sarrewerden), both historical capitals of the Saarwerden county, which had been enclaves of the Duchy of Lorraine or the Kingdom of France within the county since 1697.

Another county that is often considered to be a part of Alsace bossue was the County of Lützelstein (comté de la Petite-Pierre), which belonged to the Rhine Palatinate throughout most of its existence. Although most of the county is today part of the Bas-Rhin department, some of its historical villages, including Achen, Berling, Bourscheid, Hangviller, Lixheim, Montbronn, Phalsbourg, Vescheim, Wintersbourg and Zilling, are today part of the Moselle department.
