= Gœrlingen =

- Commune
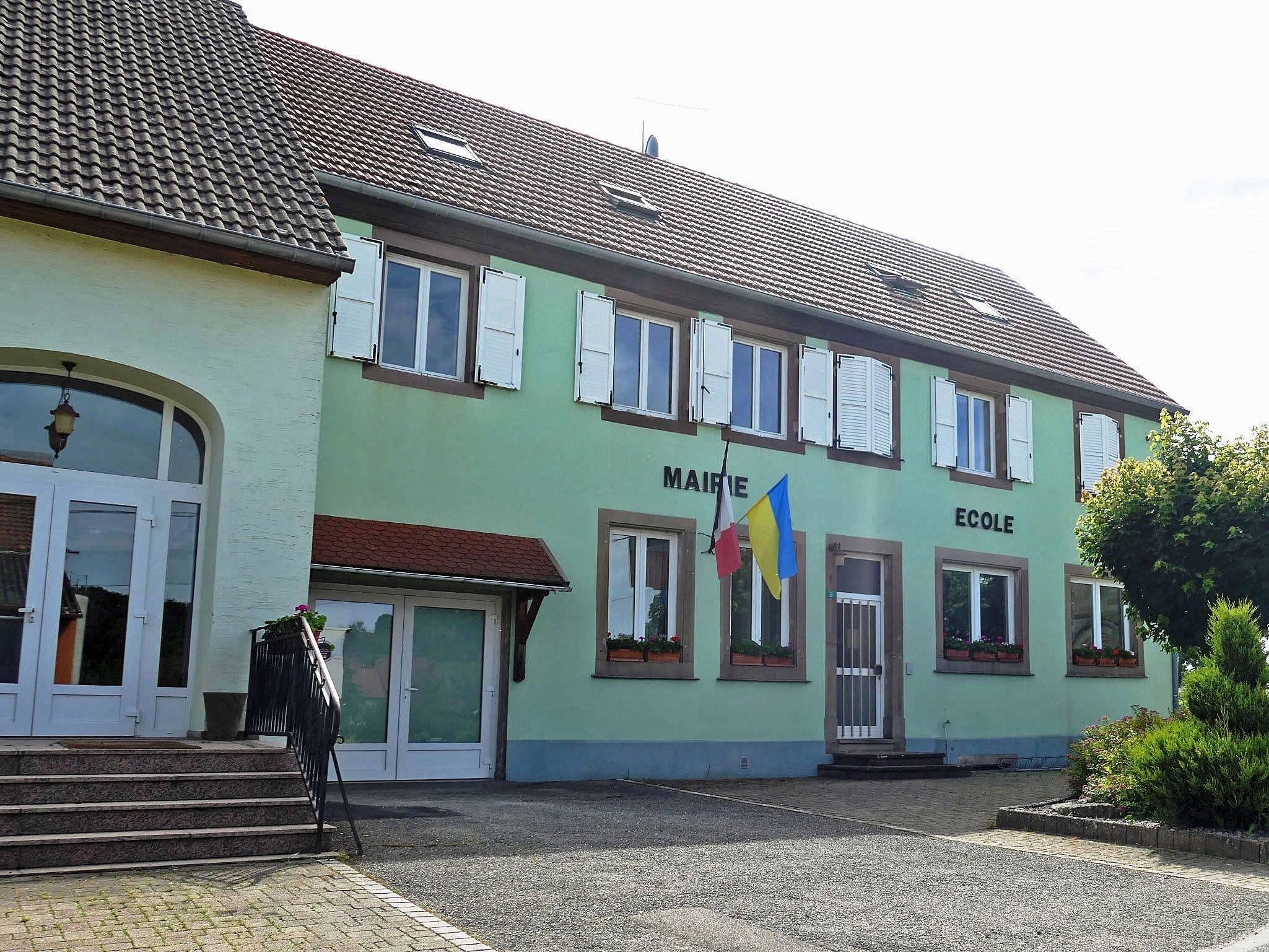
- Gœrlingen Town hall

- Coat of arms
- Location of Gœrlingen
- Location within France Location within Grand Est
- Coordinates: 48°47′48″N 7°04′59″E
- Country: France
- Region: Grand Est
- Department: Bas-Rhin
- Arrondissement: Saverne
- Canton: Ingwiller

Government
  - Mayor (2020–2026): Christophe Jung
- Area^{1}: 3.77 km^{2} (1.46 sq mi)
- Highest elevation: 332 m (1,089 ft)
- Lowest elevation: 252 m (827 ft)
- Population (2023): 210
  - Density: 56/km^{2} (140/sq mi)
- Time zone: UTC+01:00 (CET)
  - Summer (DST): UTC+02:00 (CEST)
- INSEE/Postal code: 67159 /67320
- ^{1} French Land Register data, which excludes lakes, ponds, glaciers > 1 km^{2} (0.386 sq mi or 247 acres) and river estuaries.

Gœrlingen (French pronunciation: [gœʁliŋ(ɡ)ən]; German: Görlingen) is a commune in the Bas-Rhin department in Grand Est in north-eastern France.

== History ==
There is evidence of the site having been occupied by a leading family during the Gallo-Roman period. By the thirteenth century Gœrlingen (albeit not spelled according to twenty-first century spelling) was numbered among the parishes under the archpriests of Bockenheim, the village being under the county of Sarrewerden to which the tithe was paid. In 1314 Gœrlingen was listed among the assets of the Abbey of Lixheim, but by 1542, when fears of a further Turkish attack on Vienna prompted a general census of assets in the empire, Gœrlingen had disappeared from the Lixheim records.

In 1557 the County of Nassau-Sarrewerden allocated seven deserted villages, of which Gœrlingen was one, to Huguenot recusants from Normandy, Lorraine and elsewhere. The wars of the seventeenth century forced the citizens to flee towards the Palatinate or the Bischwiller district. The church was destroyed in 1685. Subsequent repopulation was achieved through the arrival of Swiss refugees from Calvinist extremism. In 1793 the county found itself annexed to the new French Republic, but this time was spared the violent upheavals characteristic of the revolutionary period in other parts of France. The nineteenth century was relatively tranquil for Gœrlingen, though the commune shared in full the sacrifice of young lives in support of the wars of 1871, 1914 and 1939, during which period Gœrlingen would find itself tossed backwards and forwards between France and Germany.

== See also ==
- Communes of the Bas-Rhin department
