= Herbitzheim =

- Commune
- Coat of arms
- Location of Herbitzheim
- Location within France Location within Grand Est
- Coordinates: 49°00′56″N 7°05′06″E
- Country: France
- Region: Grand Est
- Department: Bas-Rhin
- Arrondissement: Saverne
- Canton: Ingwiller

Government
  - Mayor (2020–2026): Michel Kuffler
- Area^{1}: 21.73 km^{2} (8.39 sq mi)
- Highest elevation: 282 m (925 ft)
- Lowest elevation: 203 m (666 ft)
- Population (2023): 1,829
  - Density: 84.17/km^{2} (218.0/sq mi)
- Time zone: UTC+01:00 (CET)
  - Summer (DST): UTC+02:00 (CEST)
- INSEE/Postal code: 67191 /67260
- ^{1} French Land Register data, which excludes lakes, ponds, glaciers > 1 km^{2} (0.386 sq mi or 247 acres) and river estuaries.

Herbitzheim (French pronunciation: [ɛʁbitsaim]) is a commune in the Bas-Rhin department in Grand Est in north-eastern France.

Herbitzheim is one of 45 member communes of the Communauté de communes de l'Alsace Bossue.

== Location ==
The village is located in the north west of Alsace, on the Canal de la Sarre at the point where the little river Eichel flows into the Saar.

Surrounding communes are Siltzheim to the north, Oermingen in the south-east and Keskastel to the south. To the west the commune is on the border with Sarreguemines in the adjacent Moselle département.

== Notable people ==
- Thomas Voeckler, cyclist, grew up in Herbitzheim

== See also ==
- Communes of the Bas-Rhin department
