= Keskastel =

Keskastel Kàschel
- Commune
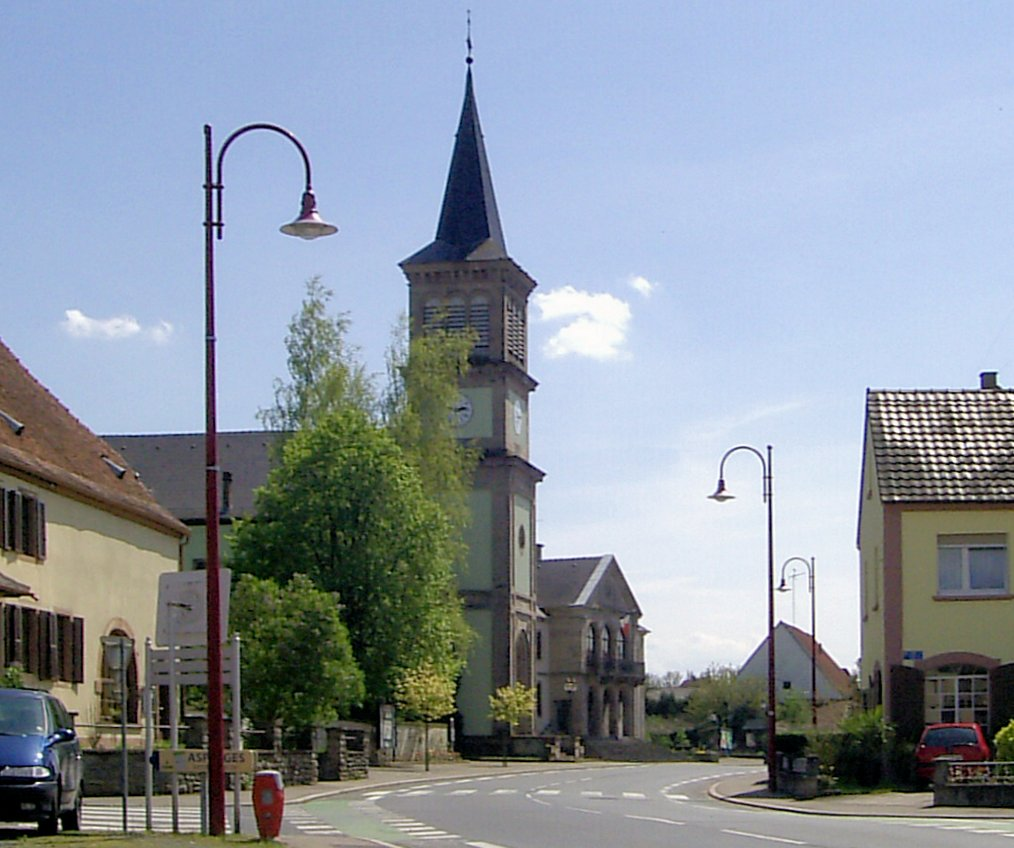
- The Lutheran church in Keskastel

- Coat of arms
- Location of Keskastel
- Location within France Location within Grand Est
- Coordinates: 48°58′19″N 7°02′41″E
- Country: France
- Region: Grand Est
- Department: Bas-Rhin
- Arrondissement: Saverne
- Canton: Ingwiller

Government
  - Mayor (2020–2026): Gabriel Glath
- Area^{1}: 18.87 km^{2} (7.29 sq mi)
- Highest elevation: 275 m (902 ft)
- Lowest elevation: 209 m (686 ft)
- Population (2023): 1,487
  - Density: 78.80/km^{2} (204.1/sq mi)
- Time zone: UTC+01:00 (CET)
  - Summer (DST): UTC+02:00 (CEST)
- INSEE/Postal code: 67234 /67260
- ^{1} French Land Register data, which excludes lakes, ponds, glaciers > 1 km^{2} (0.386 sq mi or 247 acres) and river estuaries.

Keskastel (French pronunciation: [kɛskastɛl]) is a commune in the northwest of the Bas-Rhin department in Grand Est in north-eastern France.

== Geography ==
Kernkastel is positioned on the banks of the Saar. Surrounding communes are Herbitzheim and Sarralbe to the north with Schopperten and Sarre-Union to the south.

The village is the meeting point of several roads, the largest of them being the Route Nationale RN61 (Phalsbourg - Saarbrücken). The A4 Autoroute (E25) passes to the east, at which point the village hosts a service area and there are a couple of bridges overlooking the autoroute, but there is no road access to the highway: junctions 42 and 43 are approximately ten kilometres (six miles) to the north and south respectively. The village does, however, have its own station on the local railway line.

One pillar of the local economy is tourism. There is a camping place with a bathing area: angling facilities are also available, and the village is positioned on a long distance walking path that tracks the Saar.

== Population ==
Historical population
Year	Pop.	±% p.a.
1968	1,366	—
1975	1,297	−0.74%
1982	1,316	+0.21%
1990	1,362	+0.43%
1999	1,438	+0.61%
2007	1,541	+0.87%
2012	1,612	+0.90%
2017	1,520	−1.17%
2023	1,487	−0.37%
Source: INSEE

== See also ==
- Communes of the Bas-Rhin department
