= Burbach, Bas-Rhin =

Burbach Burbàch
- Commune
- Coat of arms
- Location of Burbach
- Location within France Location within Grand Est
- Coordinates: 48°54′06″N 7°06′45″E
- Country: France
- Region: Grand Est
- Department: Bas-Rhin
- Arrondissement: Saverne
- Canton: Ingwiller

Government
  - Mayor (2020–2026): Christian Klein
- Area^{1}: 6.34 km^{2} (2.45 sq mi)
- Highest elevation: 348 m (1,142 ft)
- Lowest elevation: 238 m (781 ft)
- Population (2023): 280
  - Density: 44/km^{2} (110/sq mi)
- Time zone: UTC+01:00 (CET)
  - Summer (DST): UTC+02:00 (CEST)
- INSEE/Postal code: 67070 /67260
- ^{1} French Land Register data, which excludes lakes, ponds, glaciers > 1 km^{2} (0.386 sq mi or 247 acres) and river estuaries.

Burbach is a commune in the Bas-Rhin department in Grand Est in north-eastern France.

== See also ==
- Communes of the Bas-Rhin department
