= Eywiller =

Eywiller Äiwiller
- Commune
- Coat of arms
- Location of Eywiller
- Location within France Location within Grand Est
- Coordinates: 48°52′17″N 7°07′55″E
- Country: France
- Region: Grand Est
- Department: Bas-Rhin
- Arrondissement: Saverne
- Canton: Ingwiller

Government
  - Mayor (2020–2026): Marcel Hoehn
- Area^{1}: 4.69 km^{2} (1.81 sq mi)
- Highest elevation: 357 m (1,171 ft)
- Lowest elevation: 270 m (890 ft)
- Population (2023): 274
  - Density: 58.4/km^{2} (151/sq mi)
- Time zone: UTC+01:00 (CET)
  - Summer (DST): UTC+02:00 (CEST)
- INSEE/Postal code: 67136 /67320
- ^{1} French Land Register data, which excludes lakes, ponds, glaciers > 1 km^{2} (0.386 sq mi or 247 acres) and river estuaries.

Eywiller (German: Eyweiler) is a commune in the Bas-Rhin department in Grand Est in north-eastern France.

== See also ==
- Communes of the Bas-Rhin department
