= Siltzheim =

- Commune
- Coat of arms
- Location of Siltzheim
- Location within France Location within Grand Est
- Coordinates: 49°03′47″N 7°05′39″E
- Country: France
- Region: Grand Est
- Department: Bas-Rhin
- Arrondissement: Saverne
- Canton: Ingwiller
- Intercommunality: CA Sarreguemines Confluences

Government
  - Mayor (2020–2026): Sébastien Schmitt
- Area^{1}: 6.96 km^{2} (2.69 sq mi)
- Highest elevation: 287 m (942 ft)
- Lowest elevation: 200 m (660 ft)
- Population (2023): 614
  - Density: 88.2/km^{2} (228/sq mi)
- Time zone: UTC+01:00 (CET)
  - Summer (DST): UTC+02:00 (CEST)
- INSEE/Postal code: 67468 /67260
- ^{1} French Land Register data, which excludes lakes, ponds, glaciers > 1 km^{2} (0.386 sq mi or 247 acres) and river estuaries.

Siltzheim (French pronunciation: [siltsaim]; German: Silzheim) is a commune in the Bas-Rhin department in Grand Est in north-eastern France.

== See also ==
- Communes of the Bas-Rhin department
