= Sarrewerden =

- Commune
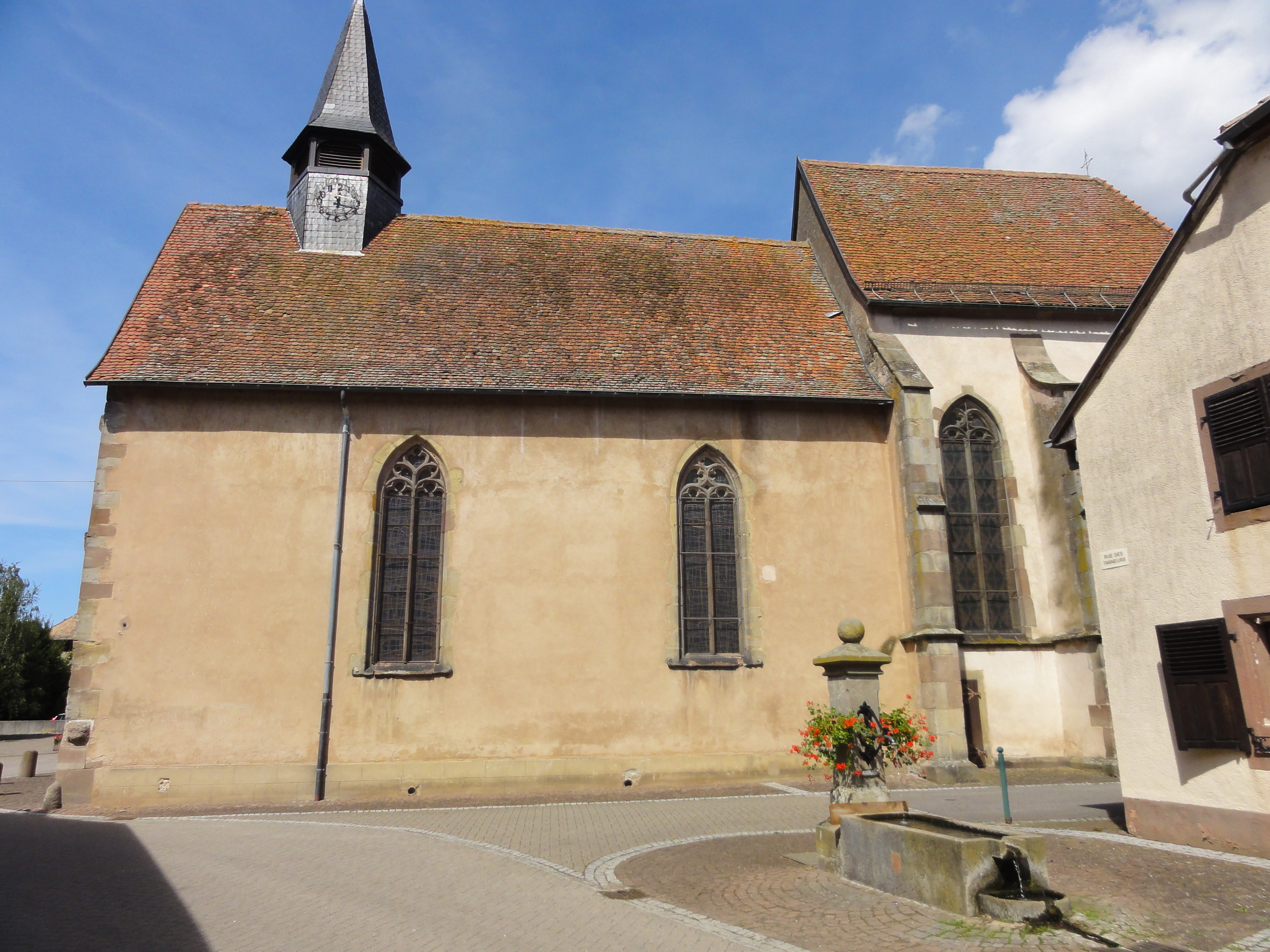
- The church in Sarrewerden

- Coat of arms
- Location of Sarrewerden
- Location within France Location within Grand Est
- Coordinates: 48°55′25″N 7°05′04″E
- Country: France
- Region: Grand Est
- Department: Bas-Rhin
- Arrondissement: Saverne
- Canton: Ingwiller

Government
  - Mayor (2020–2026): Jean-Joseph Taesch
- Area^{1}: 16.73 km^{2} (6.46 sq mi)
- Highest elevation: 336 m (1,102 ft)
- Lowest elevation: 217 m (712 ft)
- Population (2023): 816
  - Density: 48.8/km^{2} (126/sq mi)
- Time zone: UTC+01:00 (CET)
  - Summer (DST): UTC+02:00 (CEST)
- INSEE/Postal code: 67435 /67260
- ^{1} French Land Register data, which excludes lakes, ponds, glaciers > 1 km^{2} (0.386 sq mi or 247 acres) and river estuaries.

Sarrewerden (French pronunciation: [saʁvɛʁdœn]; German: Saarwerden) is a commune in the Bas-Rhin department in Grand Est in northeastern France.

The localities of Bischtroff-sur-Sarre and Zollingen are incorporated in the commune since 1972. It gave its name to the medieval County of Saarwerden.

== See also ==
- Communes of the Bas-Rhin department
