= Sarre-Union =

- Commune
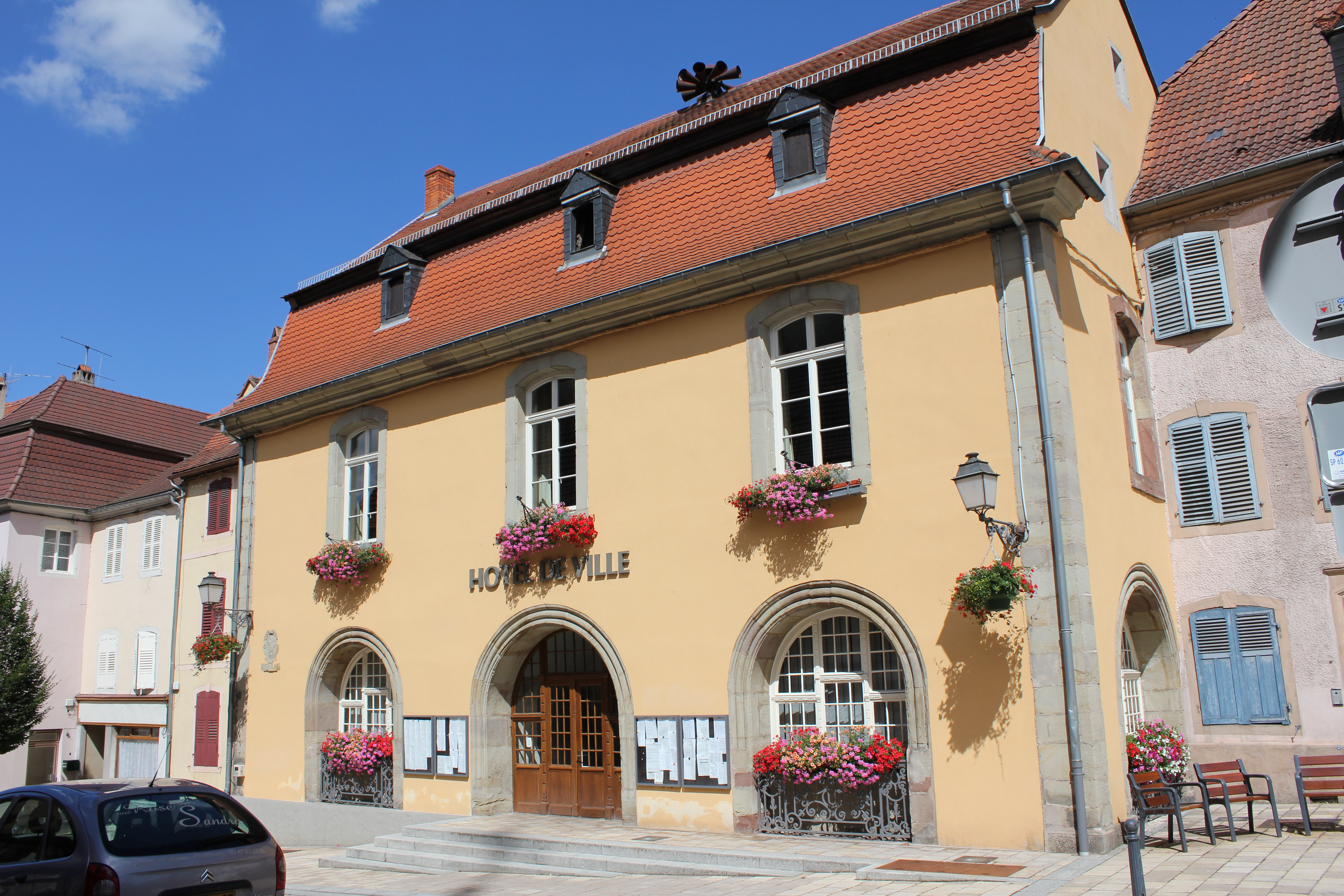
- The town hall in Sarre-Union

- Coat of arms
- Location of Sarre-Union
- Location within France Location within Grand Est
- Coordinates: 48°56′N 7°05′E
- Country: France
- Region: Grand Est
- Department: Bas-Rhin
- Arrondissement: Saverne
- Canton: Ingwiller

Government
  - Mayor (2020–2026): Marc Séné
- Area^{1}: 15.39 km^{2} (5.94 sq mi)
- Highest elevation: 330 m (1,080 ft)
- Lowest elevation: 217 m (712 ft)
- Population (2023): 2,731
  - Density: 177.5/km^{2} (459.6/sq mi)
- Time zone: UTC+01:00 (CET)
  - Summer (DST): UTC+02:00 (CEST)
- INSEE/Postal code: 67434 /67260
- ^{1} French Land Register data, which excludes lakes, ponds, glaciers > 1 km^{2} (0.386 sq mi or 247 acres) and river estuaries.

Sarre-Union (French pronunciation: [saʁ ynjɔ̃]; German: Saarunion) is a commune in the Bas-Rhin department in Grand Est in north-eastern France.

It consists of two older towns that were unified on 16 June 1794. On the east bank of the river Sarre is the town of Bouquenom (German: Bockenheim) and on the west bank the town of Ville Neuve de Sarrewerden (German: Neu-Saarwerden). It was renamed Saar-Buckenheim between 1940 and 1944 during Nazi Germany occupation.

== Population ==
Historical population
Year	Pop.	±% p.a.
1968	2,965	—
1975	3,130	+0.78%
1982	3,169	+0.18%
1990	3,159	−0.04%
1999	3,356	+0.67%
2007	3,161	−0.75%
2012	2,961	−1.30%
2017	2,823	−0.95%
2023	2,731	−0.55%
Source: INSEE

== Sports ==
- Basket Club Alsace Bossue

== See also ==
- Communes of the Bas-Rhin department
