= Bourscheid =

Bourscheid may refer to the following places:

- Bourscheid, Luxembourg
  - Bourscheid Castle
- Bourscheid, Moselle, France

== See also ==
- Burscheid, Germany
