= Barchain =

- Commune
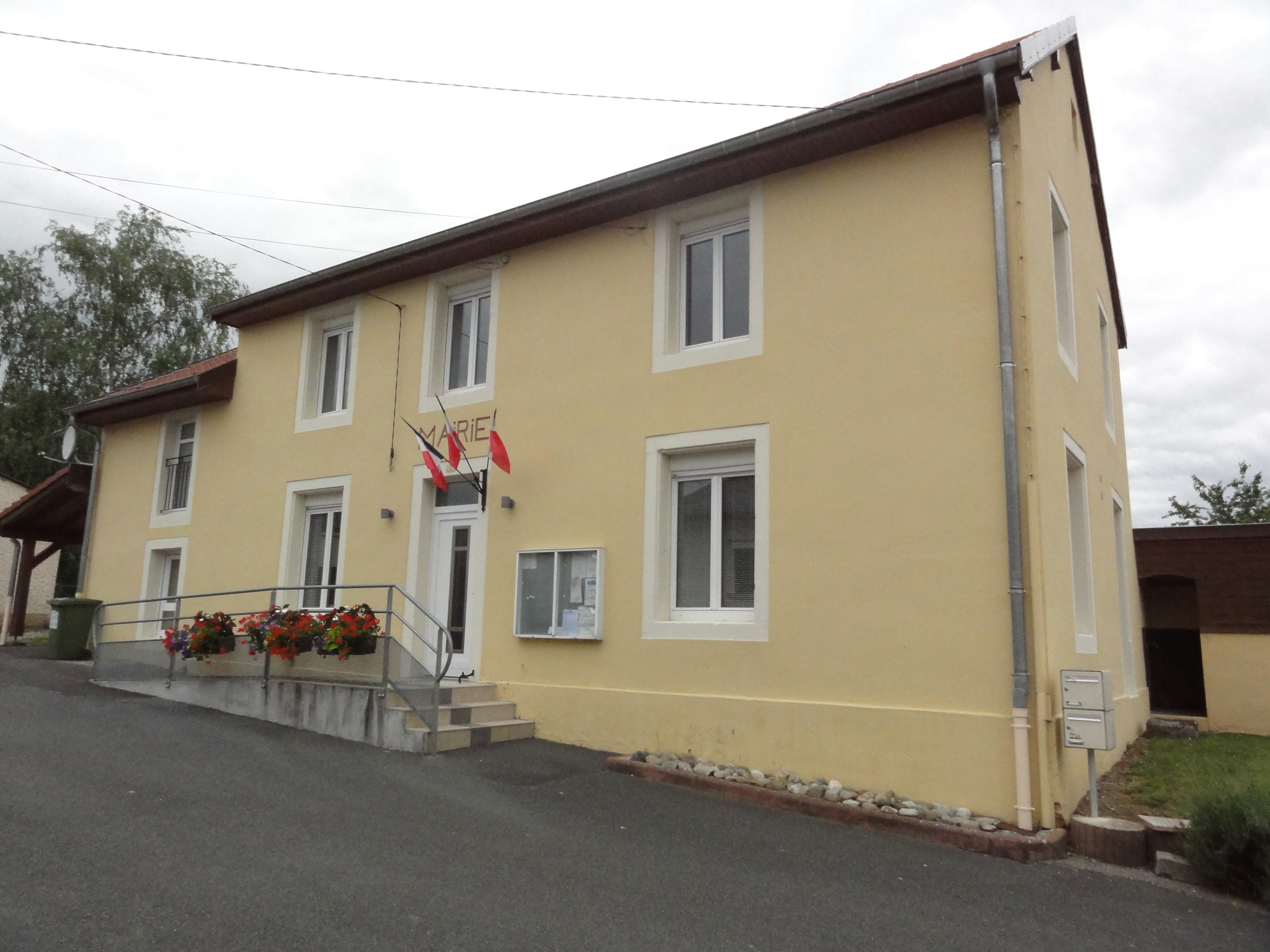
- The town hall in Barchain

- Coat of arms
- Location of Barchain
- Location within France Location within Grand Est
- Coordinates: 48°42′29″N 6°57′47″E
- Country: France
- Region: Grand Est
- Department: Moselle
- Arrondissement: Sarrebourg-Château-Salins
- Canton: Phalsbourg

Government
  - Mayor (2020–2026): Roger Unternehr
- Area^{1}: 1.7 km^{2} (0.66 sq mi)
- Highest elevation: 312 m (1,024 ft)
- Lowest elevation: 282 m (925 ft)
- Population (2023): 94
  - Density: 55/km^{2} (140/sq mi)
- Time zone: UTC+01:00 (CET)
  - Summer (DST): UTC+02:00 (CEST)
- INSEE/Postal code: 57050 /57830
- ^{1} French Land Register data, which excludes lakes, ponds, glaciers > 1 km^{2} (0.386 sq mi or 247 acres) and river estuaries.

Barchain (French pronunciation: [baʁʃɛ̃]; German: Barchingen) is a commune in the Moselle department in Grand Est in northeastern France.

== Population ==
Historical population
| Year | Pop. | ±% p.a. |
|---|---|---|
| 1968 | 95 | — |
| 1975 | 99 | +0.59% |
| 1982 | 109 | +1.38% |
| 1990 | 101 | −0.95% |
| 1999 | 99 | −0.22% |
| 2007 | 109 | +1.21% |
| 2012 | 112 | +0.54% |
| 2017 | 110 | −0.36% |
| 2023 | 94 | −2.59% |
Source: INSEE

== See also ==
- Communes of the Moselle department
