= Harreberg =

- Commune
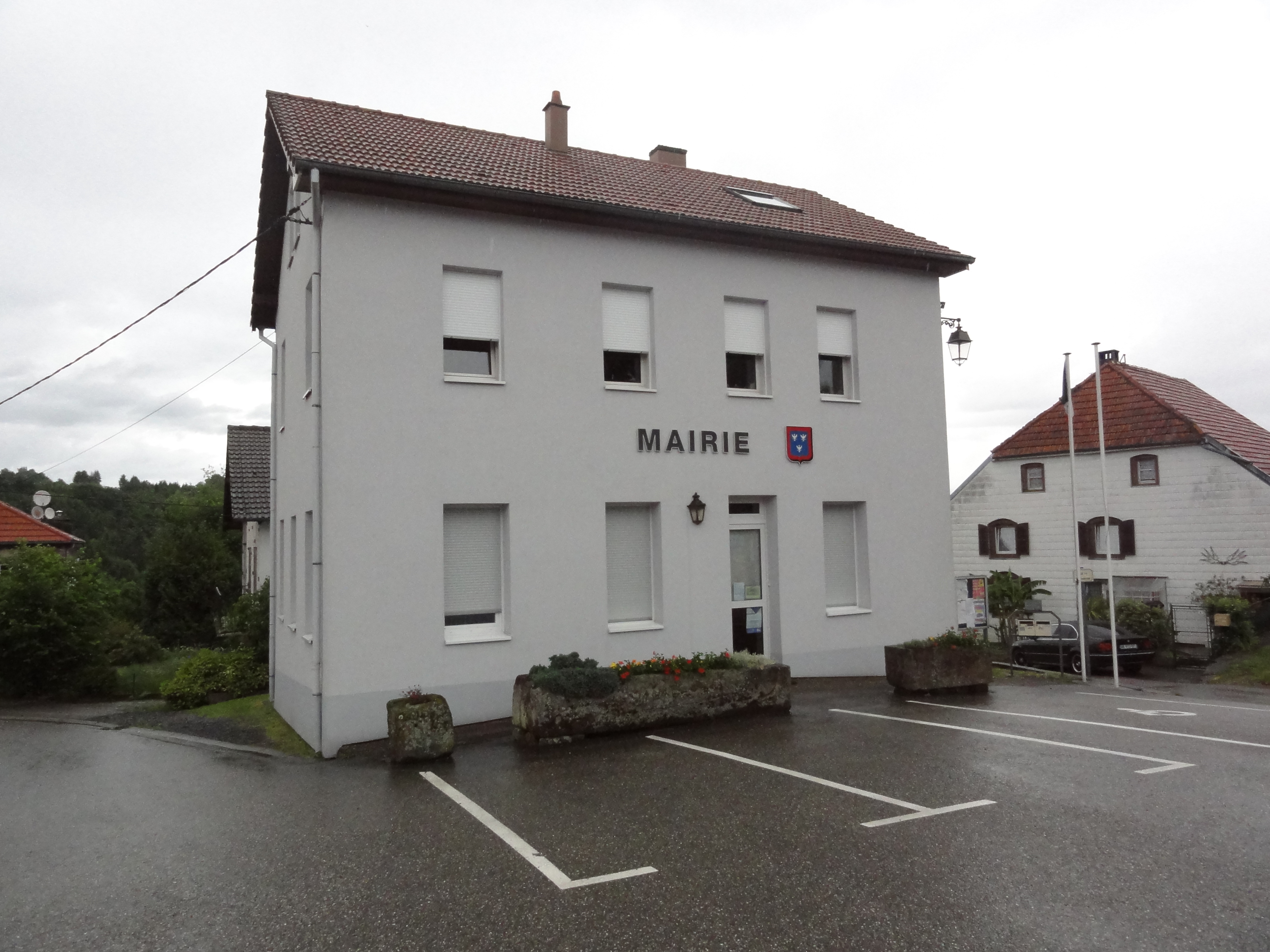
- The town hall in Harreberg

- Coat of arms
- Location of Harreberg
- Location within France Location within Grand Est
- Coordinates: 48°40′00″N 7°10′16″E
- Country: France
- Region: Grand Est
- Department: Moselle
- Arrondissement: Sarrebourg-Château-Salins
- Canton: Phalsbourg
- Intercommunality: CC Sarrebourg Moselle Sud

Government
  - Mayor (2020–2026): Philippe Michel
- Area^{1}: 6.34 km^{2} (2.45 sq mi)
- Elevation: 440 m (1,440 ft)
- Highest elevation: 505 m (1,657 ft)
- Lowest elevation: 259 m (850 ft)
- Population (2023): 369
  - Density: 58.2/km^{2} (151/sq mi)
- Time zone: UTC+01:00 (CET)
  - Summer (DST): UTC+02:00 (CEST)
- INSEE/Postal code: 57298 /57870
- ^{1} French Land Register data, which excludes lakes, ponds, glaciers > 1 km^{2} (0.386 sq mi or 247 acres) and river estuaries.

Harreberg (French pronunciation: [aʁbɛʁ]; German: Haarberg) is a commune in the Moselle department in Grand Est in north-eastern France.

== See also ==
- Communes of the Moselle department
