= Aspach, Moselle =

Aspach
- Commune
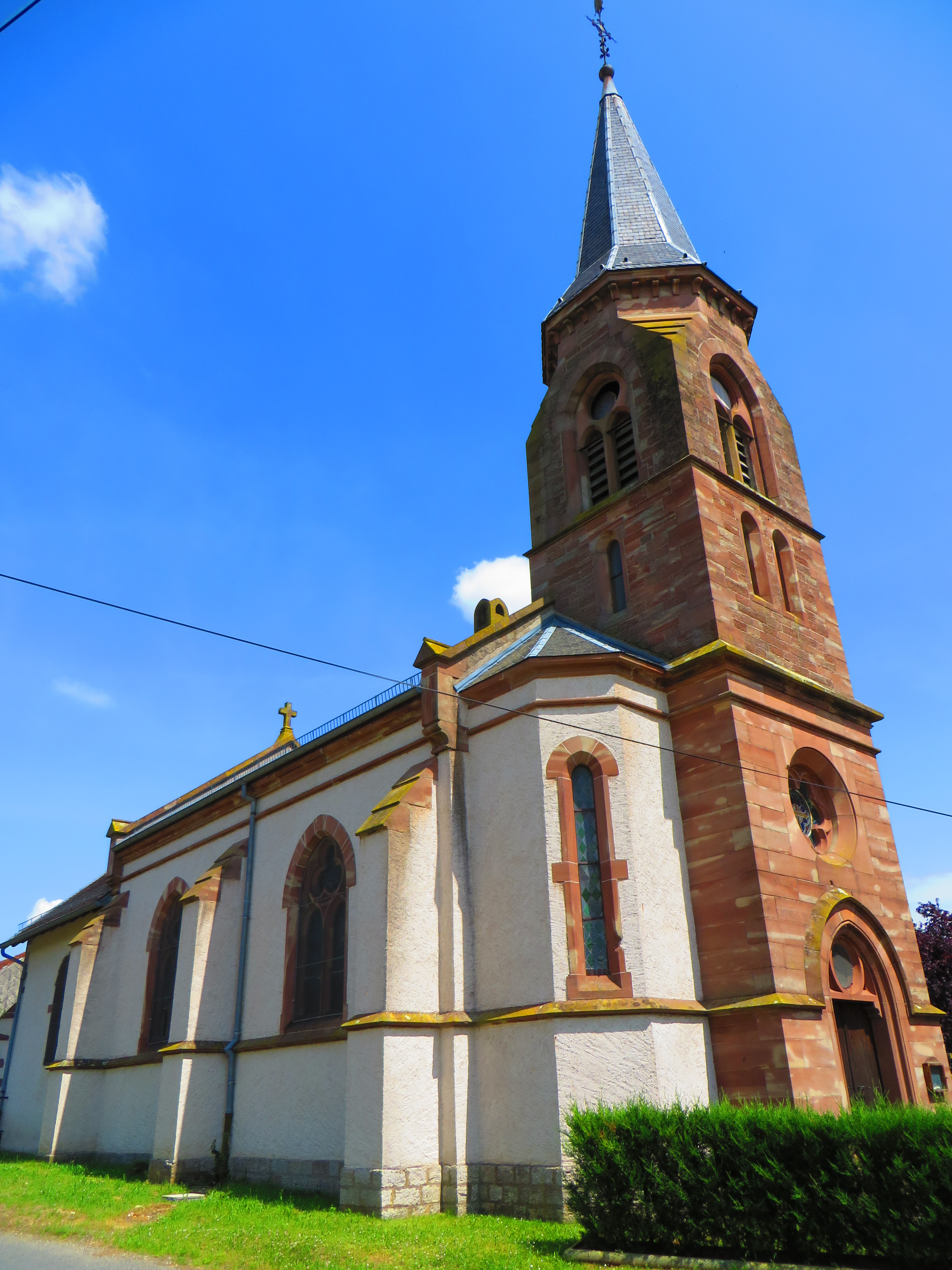
- The church in Aspach

- Coat of arms
- Location of Aspach
- Location within France Location within Grand Est
- Coordinates: 48°39′18″N 6°57′46″E
- Country: France
- Region: Grand Est
- Department: Moselle
- Arrondissement: Sarrebourg-Château-Salins
- Canton: Phalsbourg
- Intercommunality: CC Sarrebourg - Moselle Sud

Government
  - Mayor (2020–2026): Alain Genin
- Area^{1}: 4.13 km^{2} (1.59 sq mi)
- Highest elevation: 355 m (1,165 ft)
- Lowest elevation: 283 m (928 ft)
- Population (2023): 40
  - Density: 9.7/km^{2} (25/sq mi)
- Time zone: UTC+01:00 (CET)
  - Summer (DST): UTC+02:00 (CEST)
- INSEE/Postal code: 57034 /57790
- ^{1} French Land Register data, which excludes lakes, ponds, glaciers > 1 km^{2} (0.386 sq mi or 247 acres) and river estuaries.

Aspach (German: Aspach) is a commune in the Moselle department in Grand Est in northeastern France.

== Population ==
Historical population
Year	Pop.	±% p.a.
1968	60	—
1975	58	−0.48%
1982	49	−2.38%
1990	41	−2.20%
1999	36	−1.43%
2007	43	+2.25%
2012	39	−1.93%
2017	34	−2.71%
2023	40	+2.75%
Source: INSEE

== See also ==
- Communes of the Moselle department
