= Plaine-de-Walsch =

- Commune
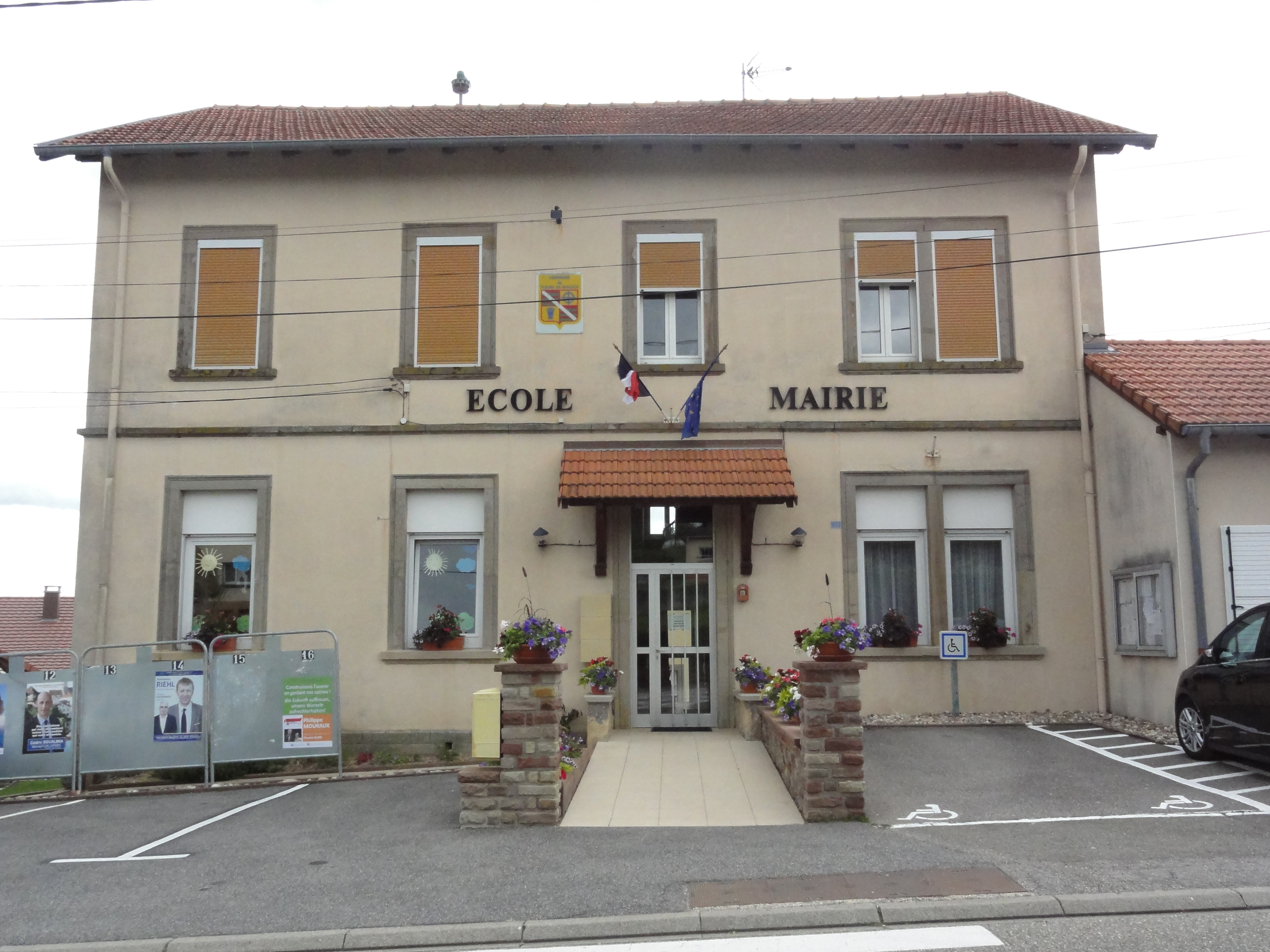
- The town hall and school in Plaine-de-Walsch

- Coat of arms
- Location of Plaine-de-Walsch
- Location within France Location within Grand Est
- Coordinates: 48°41′29″N 7°06′58″E
- Country: France
- Region: Grand Est
- Department: Moselle
- Arrondissement: Sarrebourg-Château-Salins
- Canton: Phalsbourg
- Intercommunality: CC Sarrebourg Moselle Sud

Government
  - Mayor (2020–2026): Didier Lerch
- Area^{1}: 4.98 km^{2} (1.92 sq mi)
- Elevation: 360 m (1,180 ft)
- Highest elevation: 414 m (1,358 ft)
- Lowest elevation: 238 m (781 ft)
- Population (2023): 601
  - Density: 121/km^{2} (313/sq mi)
- Time zone: UTC+01:00 (CET)
  - Summer (DST): UTC+02:00 (CEST)
- INSEE/Postal code: 57544 /57870
- ^{1} French Land Register data, which excludes lakes, ponds, glaciers > 1 km^{2} (0.386 sq mi or 247 acres) and river estuaries.

Plaine-de-Walsch (French pronunciation: [plɛn də valʃ]; German: Hochwalsch) is a commune in the Moselle department in Grand Est in north-eastern France.

== See also ==
- Communes of the Moselle department
