= Landange =

- Commune
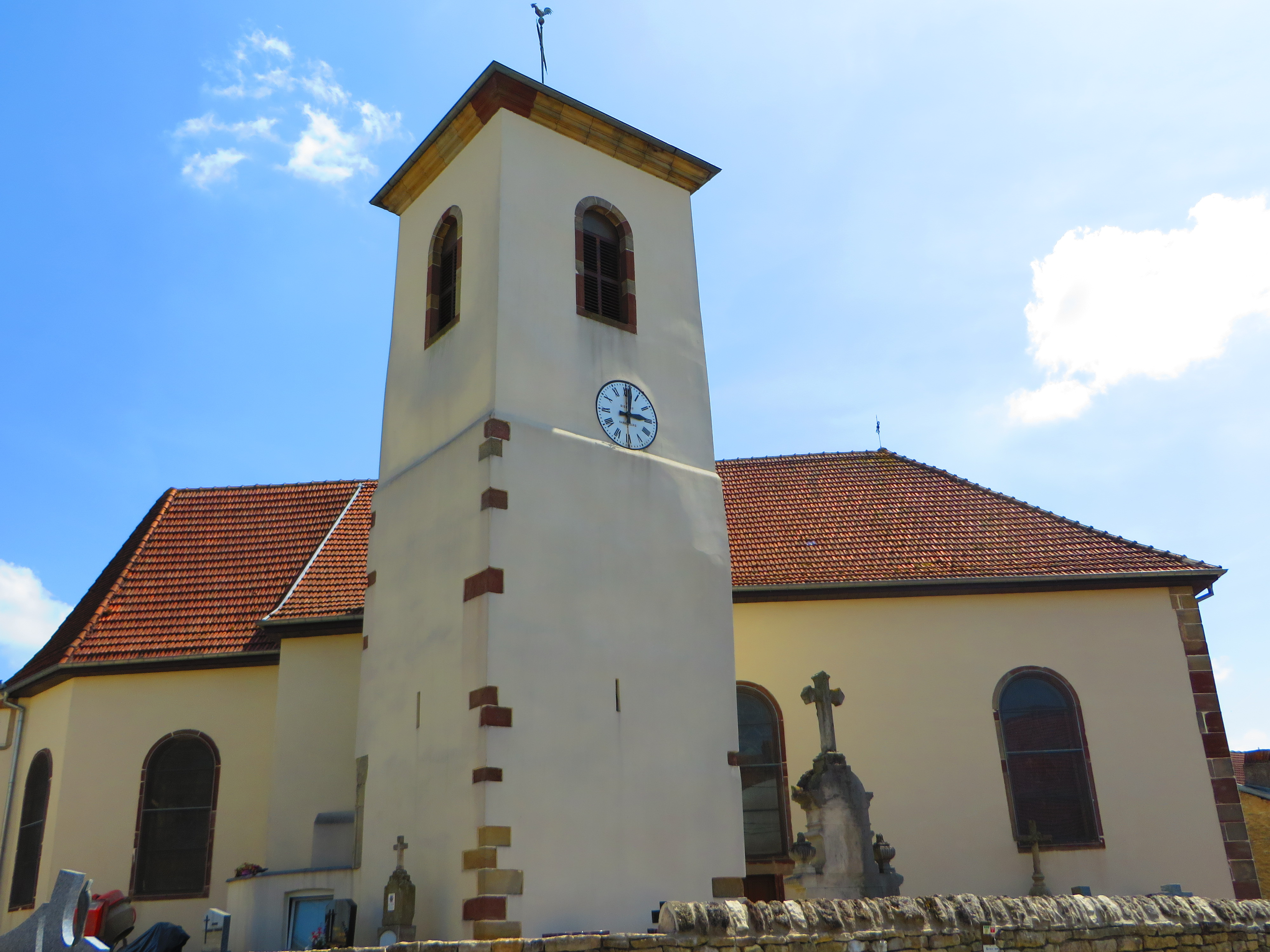
- The church in Landange

- Coat of arms
- Location of Landange
- Location within France Location within Grand Est
- Coordinates: 48°40′18″N 6°57′34″E
- Country: France
- Region: Grand Est
- Department: Moselle
- Arrondissement: Sarrebourg-Château-Salins
- Canton: Phalsbourg
- Intercommunality: Sarrebourg - Moselle Sud

Government
  - Mayor (2020–2026): René Bour
- Area^{1}: 4.85 km^{2} (1.87 sq mi)
- Highest elevation: 343 m (1,125 ft)
- Lowest elevation: 269 m (883 ft)
- Population (2023): 239
  - Density: 49.3/km^{2} (128/sq mi)
- Time zone: UTC+01:00 (CET)
  - Summer (DST): UTC+02:00 (CEST)
- INSEE/Postal code: 57377 /57830
- ^{1} French Land Register data, which excludes lakes, ponds, glaciers > 1 km^{2} (0.386 sq mi or 247 acres) and river estuaries.

Landange (French pronunciation: [lɑ̃dɑ̃ʒ]; Lorrain: Landonche; German: Landingen) is a commune in the Moselle department in Grand Est in north-eastern France.

== See also ==
- Communes of the Moselle department
