= Laneuveville-lès-Lorquin =

- Commune
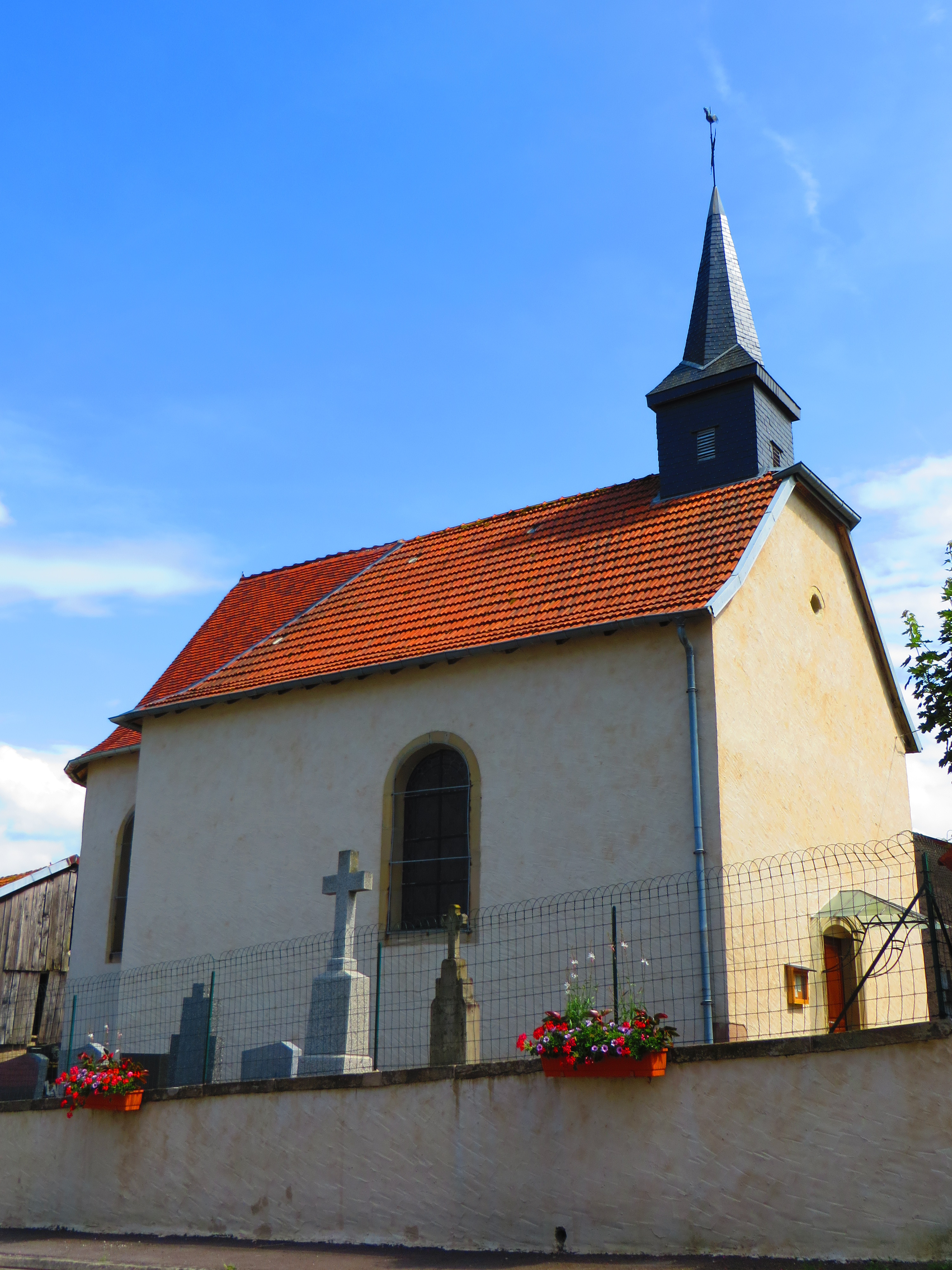
- The church in Laneuveville-lès-Lorquin

- Coat of arms
- Location of Laneuveville-lès-Lorquin
- Location within France Location within Grand Est
- Coordinates: 48°39′15″N 7°00′10″E
- Country: France
- Region: Grand Est
- Department: Moselle
- Arrondissement: Sarrebourg-Château-Salins
- Canton: Phalsbourg
- Intercommunality: Sarrebourg - Moselle Sud

Government
  - Mayor (2020–2026): Jacky Weber
- Area^{1}: 2.24 km^{2} (0.86 sq mi)
- Highest elevation: 354 m (1,161 ft)
- Lowest elevation: 267 m (876 ft)
- Population (2023): 104
  - Density: 46.4/km^{2} (120/sq mi)
- Time zone: UTC+01:00 (CET)
  - Summer (DST): UTC+02:00 (CEST)
- INSEE/Postal code: 57380 /57790
- ^{1} French Land Register data, which excludes lakes, ponds, glaciers > 1 km^{2} (0.386 sq mi or 247 acres) and river estuaries.

Laneuveville-lès-Lorquin (French pronunciation: [lanœvvil lɛ lɔʁkɛ̃], literally Laneuveville near Lorquin; German: Neuendorf bei Lörchingen) is a commune in the Moselle department in Grand Est in north-eastern France.

== See also ==
- Communes of the Moselle department
