= Berling, Moselle =

Berling
- Commune
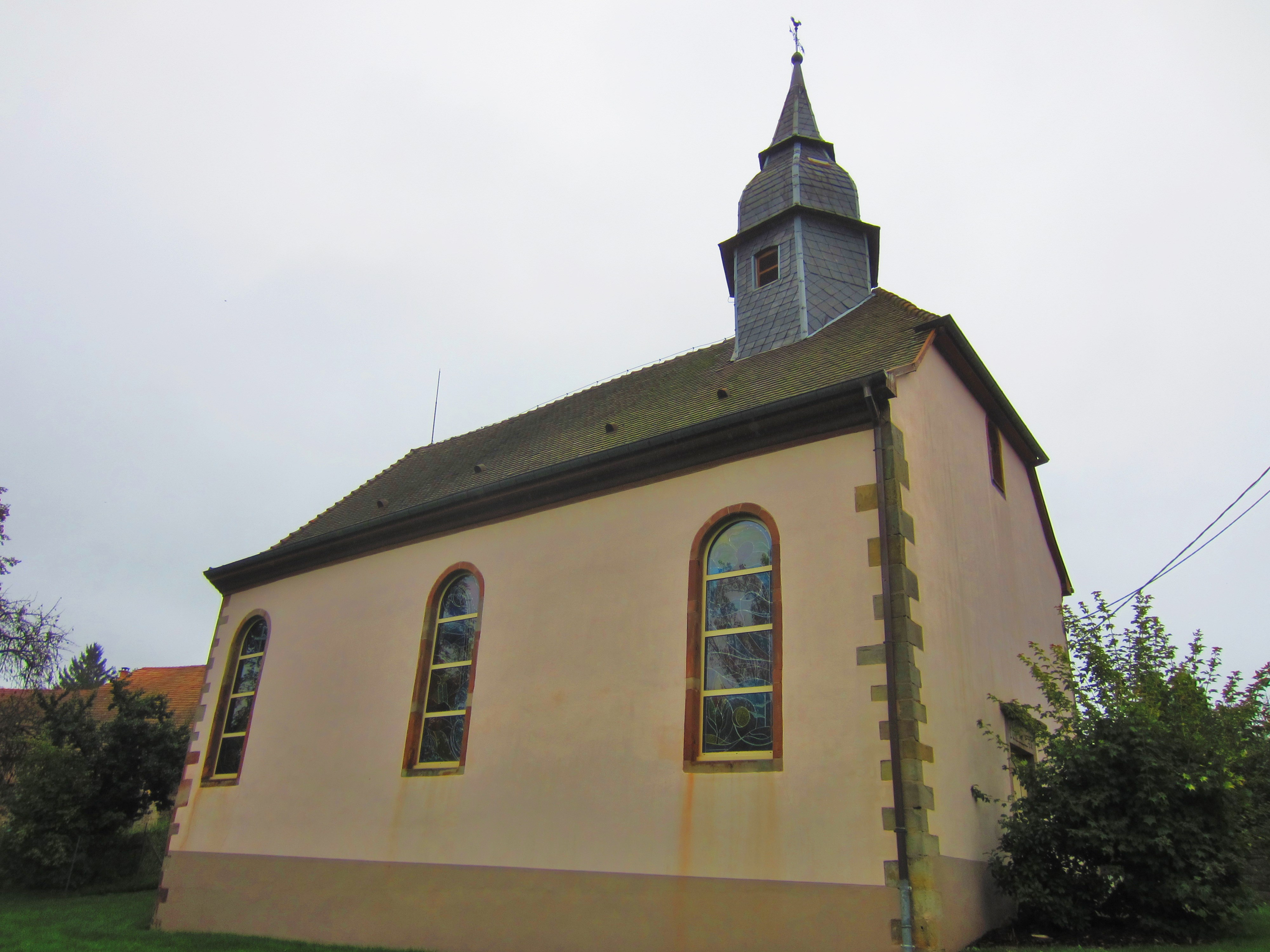
- The Lutheran church in Berling

- Coat of arms
- Location of Berling
- Location within France Location within Grand Est
- Coordinates: 48°48′06″N 7°14′33″E
- Country: France
- Region: Grand Est
- Department: Moselle
- Arrondissement: Sarrebourg-Château-Salins
- Canton: Phalsbourg
- Intercommunality: Pays de Phalsbourg

Government
  - Mayor (2020–2026): Ernest Hamm
- Area^{1}: 3.15 km^{2} (1.22 sq mi)
- Elevation: 200 m (660 ft)
- Highest elevation: 308 m (1,010 ft)
- Lowest elevation: 220 m (720 ft)
- Population (2023): 313
  - Density: 99.4/km^{2} (257/sq mi)
- Time zone: UTC+01:00 (CET)
  - Summer (DST): UTC+02:00 (CEST)
- INSEE/Postal code: 57064 /57370
- ^{1} French Land Register data, which excludes lakes, ponds, glaciers > 1 km^{2} (0.386 sq mi or 247 acres) and river estuaries.

Berling (French pronunciation: [bɛʁlɛ̃]; German: Berlingen) is a commune in the Moselle department in Grand Est in northeastern France.

== Population ==
Historical population
Year	Pop.	±% p.a.
1968	215	—
1975	238	+1.46%
1982	246	+0.47%
1990	243	−0.15%
1999	249	+0.27%
2007	290	+1.92%
2012	289	−0.07%
2017	270	−1.35%
2023	313	+2.49%
Source: INSEE

== See also ==
- Communes of the Moselle department
