= Métairies-Saint-Quirin =

- Commune
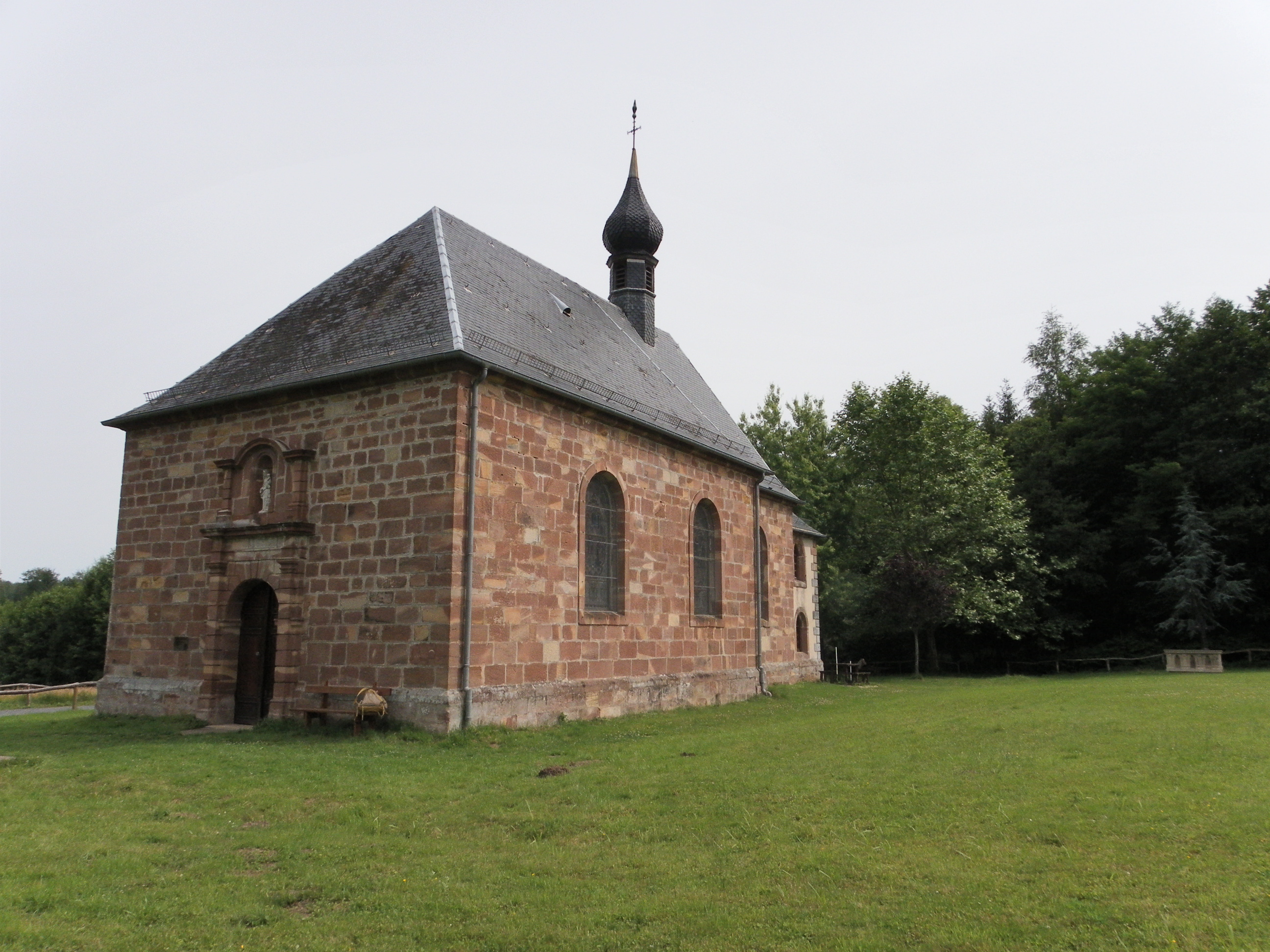
- The chapel in Métairies-Saint-Quirin

- Coat of arms
- Location of Métairies-Saint-Quirin
- Location within France Location within Grand Est
- Coordinates: 48°39′12″N 7°02′34″E
- Country: France
- Region: Grand Est
- Department: Moselle
- Arrondissement: Sarrebourg-Château-Salins
- Canton: Phalsbourg
- Intercommunality: Sarrebourg - Moselle Sud

Government
  - Mayor (2020–2026): Marie-Rose Appel
- Area^{1}: 9.57 km^{2} (3.69 sq mi)
- Highest elevation: 385 m (1,263 ft)
- Lowest elevation: 267 m (876 ft)
- Population (2023): 271
  - Density: 28.3/km^{2} (73.3/sq mi)
- Time zone: UTC+01:00 (CET)
  - Summer (DST): UTC+02:00 (CEST)
- INSEE/Postal code: 57461 /57560
- ^{1} French Land Register data, which excludes lakes, ponds, glaciers > 1 km^{2} (0.386 sq mi or 247 acres) and river estuaries.

Métairies-Saint-Quirin (French pronunciation: [metɛʁi sɛ̃ kiʁɛ̃]; German: Quirinsweiler) is a commune in the Moselle department in Grand Est in north-eastern France.

== See also ==
- Communes of the Moselle department
