= Vilsberg =

- Commune
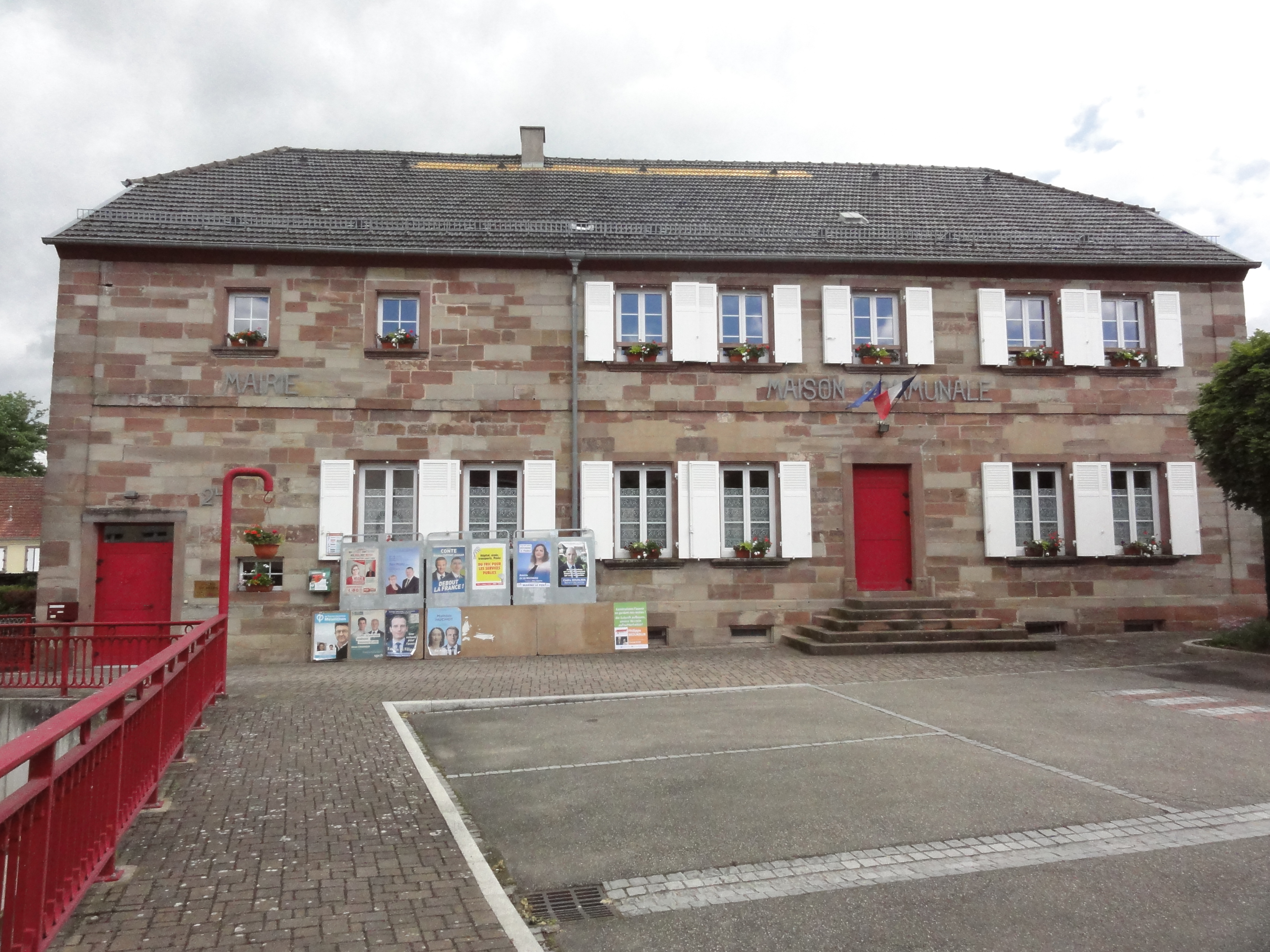
- The town hall in Vilsberg

- Coat of arms
- Location of Vilsberg
- Location within France Location within Grand Est
- Coordinates: 48°47′13″N 7°15′19″E
- Country: France
- Region: Grand Est
- Department: Moselle
- Arrondissement: Sarrebourg-Château-Salins
- Canton: Phalsbourg

Government
  - Mayor (2020–2026): Roland Gross
- Area^{1}: 5 km^{2} (1.9 sq mi)
- Elevation: 273 m (896 ft)
- Highest elevation: 316 m (1,037 ft)
- Lowest elevation: 200 m (660 ft)
- Population (2023): 348
  - Density: 70/km^{2} (180/sq mi)
- Time zone: UTC+01:00 (CET)
  - Summer (DST): UTC+02:00 (CEST)
- INSEE/Postal code: 57721 /57370
- ^{1} French Land Register data, which excludes lakes, ponds, glaciers > 1 km^{2} (0.386 sq mi or 247 acres) and river estuaries.

Vilsberg (French pronunciation: [vilsbɛʁɡ]; German: Wilsberg) is a commune in the Moselle department in Grand Est in north-eastern France.

== See also ==
- Communes of the Moselle department
