= Fraquelfing =

- Commune
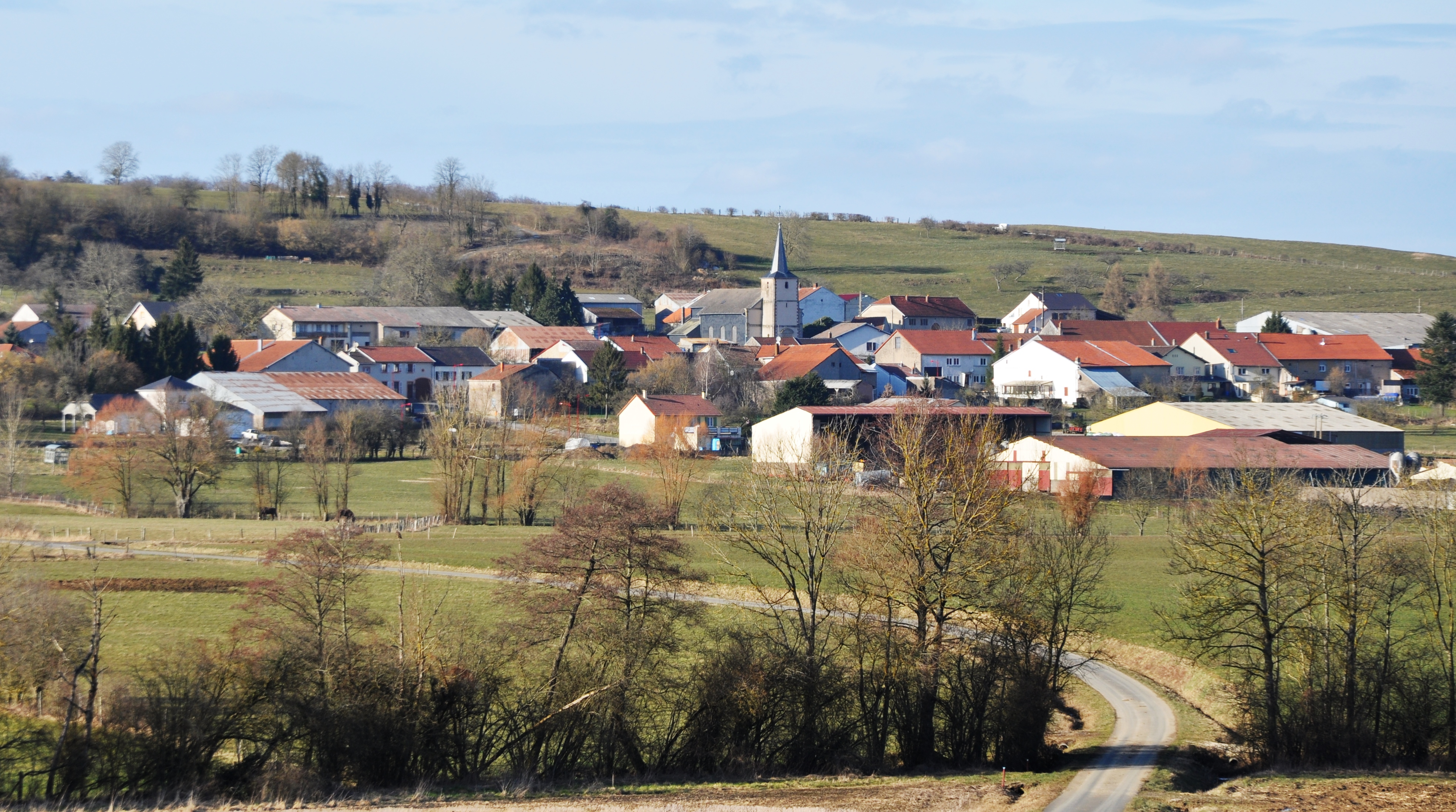
- A general view of Fraquelfing

- Coat of arms
- Location of Fraquelfing
- Location within France Location within Grand Est
- Coordinates: 48°38′25″N 6°59′22″E
- Country: France
- Region: Grand Est
- Department: Moselle
- Arrondissement: Sarrebourg-Château-Salins
- Canton: Phalsbourg
- Intercommunality: Sarrebourg - Moselle Sud

Government
  - Mayor (2020–2026): Florian Gauthier
- Area^{1}: 4.44 km^{2} (1.71 sq mi)
- Highest elevation: 374 m (1,227 ft)
- Lowest elevation: 282 m (925 ft)
- Population (2023): 82
  - Density: 18/km^{2} (48/sq mi)
- Time zone: UTC+01:00 (CET)
  - Summer (DST): UTC+02:00 (CEST)
- INSEE/Postal code: 57233 /57790
- ^{1} French Land Register data, which excludes lakes, ponds, glaciers > 1 km^{2} (0.386 sq mi or 247 acres) and river estuaries.

Fraquelfing (French pronunciation: [fʁakɛlfɛ̃]; German: Frackelfingen) is a commune in the Moselle department in Grand Est in north-eastern France.

== See also ==
- Communes of the Moselle department
