= Dannelbourg =

- Commune
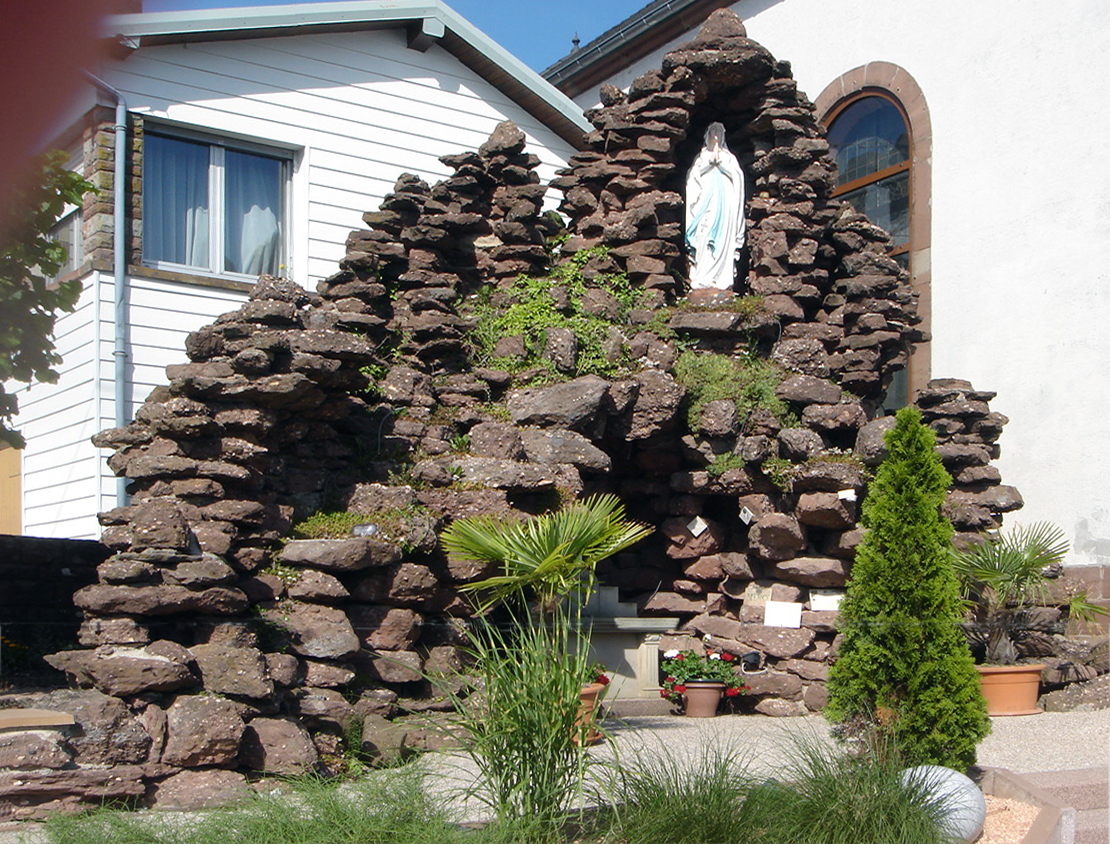
- A replica of the Grotto of Lourdes, in Dannelbourg

- Coat of arms
- Location of Dannelbourg
- Location within France Location within Grand Est
- Coordinates: 48°44′38″N 7°14′10″E
- Country: France
- Region: Grand Est
- Department: Moselle
- Arrondissement: Sarrebourg-Château-Salins
- Canton: Phalsbourg
- Intercommunality: Pays de Phalsbourg

Government
  - Mayor (2020–2026): Pierre Martin
- Area^{1}: 2.95 km^{2} (1.14 sq mi)
- Elevation: 305 m (1,001 ft)
- Highest elevation: 362 m (1,188 ft)
- Lowest elevation: 219 m (719 ft)
- Population (2023): 505
  - Density: 171/km^{2} (443/sq mi)
- Time zone: UTC+01:00 (CET)
  - Summer (DST): UTC+02:00 (CEST)
- INSEE/Postal code: 57169 /57820
- ^{1} French Land Register data, which excludes lakes, ponds, glaciers > 1 km^{2} (0.386 sq mi or 247 acres) and river estuaries.

Dannelbourg (French pronunciation: [danɛlbuʁ]; German: Dannelburg) is a commune in the Moselle department in Grand Est in north-eastern France.

== History ==
The commune was part of the principality of Phalsbourg and Lixheim. It was ceded to France in 1661 in accordance with the Treaty of Vincennes.

Dannelbourg was integrated into Alsace-Lorraine following the French defeat in the Franco-Prussian War of 1870, then returned to France following the First World War in 1918.

== Historical, cultural and architectural heritage ==
Gallo-Roman remains are observable in the village.

The church Saint-Jean-Baptiste, built during the 19th century. It houses an old organ from the basilica Saint-Epvre in Nancy.

== See also ==
- Communes of the Moselle department
