= Voyer, Moselle =

Voyer
- Commune
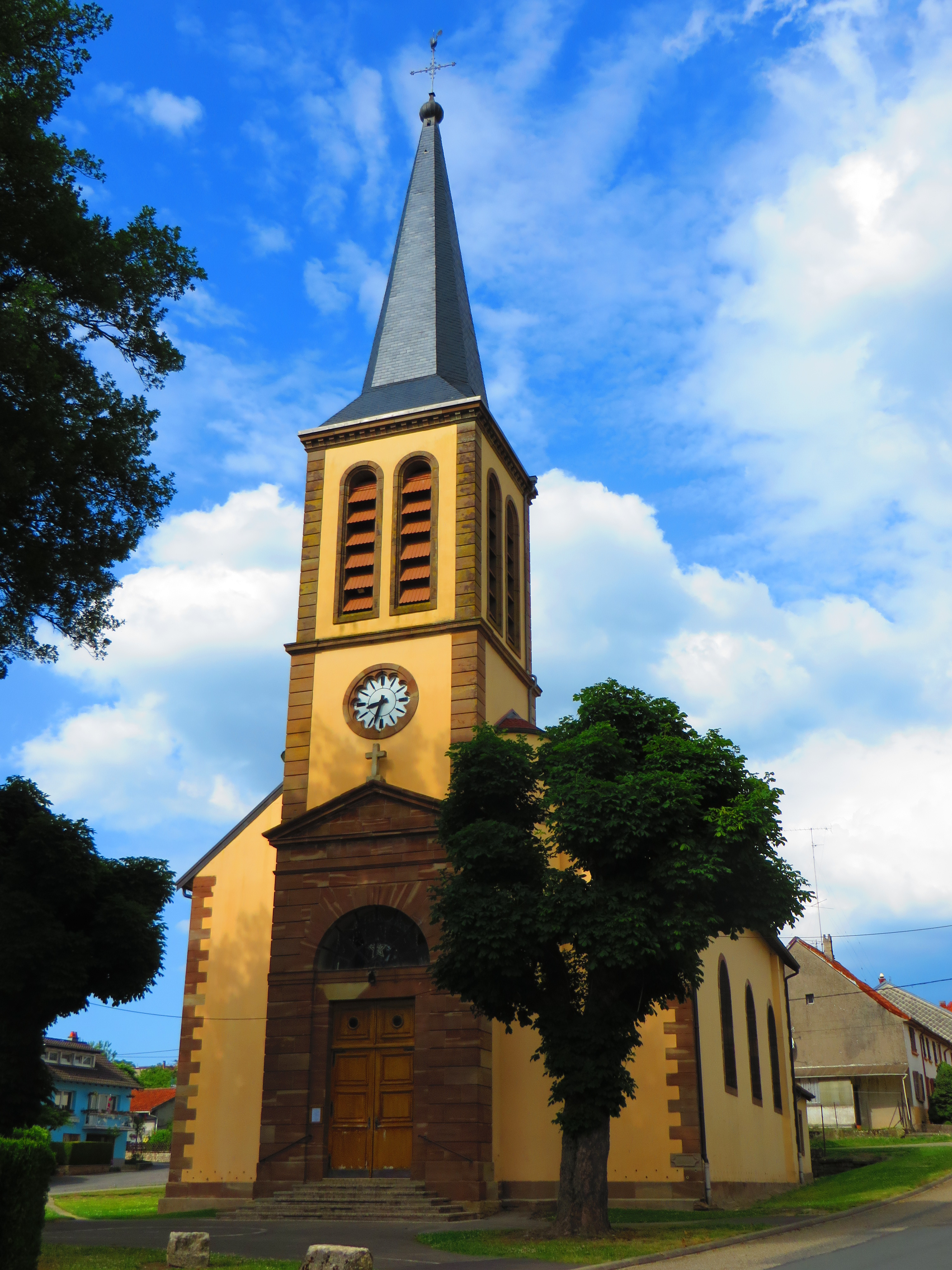
- The church in Voyer

- Coat of arms
- Location of Voyer
- Location within France Location within Grand Est
- Coordinates: 48°39′11″N 7°04′50″E
- Country: France
- Region: Grand Est
- Department: Moselle
- Arrondissement: Sarrebourg-Château-Salins
- Canton: Phalsbourg
- Intercommunality: Sarrebourg-Moselle Sud

Government
  - Mayor (2020–2026): Bertrand Janson
- Area^{1}: 4.48 km^{2} (1.73 sq mi)
- Elevation: 289 m (948 ft)
- Highest elevation: 440 m (1,440 ft)
- Lowest elevation: 282 m (925 ft)
- Population (2023): 445
  - Density: 99.3/km^{2} (257/sq mi)
- Time zone: UTC+01:00 (CET)
  - Summer (DST): UTC+02:00 (CEST)
- INSEE/Postal code: 57734 /57560
- ^{1} French Land Register data, which excludes lakes, ponds, glaciers > 1 km^{2} (0.386 sq mi or 247 acres) and river estuaries.

Voyer (German: Weiher) is a commune in the Moselle department in Grand Est in north-eastern France.

== See also ==
- Communes of the Moselle department
