= Niderhoff =

- Commune
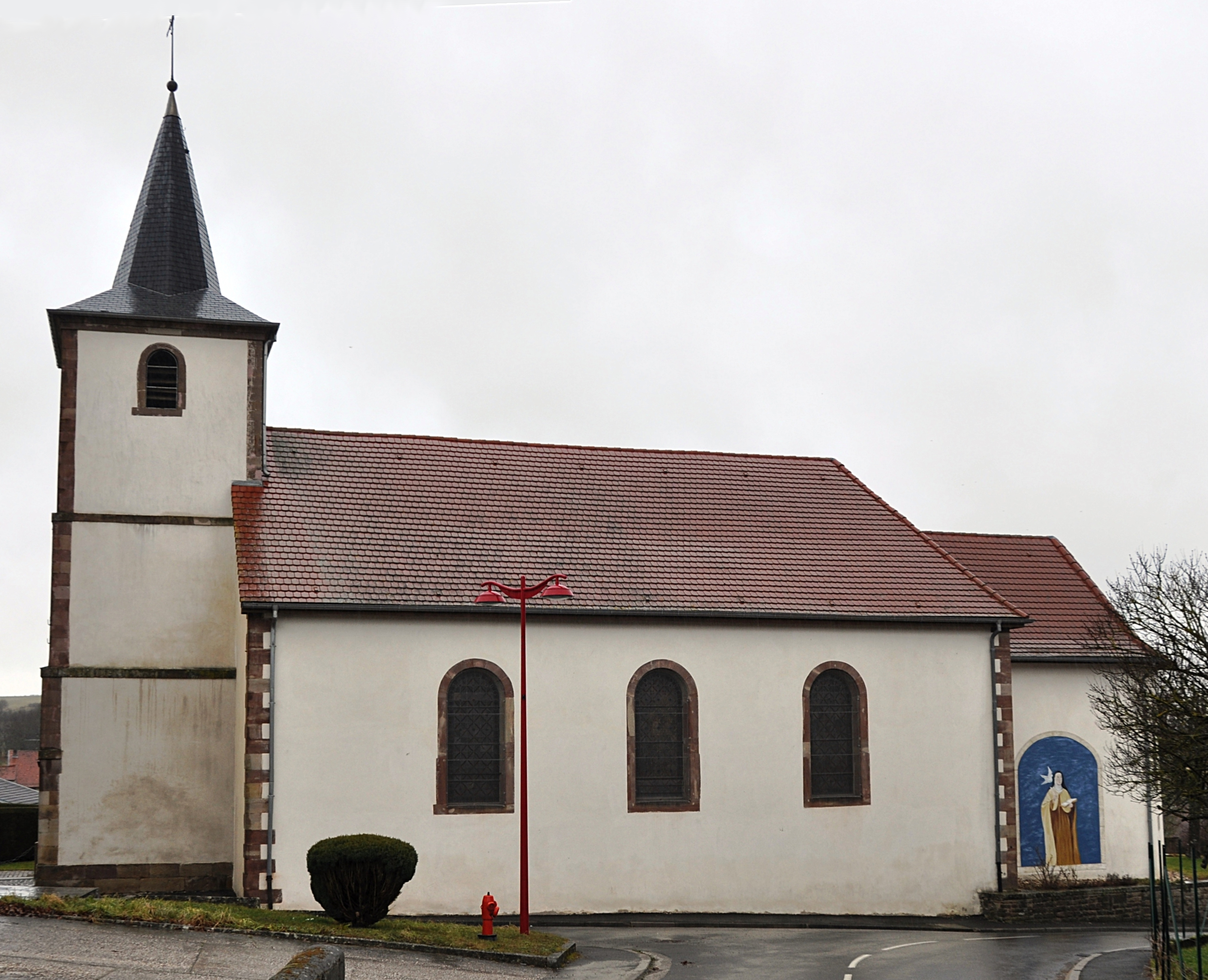
- The church in Niderhoff

- Coat of arms
- Location of Niderhoff
- Location within France Location within Grand Est
- Coordinates: 48°38′18″N 7°00′28″E
- Country: France
- Region: Grand Est
- Department: Moselle
- Arrondissement: Sarrebourg-Château-Salins
- Canton: Phalsbourg
- Intercommunality: Sarrebourg - Moselle Sud

Government
  - Mayor (2020–2026): Zénon Miziula
- Area^{1}: 5.3 km^{2} (2.0 sq mi)
- Elevation: 280 m (920 ft)
- Highest elevation: 376 m (1,234 ft)
- Lowest elevation: 272 m (892 ft)
- Population (2023): 279
  - Density: 53/km^{2} (140/sq mi)
- Time zone: UTC+01:00 (CET)
  - Summer (DST): UTC+02:00 (CEST)
- INSEE/Postal code: 57504 /57560
- ^{1} French Land Register data, which excludes lakes, ponds, glaciers > 1 km^{2} (0.386 sq mi or 247 acres) and river estuaries.

Niderhoff (French pronunciation: [nidəʁɔf]; German: Niederhof) is a commune in the Moselle department in Grand Est in north-eastern France.

== See also ==
- Communes of the Moselle department
