= Metting =

- Commune
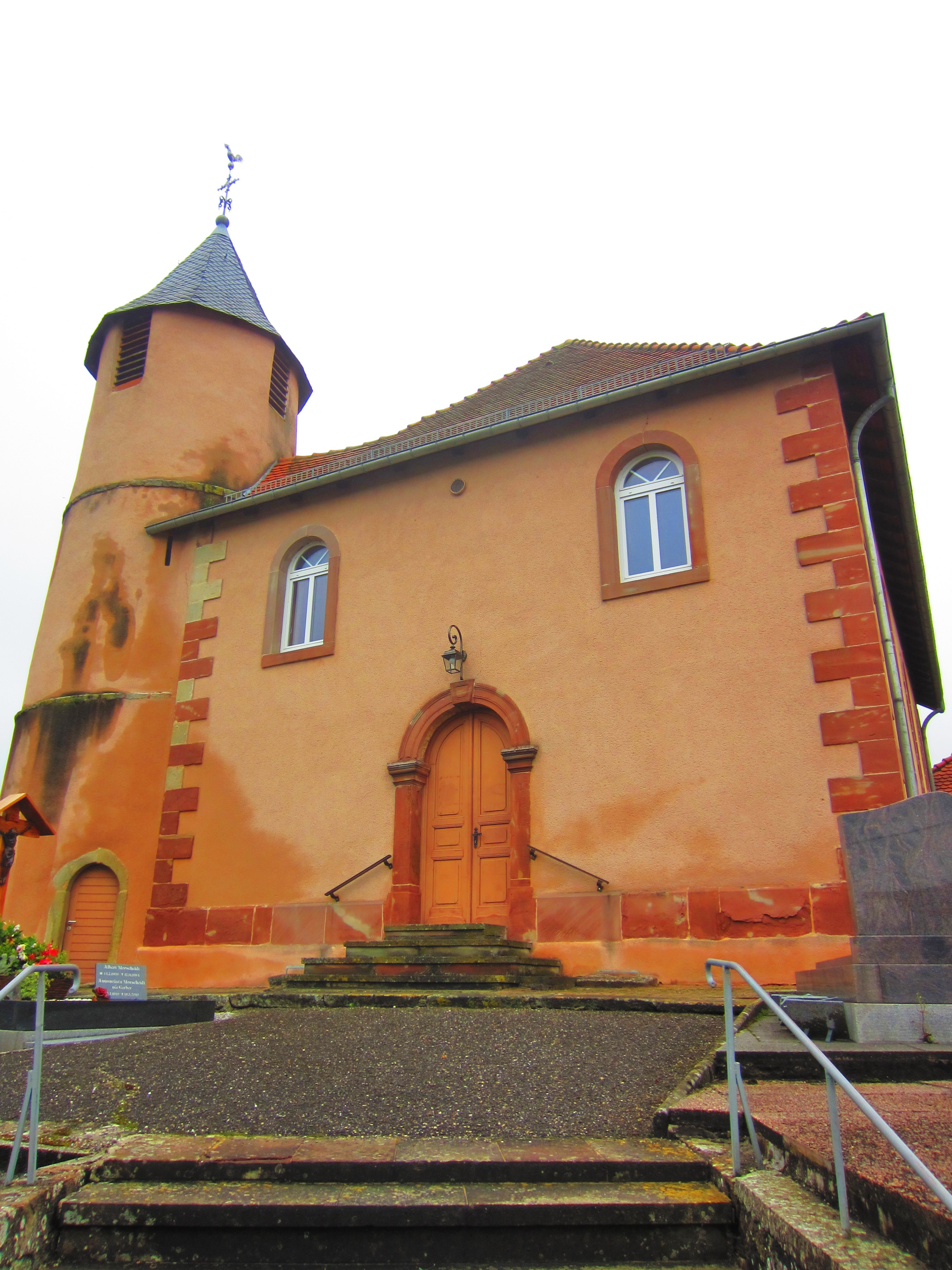
- The church in Metting

- Coat of arms
- Location of Metting
- Location within France Location within Grand Est
- Coordinates: 48°48′48″N 7°12′46″E
- Country: France
- Region: Grand Est
- Department: Moselle
- Arrondissement: Sarrebourg-Château-Salins
- Canton: Phalsbourg
- Intercommunality: Pays de Phalsbourg

Government
  - Mayor (2020–2026): Norbert Hemmerter
- Area^{1}: 5.21 km^{2} (2.01 sq mi)
- Elevation: 320 m (1,050 ft)
- Highest elevation: 316 m (1,037 ft)
- Lowest elevation: 238 m (781 ft)
- Population (2023): 410
  - Density: 79/km^{2} (200/sq mi)
- Time zone: UTC+01:00 (CET)
  - Summer (DST): UTC+02:00 (CEST)
- INSEE/Postal code: 57462 /57370
- ^{1} French Land Register data, which excludes lakes, ponds, glaciers > 1 km^{2} (0.386 sq mi or 247 acres) and river estuaries.

Metting (French pronunciation: [mɛtɛ̃]; German: Mettingen) is a commune in the Moselle department in Grand Est in north-eastern France.

== See also ==
- Communes of the Moselle department
