= Guntzviller =

- Commune
- Coat of arms
- Location of Guntzviller
- Location within France Location within Grand Est
- Coordinates: 48°42′35″N 7°09′43″E
- Country: France
- Region: Grand Est
- Department: Moselle
- Arrondissement: Sarrebourg-Château-Salins
- Canton: Phalsbourg
- Intercommunality: CC du Pays de Phalsbourg

Government
  - Mayor (2020–2026): Janique Gubelmann
- Area^{1}: 5.39 km^{2} (2.08 sq mi)
- Elevation: 340 m (1,120 ft)
- Highest elevation: 415 m (1,362 ft)
- Lowest elevation: 234 m (768 ft)
- Population (2023): 353
  - Density: 65.5/km^{2} (170/sq mi)
- Time zone: UTC+01:00 (CET)
  - Summer (DST): UTC+02:00 (CEST)
- INSEE/Postal code: 57280 /57405
- ^{1} French Land Register data, which excludes lakes, ponds, glaciers > 1 km^{2} (0.386 sq mi or 247 acres) and river estuaries.

Guntzviller (French pronunciation: [ɡuntsvilɛʁ]; German: Gunzweiler) is a commune in the Moselle department in Grand Est in north-eastern France.

== History ==
The village was part of the principality of Phalsbourg. It was first mentioned in 699 as Villa Gundvino Super Fluvio Biberacha. It was completely destroyed between 1634 and 1636 by the Swedes during the Thirty Years' War.

In October 1700, Jacques Krummenacker, a descendant of Swiss immigrants who had joined Alsace after the Peasant War, rebuilt the village by installing a glass factory and some houses there. The village became a parish during the 18th century and the glassware ceased to function before the Revolution. The village partially destroyed in 1939-1945.

== See also ==
- Communes of the Moselle department
