= Hattigny =

- Commune
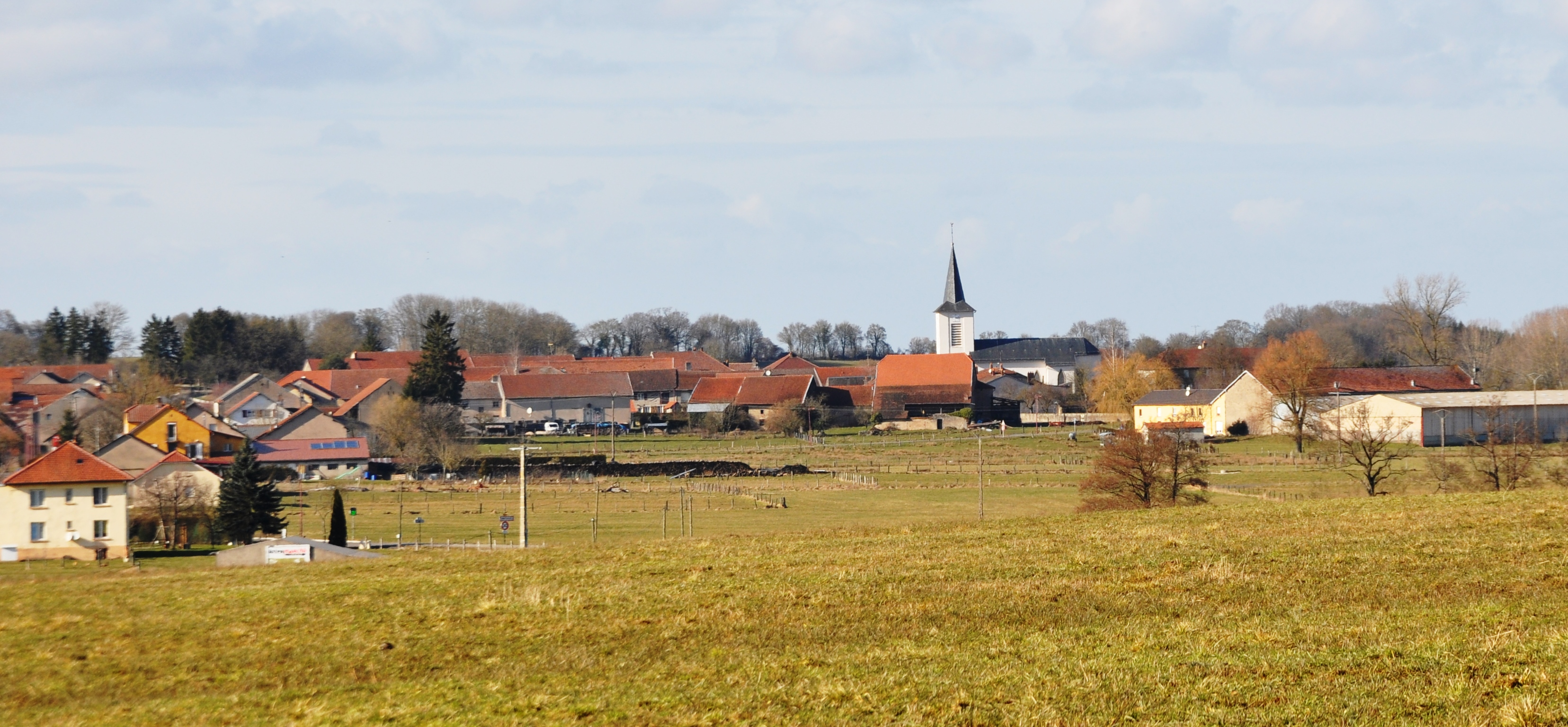
- A general view of Hattigny

- Coat of arms
- Location of Hattigny
- Location within France Location within Grand Est
- Coordinates: 48°37′56″N 6°57′57″E
- Country: France
- Region: Grand Est
- Department: Moselle
- Arrondissement: Sarrebourg-Château-Salins
- Canton: Phalsbourg
- Intercommunality: Sarrebourg - Moselle Sud

Government
  - Mayor (2020–2026): Brigitte Helluy
- Area^{1}: 13.14 km^{2} (5.07 sq mi)
- Highest elevation: 372 m (1,220 ft)
- Lowest elevation: 291 m (955 ft)
- Population (2023): 235
  - Density: 17.9/km^{2} (46.3/sq mi)
- Time zone: UTC+01:00 (CET)
  - Summer (DST): UTC+02:00 (CEST)
- INSEE/Postal code: 57302 /57790
- ^{1} French Land Register data, which excludes lakes, ponds, glaciers > 1 km^{2} (0.386 sq mi or 247 acres) and river estuaries.

Hattigny (French pronunciation: [atiɲi]; German: Hattingen) is a commune in the Moselle department in Grand Est in north-eastern France.

== See also ==
- Communes of the Moselle department
