= Lafrimbolle =

- Commune
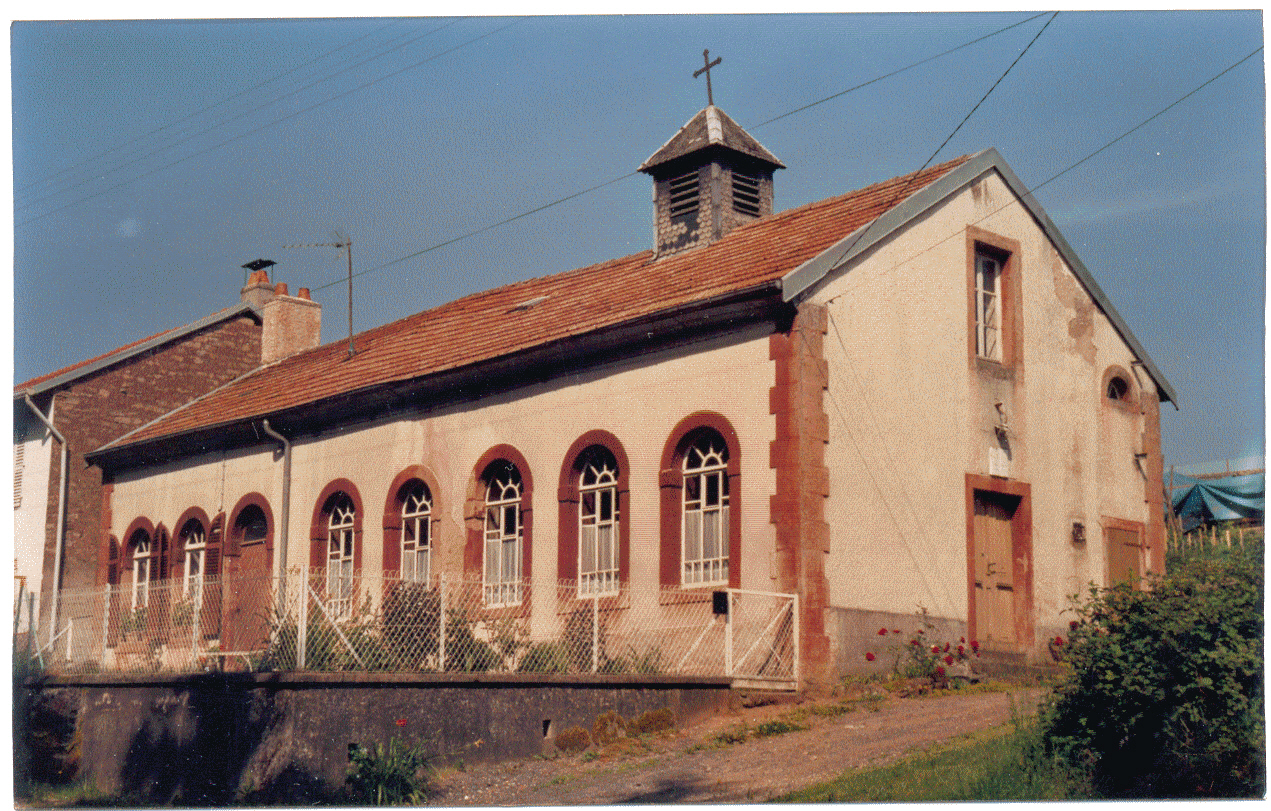
- The temple in Lafrimbolle

- Coat of arms
- Location of Lafrimbolle
- Location within France Location within Grand Est
- Coordinates: 48°35′43″N 7°01′10″E
- Country: France
- Region: Grand Est
- Department: Moselle
- Arrondissement: Sarrebourg-Château-Salins
- Canton: Phalsbourg
- Intercommunality: Sarrebourg - Moselle Sud

Government
  - Mayor (2020–2026): Chantal Etienne
- Area^{1}: 10.72 km^{2} (4.14 sq mi)
- Elevation: 350 m (1,150 ft)
- Highest elevation: 440 m (1,440 ft)
- Lowest elevation: 285 m (935 ft)
- Population (2023): 211
  - Density: 19.7/km^{2} (51.0/sq mi)
- Time zone: UTC+01:00 (CET)
  - Summer (DST): UTC+02:00 (CEST)
- INSEE/Postal code: 57374 /57560
- ^{1} French Land Register data, which excludes lakes, ponds, glaciers > 1 km^{2} (0.386 sq mi or 247 acres) and river estuaries.

Lafrimbolle (French pronunciation: [lafʁɛ̃bɔl]; German: Lassenborn) is a commune in the Moselle department in Grand Est in north-eastern France.

== See also ==
- Communes of the Moselle department
