= Haselbourg =

- Commune
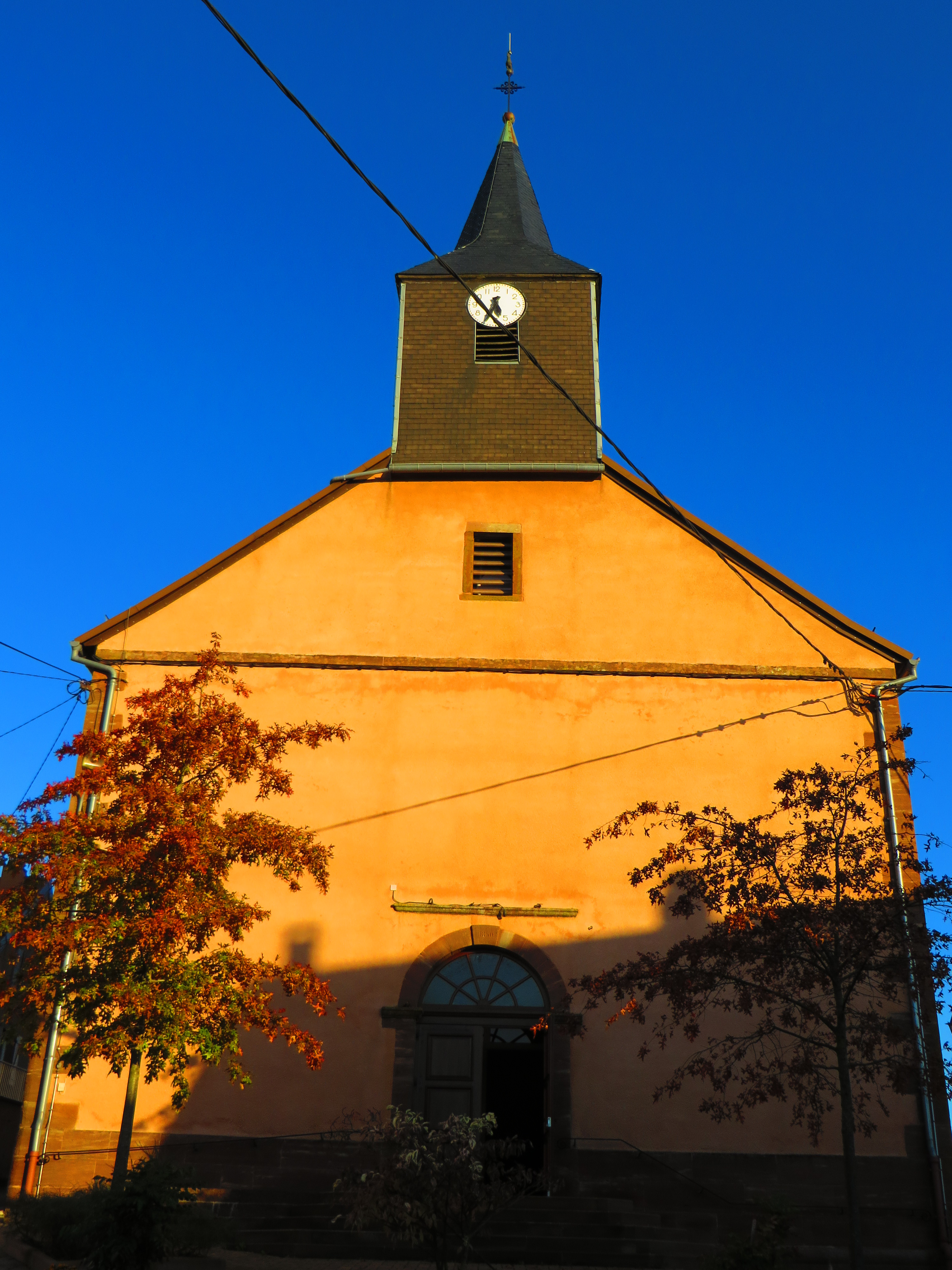
- The church in Haselbourg

- Coat of arms
- Location of Haselbourg
- Location within France Location within Grand Est
- Coordinates: 48°41′10″N 7°12′21″E
- Country: France
- Region: Grand Est
- Department: Moselle
- Arrondissement: Sarrebourg-Château-Salins
- Canton: Phalsbourg
- Intercommunality: CC du Pays de Phalsbourg

Government
  - Mayor (2020–2026): Didier Cabaillot
- Area^{1}: 6.11 km^{2} (2.36 sq mi)
- Elevation: 450 m (1,480 ft)
- Highest elevation: 501 m (1,644 ft)
- Lowest elevation: 225 m (738 ft)
- Population (2023): 295
  - Density: 48.3/km^{2} (125/sq mi)
- Time zone: UTC+01:00 (CET)
  - Summer (DST): UTC+02:00 (CEST)
- INSEE/Postal code: 57300 /57850
- ^{1} French Land Register data, which excludes lakes, ponds, glaciers > 1 km^{2} (0.386 sq mi or 247 acres) and river estuaries.

Haselbourg (German: Haselburg) is a commune in the Moselle department in Grand Est in north-eastern France.

== See also ==
- Communes of the Moselle department
