= Zilling =

- Commune
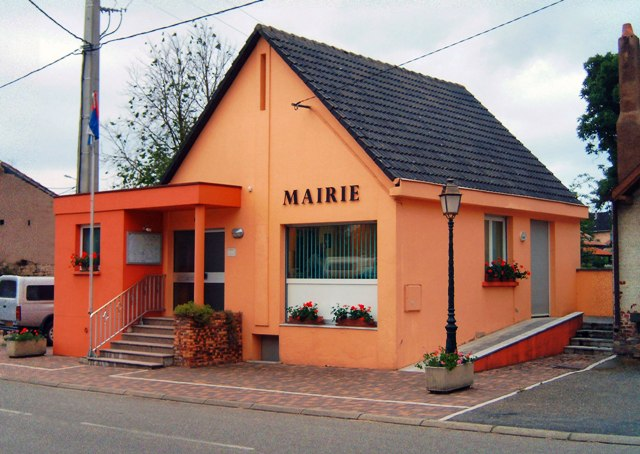
- The town hall in Zilling

- Coat of arms
- Location of Zilling
- Location within France Location within Grand Est
- Coordinates: 48°47′01″N 7°12′39″E
- Country: France
- Region: Grand Est
- Department: Moselle
- Arrondissement: Sarrebourg-Château-Salins
- Canton: Phalsbourg
- Intercommunality: Pays de Phalsbourg

Government
  - Mayor (2020–2026): Joël Muller
- Area^{1}: 3.58 km^{2} (1.38 sq mi)
- Elevation: 325 m (1,066 ft)
- Highest elevation: 304 m (997 ft)
- Lowest elevation: 238 m (781 ft)
- Population (2023): 279
  - Density: 77.9/km^{2} (202/sq mi)
- Demonym(s): Zillingeois, Zillingeoises
- Time zone: UTC+01:00 (CET)
  - Summer (DST): UTC+02:00 (CEST)
- INSEE/Postal code: 57761 /57370
- ^{1} French Land Register data, which excludes lakes, ponds, glaciers > 1 km^{2} (0.386 sq mi or 247 acres) and river estuaries.

Zilling (German: Zillingen) is a commune in the Moselle department in Grand Est in north-eastern France.

== Population ==
Historical population

Year	Pop.	±% p.a.
1793	177	—
1821	251	+1.26%
1846	317	+0.94%
1871	340	+0.28%
1900	333	−0.07%
1926	285	−0.60%
1946	260	−0.46%
1962	258	−0.05%
1968	244	−0.93%

Year	Pop.	±% p.a.
1975	240	−0.24%
1982	225	−0.92%
1990	252	+1.43%
1999	258	+0.26%
2007	257	−0.05%
2012	266	+0.69%
2017	274	+0.59%
2023	279	+0.30%

Source: EHESS (1793-1999) and INSEE

== See also ==
- Communes of the Moselle department
