= Schneckenbusch =

- Commune
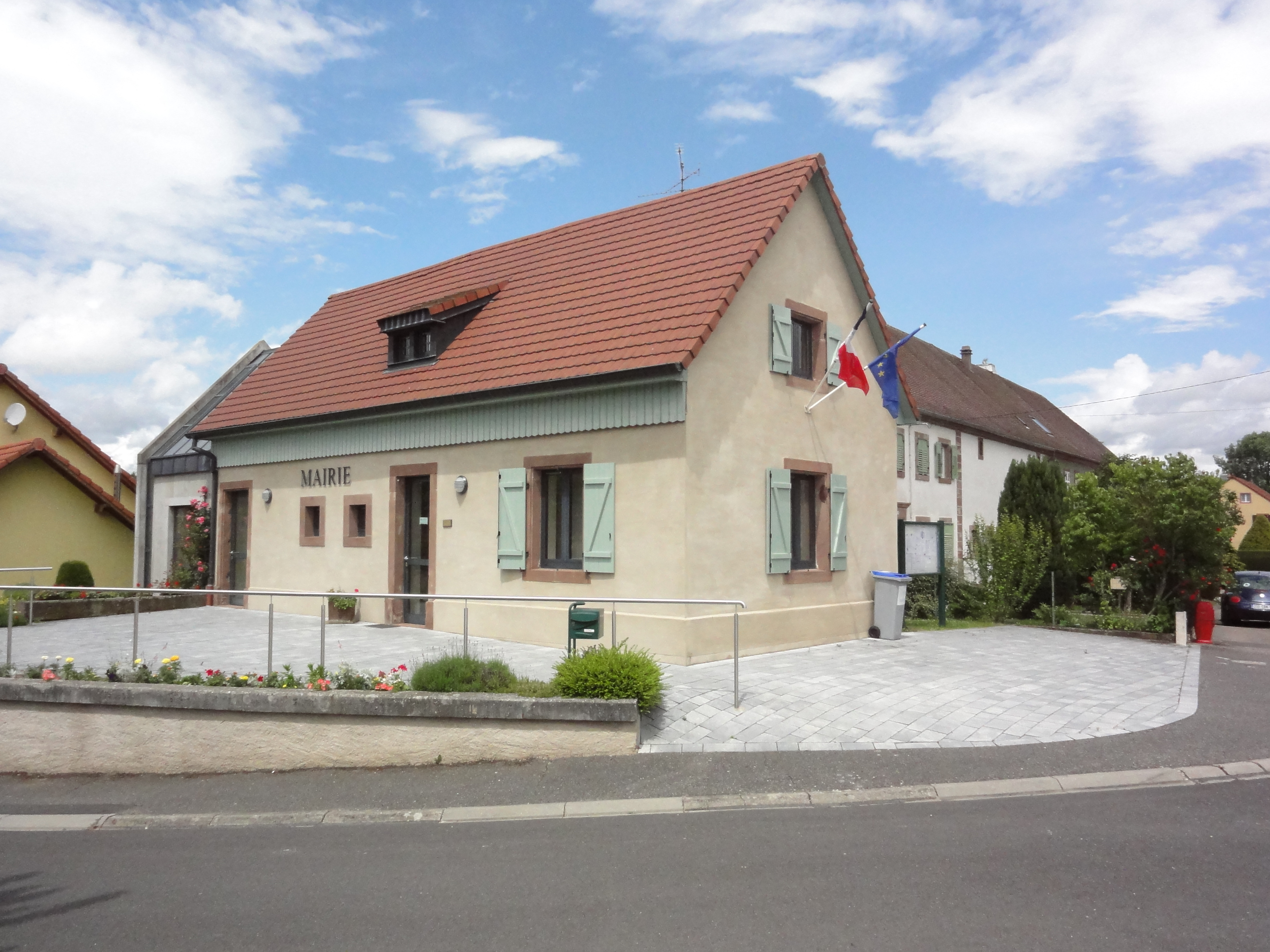
- The town hall in Schneckenbusch

- Coat of arms
- Location of Schneckenbusch
- Location within France Location within Grand Est
- Coordinates: 48°42′17″N 7°04′42″E
- Country: France
- Region: Grand Est
- Department: Moselle
- Arrondissement: Sarrebourg-Château-Salins
- Canton: Phalsbourg

Government
  - Mayor (2020–2026): Rémy Bier
- Area^{1}: 2.12 km^{2} (0.82 sq mi)
- Elevation: 280 m (920 ft)
- Highest elevation: 324 m (1,063 ft)
- Lowest elevation: 259 m (850 ft)
- Population (2023): 314
  - Density: 148/km^{2} (384/sq mi)
- Time zone: UTC+01:00 (CET)
  - Summer (DST): UTC+02:00 (CEST)
- INSEE/Postal code: 57637 /57400
- ^{1} French Land Register data, which excludes lakes, ponds, glaciers > 1 km^{2} (0.386 sq mi or 247 acres) and river estuaries.

Schneckenbusch – Schneggebesch in Rhine Franconian and Alemannic – is a commune in the Moselle department in Grand Est in north-eastern France. The word Schneckenbusch is German for "snails bush".

== Geography ==
Schneckenbusch is a little village in the south-east of Sarrebourg. The village is crossed by a little river, the Bièvre, which rises from the bottom of the Vosges Mountains. Schneckenbusch is too crossed by the Marne-Rhine Canal who opened in 1853.

The commune is situated at 47 miles from Strasbourg, 50 miles from Saarbrücken, 56 miles from Nancy and 78 miles from Metz.

== See also ==
- Communes of the Moselle department
