= Neufmoulins =

- Commune
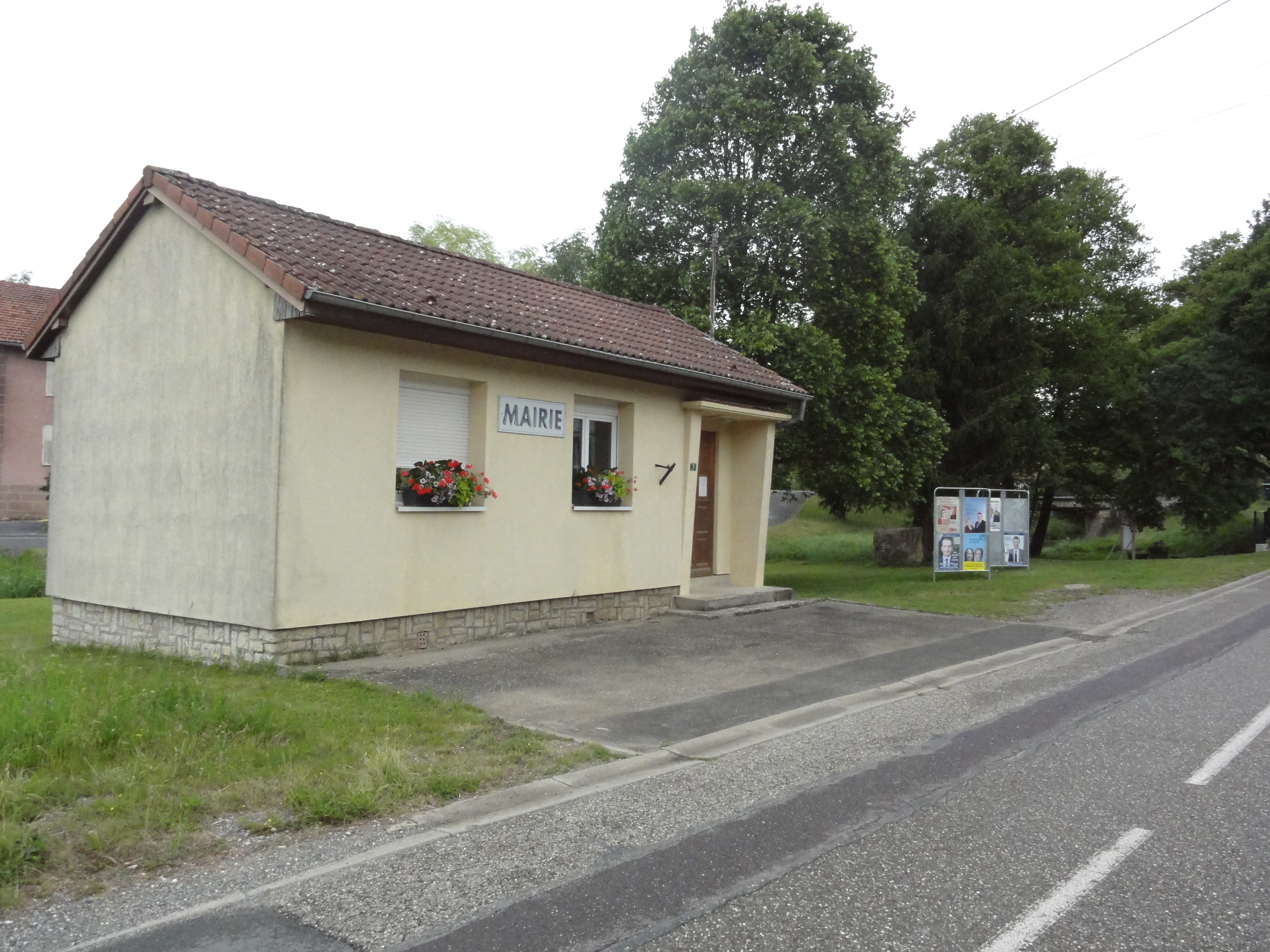
- The town hall in Neufmoulins

- Coat of arms
- Location of Neufmoulins
- Location within France Location within Grand Est
- Coordinates: 48°40′57″N 6°58′05″E
- Country: France
- Region: Grand Est
- Department: Moselle
- Arrondissement: Sarrebourg-Château-Salins
- Canton: Phalsbourg
- Intercommunality: Sarrebourg - Moselle Sud

Government
  - Mayor (2020–2026): Norbert Mangin
- Area^{1}: 1.93 km^{2} (0.75 sq mi)
- Elevation: 295 m (968 ft)
- Highest elevation: 333 m (1,093 ft)
- Lowest elevation: 265 m (869 ft)
- Population (2023): 34
  - Density: 18/km^{2} (46/sq mi)
- Time zone: UTC+01:00 (CET)
  - Summer (DST): UTC+02:00 (CEST)
- INSEE/Postal code: 57500 /57830
- ^{1} French Land Register data, which excludes lakes, ponds, glaciers > 1 km^{2} (0.386 sq mi or 247 acres) and river estuaries.

Neufmoulins (French pronunciation: [nœfmulɛ̃]; German: Neumühlen) is a commune in the Moselle department in Grand Est in north-eastern France.

== See also ==
- Communes of the Moselle department
