= Hommert =

- Commune
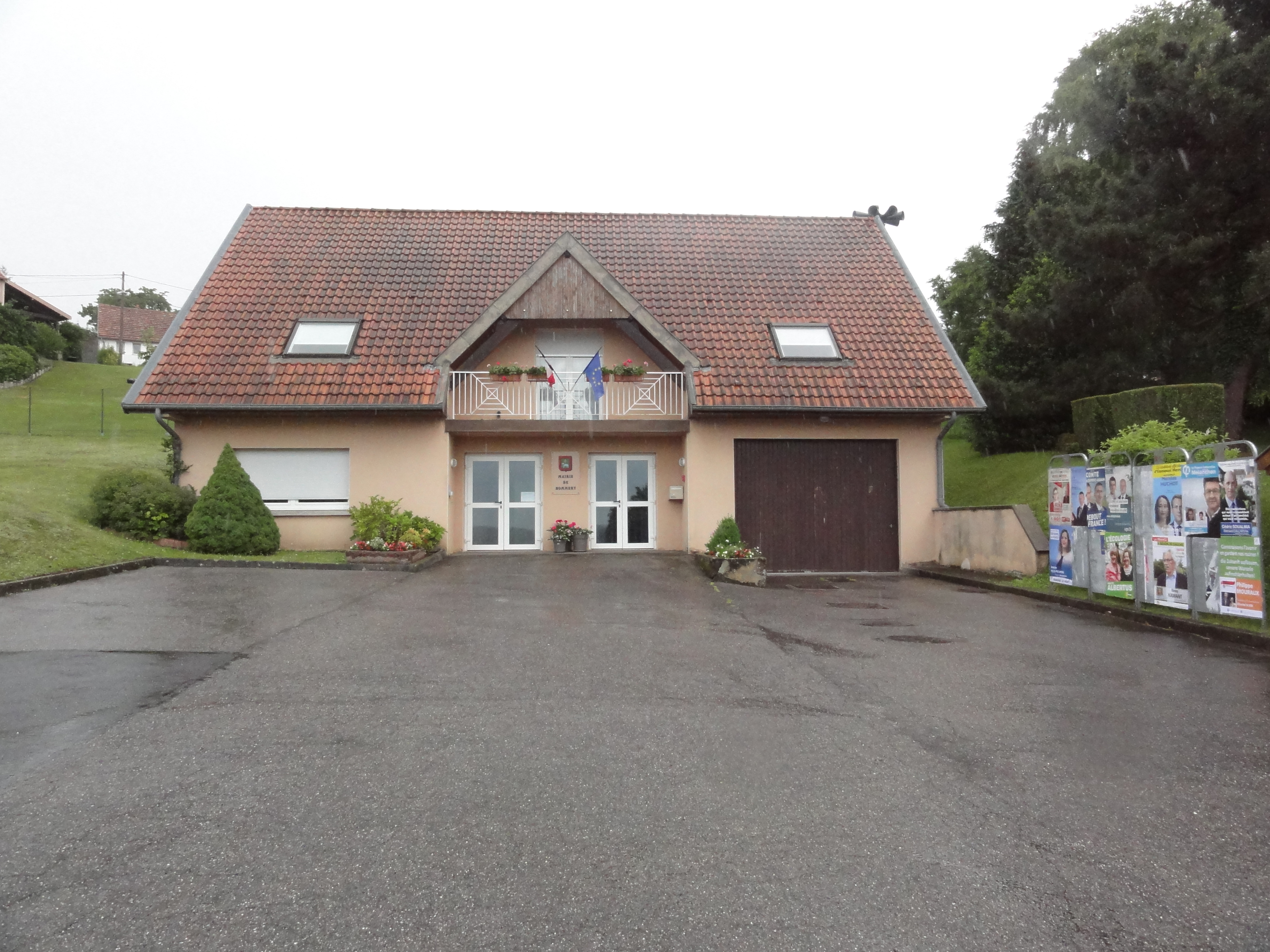
- The town hall in Hommert

- Coat of arms
- Location of Hommert
- Location within France Location within Grand Est
- Coordinates: 48°40′41″N 7°10′42″E
- Country: France
- Region: Grand Est
- Department: Moselle
- Arrondissement: Sarrebourg-Château-Salins
- Canton: Phalsbourg
- Intercommunality: CC Sarrebourg Moselle Sud

Government
  - Mayor (2020–2026): Jean-Jacques Reibel
- Area^{1}: 3.49 km^{2} (1.35 sq mi)
- Elevation: 450 m (1,480 ft)
- Highest elevation: 461 m (1,512 ft)
- Lowest elevation: 250 m (820 ft)
- Population (2023): 305
  - Density: 87.4/km^{2} (226/sq mi)
- Time zone: UTC+01:00 (CET)
  - Summer (DST): UTC+02:00 (CEST)
- INSEE/Postal code: 57334 /57870
- ^{1} French Land Register data, which excludes lakes, ponds, glaciers > 1 km^{2} (0.386 sq mi or 247 acres) and river estuaries.

Hommert (German: Hommert) is a commune in the Moselle department in Grand Est in north-eastern France.

== See also ==
- Communes of the Moselle department
