= Canton of Phalsbourg =

Coordinates: 48.77°N 7.26°E

The canton of Phalsbourg is an administrative division of the Moselle department, northeastern France. Its borders were modified at the French canton reorganisation which came into effect in March 2015. Its seat is in Phalsbourg.

It consists of the following communes:

1. Abreschviller
2. Arzviller
3. Aspach
4. Barchain
5. Berling
6. Bourscheid
7. Brouderdorff
8. Brouviller
9. Dabo
10. Danne-et-Quatre-Vents
11. Dannelbourg
12. Fraquelfing
13. Garrebourg
14. Guntzviller
15. Hangviller
16. Harreberg
17. Hartzviller
18. Haselbourg
19. Hattigny
20. Héming
21. Henridorff
22. Hérange
23. Hermelange
24. Hesse
25. Hommert
26. Hultehouse
27. Lafrimbolle
28. Landange
29. Laneuveville-lès-Lorquin
30. Lixheim
31. Lorquin
32. Lutzelbourg
33. Métairies-Saint-Quirin
34. Metting
35. Mittelbronn
36. Neufmoulins
37. Niderhoff
38. Niderviller
39. Nitting
40. Phalsbourg
41. Plaine-de-Walsch
42. Saint-Jean-Kourtzerode
43. Saint-Louis
44. Saint-Quirin
45. Schneckenbusch
46. Troisfontaines
47. Turquestein-Blancrupt
48. Vasperviller
49. Vescheim
50. Vilsberg
51. Voyer
52. Walscheid
53. Waltembourg
54. Wintersbourg
55. Xouaxange
56. Zilling
