= Mittelbronn =

- Commune
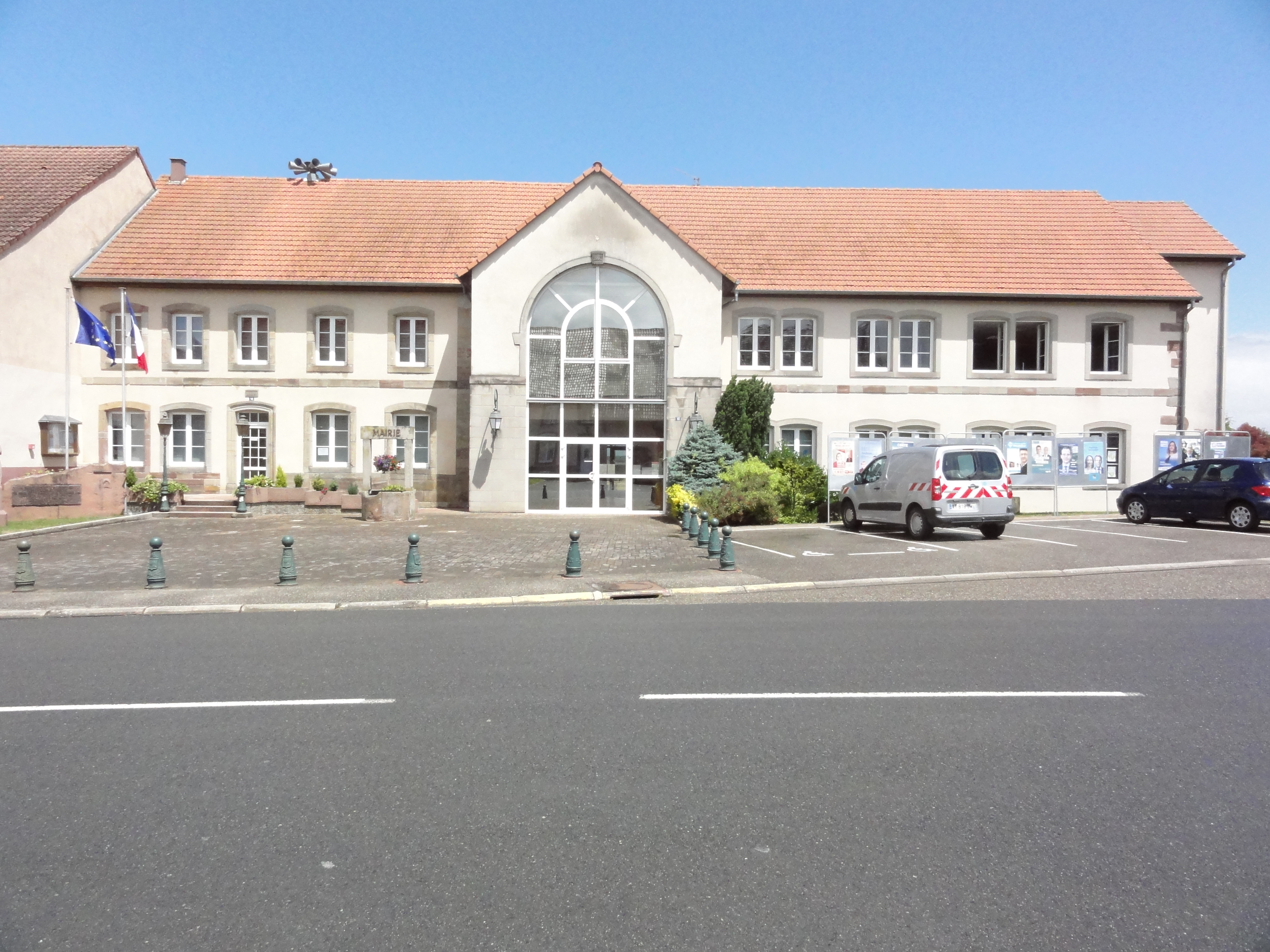
- The town hall and school in Mittelbronn

- Coat of arms
- Location of Mittelbronn
- Location within France Location within Grand Est
- Coordinates: 48°46′15″N 7°13′33″E
- Country: France
- Region: Grand Est
- Department: Moselle
- Arrondissement: Sarrebourg-Château-Salins
- Canton: Phalsbourg
- Intercommunality: Pays de Phalsbourg

Government
  - Mayor (2020–2026): Roger Berger
- Area^{1}: 7.71 km^{2} (2.98 sq mi)
- Elevation: 280 m (920 ft)
- Highest elevation: 347 m (1,138 ft)
- Lowest elevation: 249 m (817 ft)
- Population (2023): 636
  - Density: 82.5/km^{2} (214/sq mi)
- Time zone: UTC+01:00 (CET)
  - Summer (DST): UTC+02:00 (CEST)
- INSEE/Postal code: 57468 /57370
- ^{1} French Land Register data, which excludes lakes, ponds, glaciers > 1 km^{2} (0.386 sq mi or 247 acres) and river estuaries.

Mittelbronn is a commune in the Moselle department of Grand Est in north-eastern France.

== See also ==
- Communes of the Moselle department
