= Hermelange =

- Commune
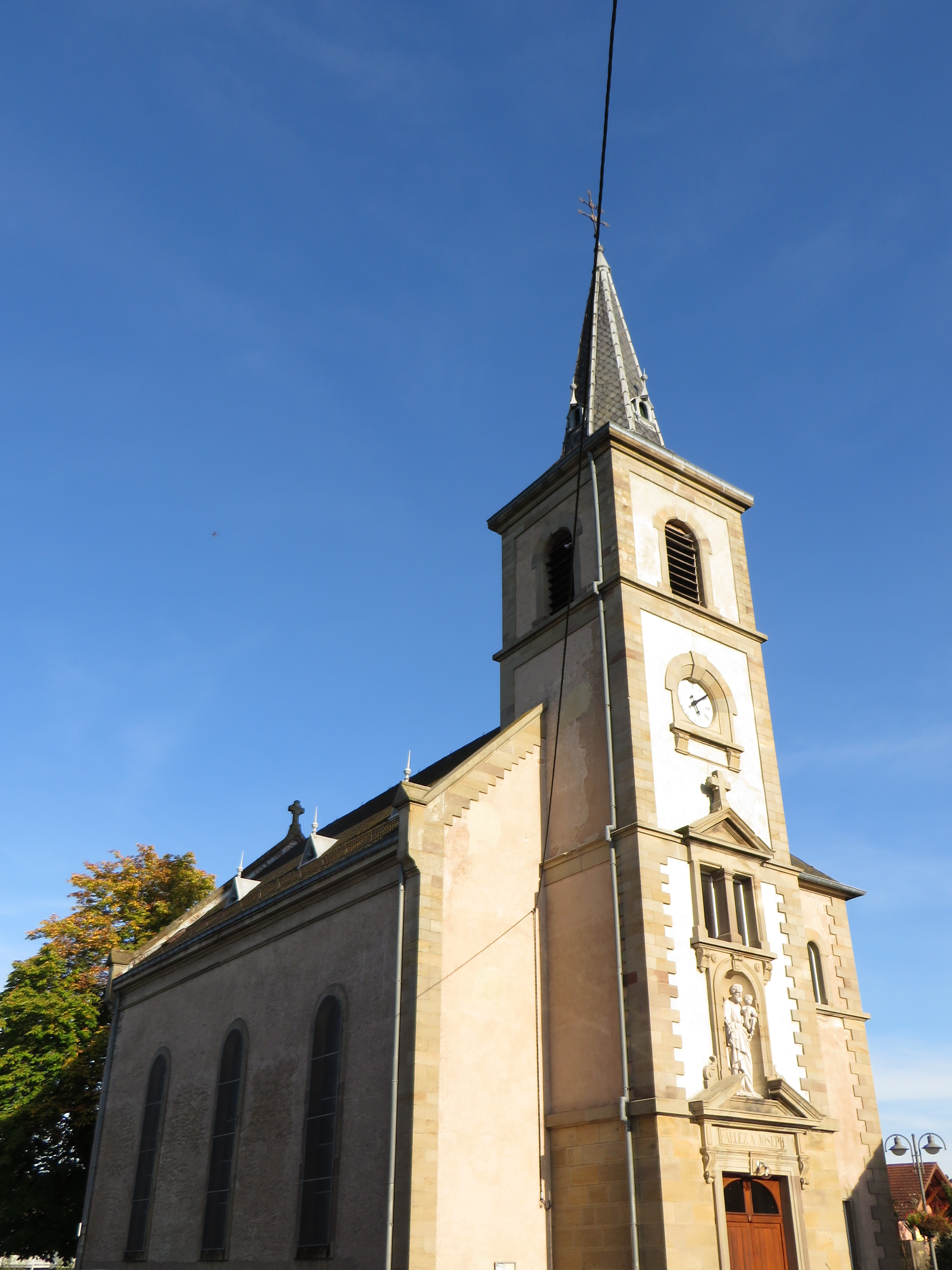
- The church in Hermelange

- Coat of arms
- Location of Hermelange
- Location within France Location within Grand Est
- Coordinates: 48°40′49″N 7°01′04″E
- Country: France
- Region: Grand Est
- Department: Moselle
- Arrondissement: Sarrebourg-Château-Salins
- Canton: Phalsbourg
- Intercommunality: Sarrebourg - Moselle Sud

Government
  - Mayor (2020–2026): Claude Gasser
- Area^{1}: 2.58 km^{2} (1.00 sq mi)
- Elevation: 250 m (820 ft)
- Highest elevation: 334 m (1,096 ft)
- Lowest elevation: 255 m (837 ft)
- Population (2023): 227
  - Density: 88.0/km^{2} (228/sq mi)
- Time zone: UTC+01:00 (CET)
  - Summer (DST): UTC+02:00 (CEST)
- INSEE/Postal code: 57318 /57790
- ^{1} French Land Register data, which excludes lakes, ponds, glaciers > 1 km^{2} (0.386 sq mi or 247 acres) and river estuaries.

Hermelange (French pronunciation: [ɛʁməlɑ̃ʒ]; German: Hermelingen) is a commune in the Moselle department in Grand Est in north-eastern France.

== See also ==
- Communes of the Moselle department
