= Hangviller =

- Commune
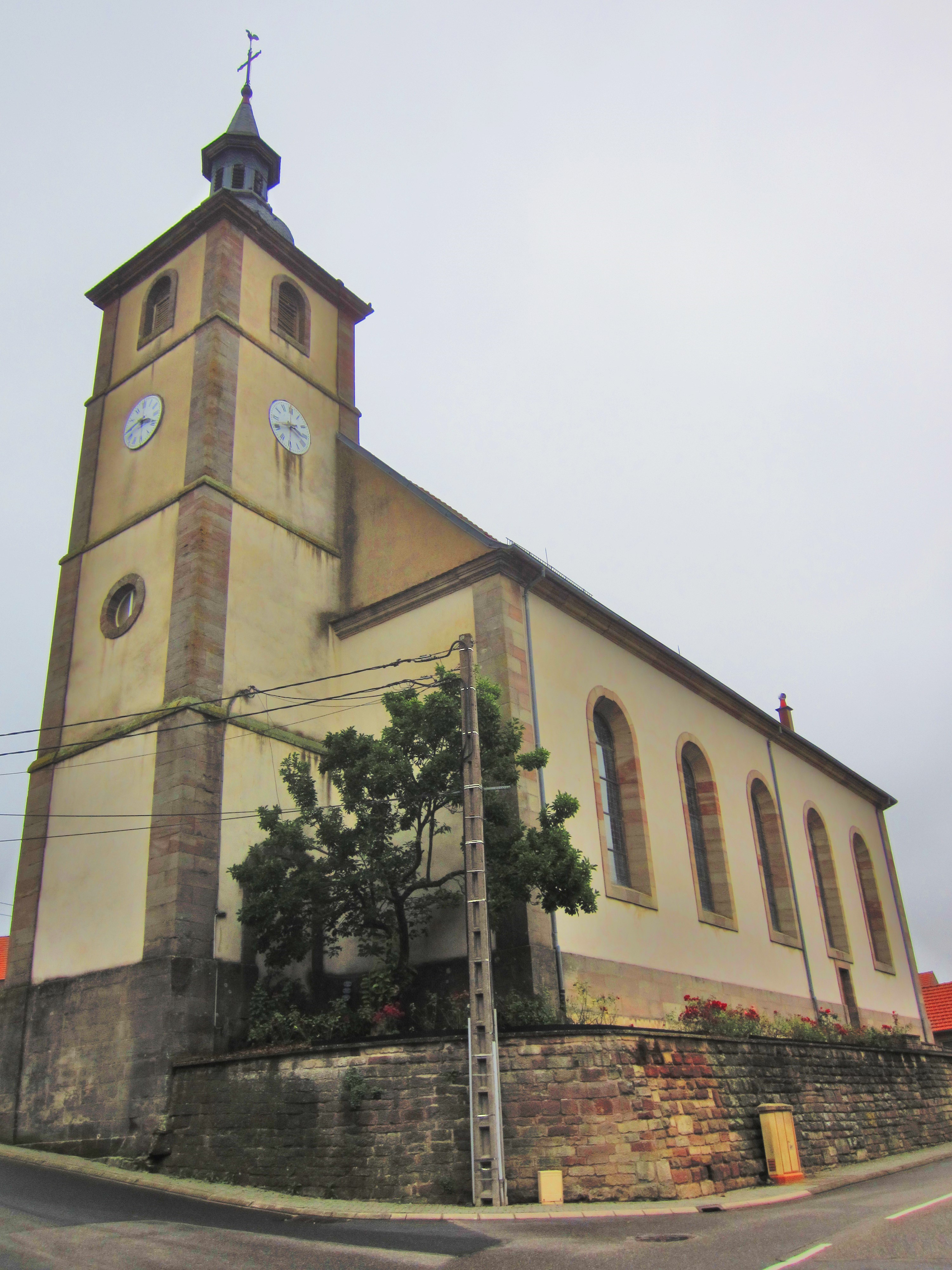
- The Lutheran church in Hangviller

- Coat of arms
- Location of Hangviller
- Location within France Location within Grand Est
- Coordinates: 48°48′37″N 7°13′47″E
- Country: France
- Region: Grand Est
- Department: Moselle
- Arrondissement: Sarrebourg-Château-Salins
- Canton: Phalsbourg
- Intercommunality: Pays de Phalsbourg

Government
  - Mayor (2020–2026): Patrick Distel
- Area^{1}: 4.52 km^{2} (1.75 sq mi)
- Elevation: 250 m (820 ft)
- Highest elevation: 302 m (991 ft)
- Lowest elevation: 217 m (712 ft)
- Population (2023): 253
  - Density: 56.0/km^{2} (145/sq mi)
- Time zone: UTC+01:00 (CET)
  - Summer (DST): UTC+02:00 (CEST)
- INSEE/Postal code: 57291 /57370
- ^{1} French Land Register data, which excludes lakes, ponds, glaciers > 1 km^{2} (0.386 sq mi or 247 acres) and river estuaries.

Hangviller (German: Hangweiler) is a commune in the Moselle department in Grand Est in north-eastern France.

== See also ==
- Communes of the Moselle department
