= Waltembourg =

- Commune
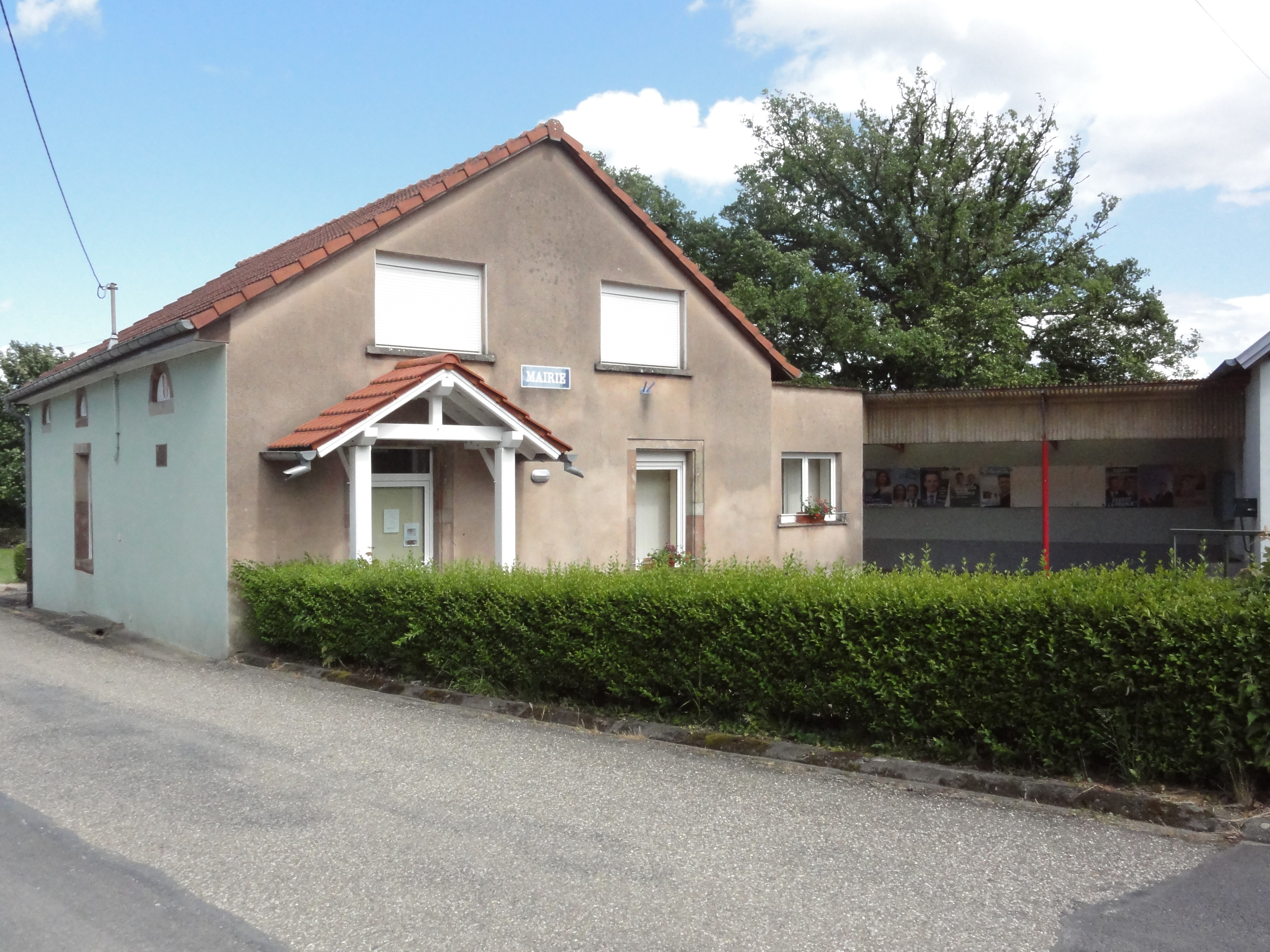
- The town hall in Waltembourg

- Coat of arms
- Location of Waltembourg
- Location within France Location within Grand Est
- Coordinates: 48°45′02″N 7°11′54″E
- Country: France
- Region: Grand Est
- Department: Moselle
- Arrondissement: Sarrebourg-Château-Salins
- Canton: Phalsbourg
- Intercommunality: Pays de Phalsbourg

Government
  - Mayor (2020–2026): Jean-Marc Freismuth
- Area^{1}: 1.4 km^{2} (0.54 sq mi)
- Elevation: 342 m (1,122 ft)
- Highest elevation: 350 m (1,150 ft)
- Lowest elevation: 280 m (920 ft)
- Population (2023): 227
  - Density: 160/km^{2} (420/sq mi)
- Time zone: UTC+01:00 (CET)
  - Summer (DST): UTC+02:00 (CEST)
- INSEE/Postal code: 57743 /57370
- ^{1} French Land Register data, which excludes lakes, ponds, glaciers > 1 km^{2} (0.386 sq mi or 247 acres) and river estuaries.

Waltembourg (French pronunciation: [valtɑ̃buʁ]; German: Waldenburg) is the commune in the Moselle department in Grand Est in north-eastern France.

== Population ==
Historical population
Year	Pop.	±% p.a.
1968	85	—
1975	104	+2.92%
1982	166	+6.91%
1990	199	+2.29%
1999	201	+0.11%
2007	228	+1.59%
2012	247	+1.61%
2017	243	−0.33%
2023	227	−1.13%
Source: INSEE

== See also ==
- Communes of the Moselle department
