= Hérange =

- Commune
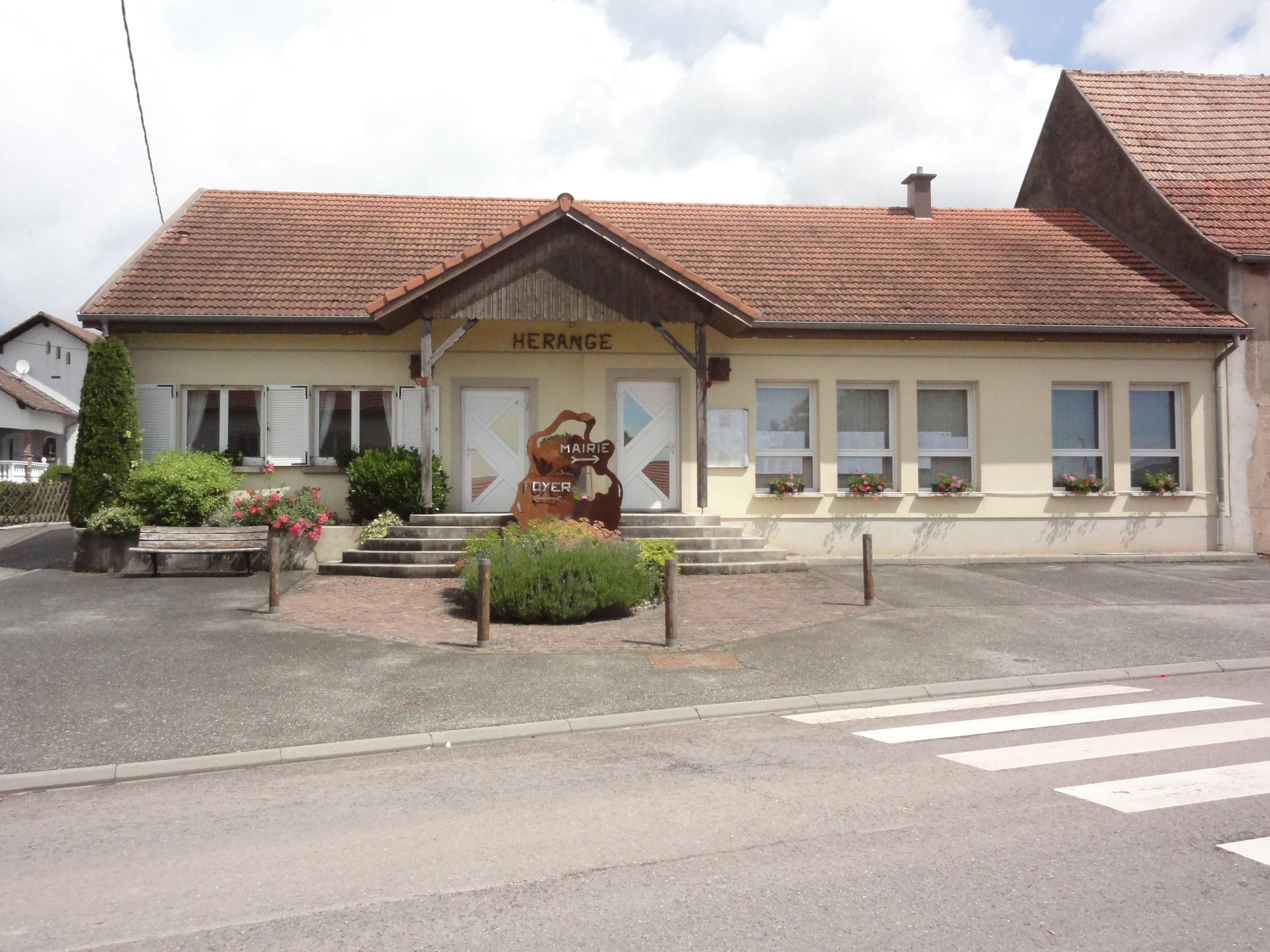
- The town hall in Hérange

- Coat of arms
- Location of Hérange
- Location within France Location within Grand Est
- Coordinates: 48°46′32″N 7°10′14″E
- Country: France
- Region: Grand Est
- Department: Moselle
- Arrondissement: Sarrebourg-Château-Salins
- Canton: Phalsbourg
- Intercommunality: Pays de Phalsbourg

Government
  - Mayor (2020–2026): Denis Kuchly
- Area^{1}: 2.73 km^{2} (1.05 sq mi)
- Elevation: 283 m (928 ft)
- Highest elevation: 334 m (1,096 ft)
- Lowest elevation: 274 m (899 ft)
- Population (2023): 104
  - Density: 38.1/km^{2} (98.7/sq mi)
- Time zone: UTC+01:00 (CET)
  - Summer (DST): UTC+02:00 (CEST)
- INSEE/Postal code: 57317 /57635
- ^{1} French Land Register data, which excludes lakes, ponds, glaciers > 1 km^{2} (0.386 sq mi or 247 acres) and river estuaries.

Hérange (French pronunciation: [eʁɑ̃ʒ]; German: Heringen) is a commune in the Moselle department in Grand Est in north-eastern France.

== See also ==
- Communes of the Moselle department
