= Nitting =

- Commune
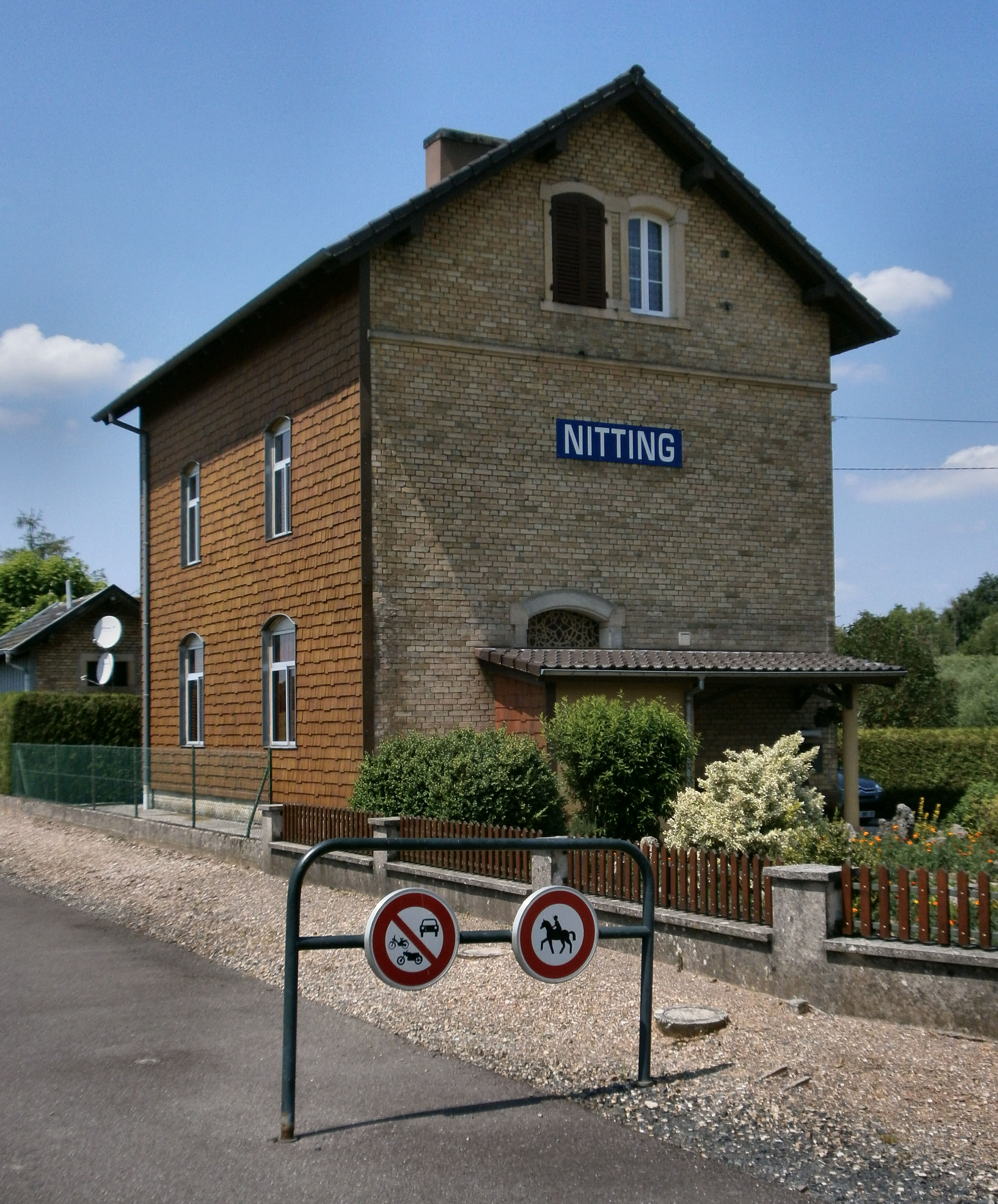
- The old railway station in Nitting

- Coat of arms
- Location of Nitting
- Location within France Location within Grand Est
- Coordinates: 48°40′18″N 7°01′50″E
- Country: France
- Region: Grand Est
- Department: Moselle
- Arrondissement: Sarrebourg-Château-Salins
- Canton: Phalsbourg
- Intercommunality: Sarrebourg - Moselle Sud

Government
  - Mayor (2020–2026): Jean-Luc Chaigneau
- Area^{1}: 8.86 km^{2} (3.42 sq mi)
- Elevation: 280 m (920 ft)
- Highest elevation: 340 m (1,120 ft)
- Lowest elevation: 263 m (863 ft)
- Population (2023): 529
  - Density: 59.7/km^{2} (155/sq mi)
- Time zone: UTC+01:00 (CET)
  - Summer (DST): UTC+02:00 (CEST)
- INSEE/Postal code: 57509 /57790
- ^{1} French Land Register data, which excludes lakes, ponds, glaciers > 1 km^{2} (0.386 sq mi or 247 acres) and river estuaries.

Nitting (French pronunciation: [nitɛ̃]; German: Nittingen) is a commune in the Moselle department in Grand Est in north-eastern France.

== See also ==
- Communes of the Moselle department
