= Vescheim =

- Commune
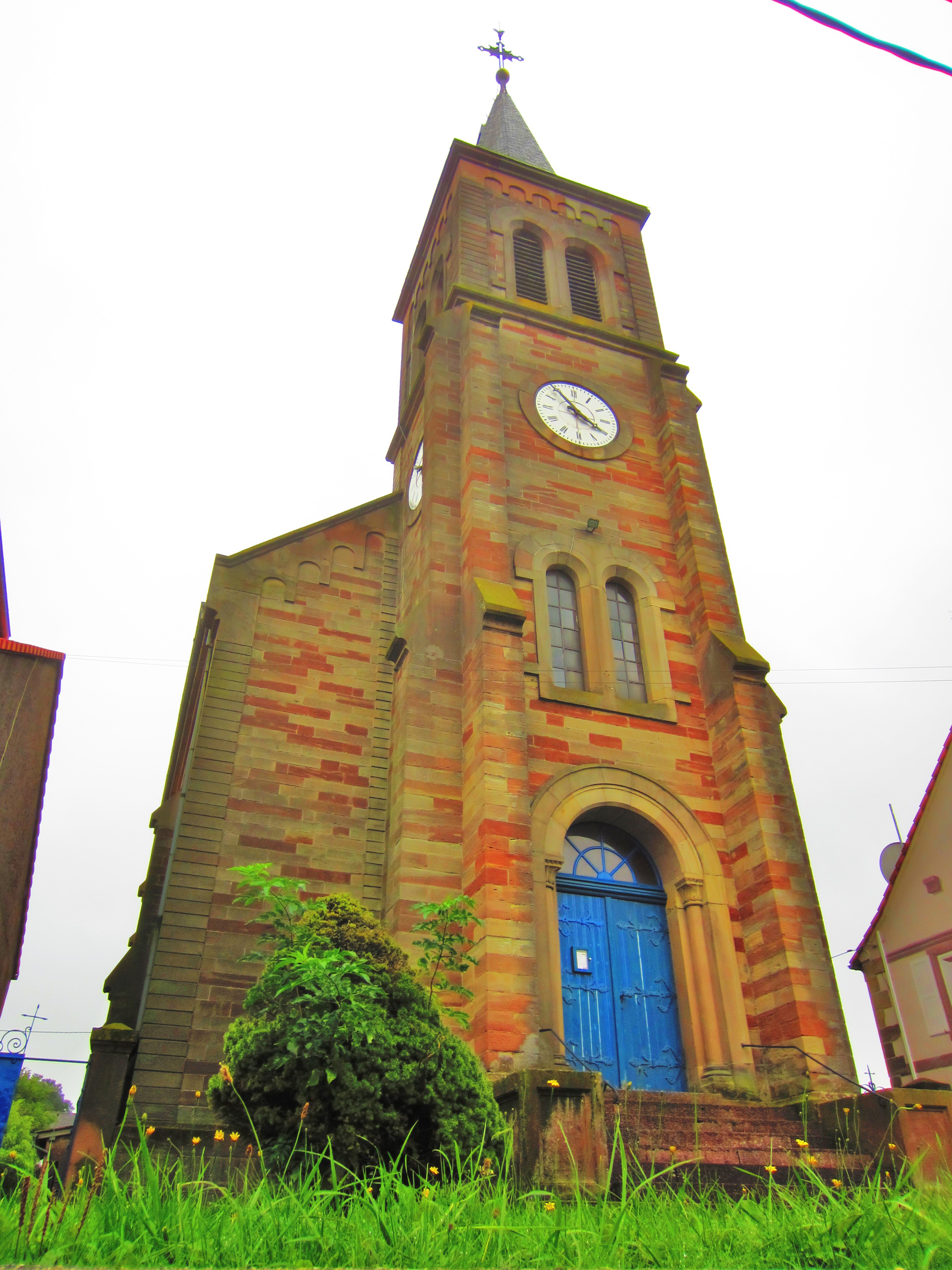
- The church in Vescheim

- Coat of arms
- Location of Vescheim
- Location within France Location within Grand Est
- Coordinates: 48°47′48″N 7°13′45″E
- Country: France
- Region: Grand Est
- Department: Moselle
- Arrondissement: Sarrebourg-Château-Salins
- Canton: Phalsbourg
- Intercommunality: Pays de Phalsbourg

Government
  - Mayor (2020–2026): Sylvain Demoulin
- Area^{1}: 1.81 km^{2} (0.70 sq mi)
- Elevation: 320 m (1,050 ft)
- Highest elevation: 295 m (968 ft)
- Lowest elevation: 237 m (778 ft)
- Population (2023): 305
  - Density: 169/km^{2} (436/sq mi)
- Time zone: UTC+01:00 (CET)
  - Summer (DST): UTC+02:00 (CEST)
- INSEE/Postal code: 57709 /57370
- ^{1} French Land Register data, which excludes lakes, ponds, glaciers > 1 km^{2} (0.386 sq mi or 247 acres) and river estuaries.

Vescheim (German: Weschheim) is a commune in the Moselle department in Grand Est in north-eastern France.

== See also ==
- Communes of the Moselle department
