= Bourscheid, Moselle =

Bourscheid
- Commune
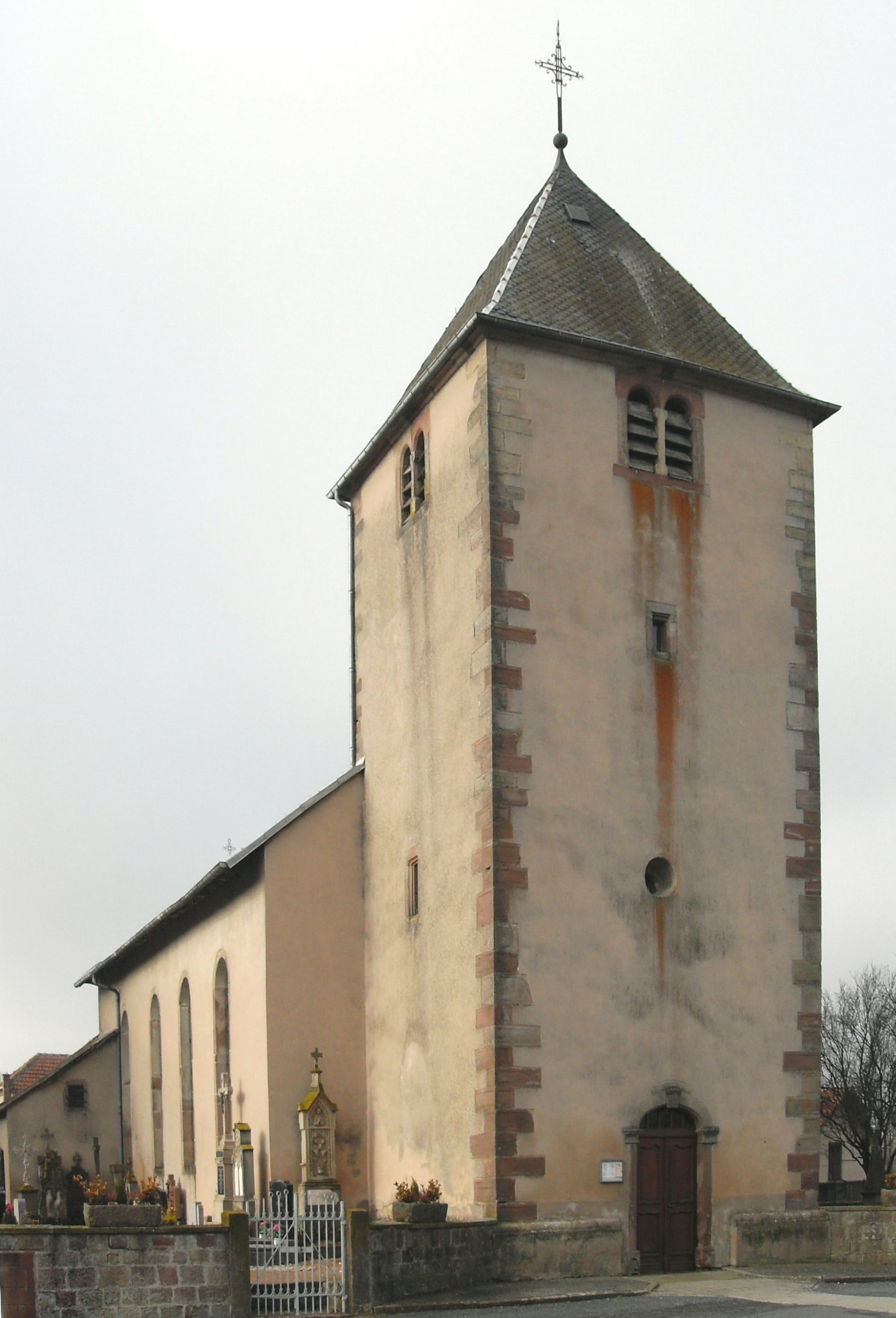
- The church in Bourscheid

- Coat of arms
- Location of Bourscheid
- Location within France Location within Grand Est
- Coordinates: 48°46′20″N 7°11′28″E
- Country: France
- Region: Grand Est
- Department: Moselle
- Arrondissement: Sarrebourg-Château-Salins
- Canton: Phalsbourg
- Intercommunality: Pays de Phalsbourg

Government
  - Mayor (2020–2026): Régis Idoux
- Area^{1}: 3.99 km^{2} (1.54 sq mi)
- Elevation: 283 m (928 ft)
- Highest elevation: 332 m (1,089 ft)
- Lowest elevation: 279 m (915 ft)
- Population (2023): 173
  - Density: 43.4/km^{2} (112/sq mi)
- Time zone: UTC+01:00 (CET)
  - Summer (DST): UTC+02:00 (CEST)
- INSEE/Postal code: 57100 /57370
- ^{1} French Land Register data, which excludes lakes, ponds, glaciers > 1 km^{2} (0.386 sq mi or 247 acres) and river estuaries.

Bourscheid (French pronunciation: [buʁʃaid]; German: Burscheid) is a commune in the Moselle department in Grand Est in northeastern France.

== Population ==
Historical population
Year	Pop.	±% p.a.
1968	67	—
1975	121	+8.81%
1982	130	+1.03%
1990	121	−0.89%
1999	227	+7.24%
2007	200	−1.57%
2012	215	+1.46%
2017	179	−3.60%
2023	173	−0.57%
Source: INSEE

== See also ==
- Communes of the Moselle department
