= German Shoe Road =

The German Shoe Road (German: Deutsche Schuhstraße) is one of several tourist-oriented, themed routes in southern Rheinhessen and in the West Palatinate in the German state of Rhineland-Palatinate. It is a circular route of more than 300 km largely running within the Palatine Forest-North Vosges Biosphere Reserve often on scenic secondary roads.

== Route ==
The German Shoe Road includes the following way stations:

Alzey, Wendelsheim, Nack, Bechenheim, Nieder-Wiesen, Kriegsfeld, Unterthierwasen, Bastenhaus-Dannenfels, Marienthal, Falkenstein, Enkenbach-Alsenborn, Hochspeyer, Johanniskreuz, Hauenstein, Dahn, Busenberg, Fischbach, Eppenbrunn, Trulben, Pirmasens, Walshausen, Rieschweiler-Mühlbach, Wallhalben, Mittelbrunn, Landstuhl, Miesenbach, Altenglan, Aschbach, Lauterecken, Meisenheim, Fürfeld, Wonsheim, Wendelsheim, Alzey

Near Pirmasens the German Shoe Road divides into various branches that link e.g. Rodalben and Waldfischbach-Burgalben as well as Lemberg.

== History ==
The German Shoe Road was established in 1977 by the Pirmasens Regional Association (Großraum Pirmasens), because the heart of the German shoe industry was based here from the early 19th century. After many shoe factories in Germany closed or transferred their manufacturing overseas in the wake of globalisation, the German Shoe Road was not widely advertised and was one of less well known tourist routes by the early 21st century.

== Sights ==
Lakes and rivers – east of Waldfischbach-Burgalben the route passes along the Schwarzbachtal valley and runs past the Clausensee lake. Almost all other sections of the German Shoe Road run along waterways in the region. In the area of Pirmasens these include the Schwarzbach Queich, Wieslauter, Saarbach (with its Mühlweiher reservoir at the Saarbacherhammer), Rodalb and Merzalbe.

Rock formations – tourist destinations, some even for sports climbers, include the numerous bunter sandstone rock formations, especially in the Wasgau. These include the Devil's Table and the Jungfernsprung in the Dahner Felsenland.

Hills and mountains – in its northern section the road passes the highest mountain in the Palatinate region, the 689 metre high Donnersberg, which is surrounded by five ruined medieval castles.

Castles – other castles include Drachenfels, Berwartstein, Lemberg and Gräfenstein. The Heidelsburg even goes back to the days of the Roman Empire.
