= Merzalbe =

River in Germany

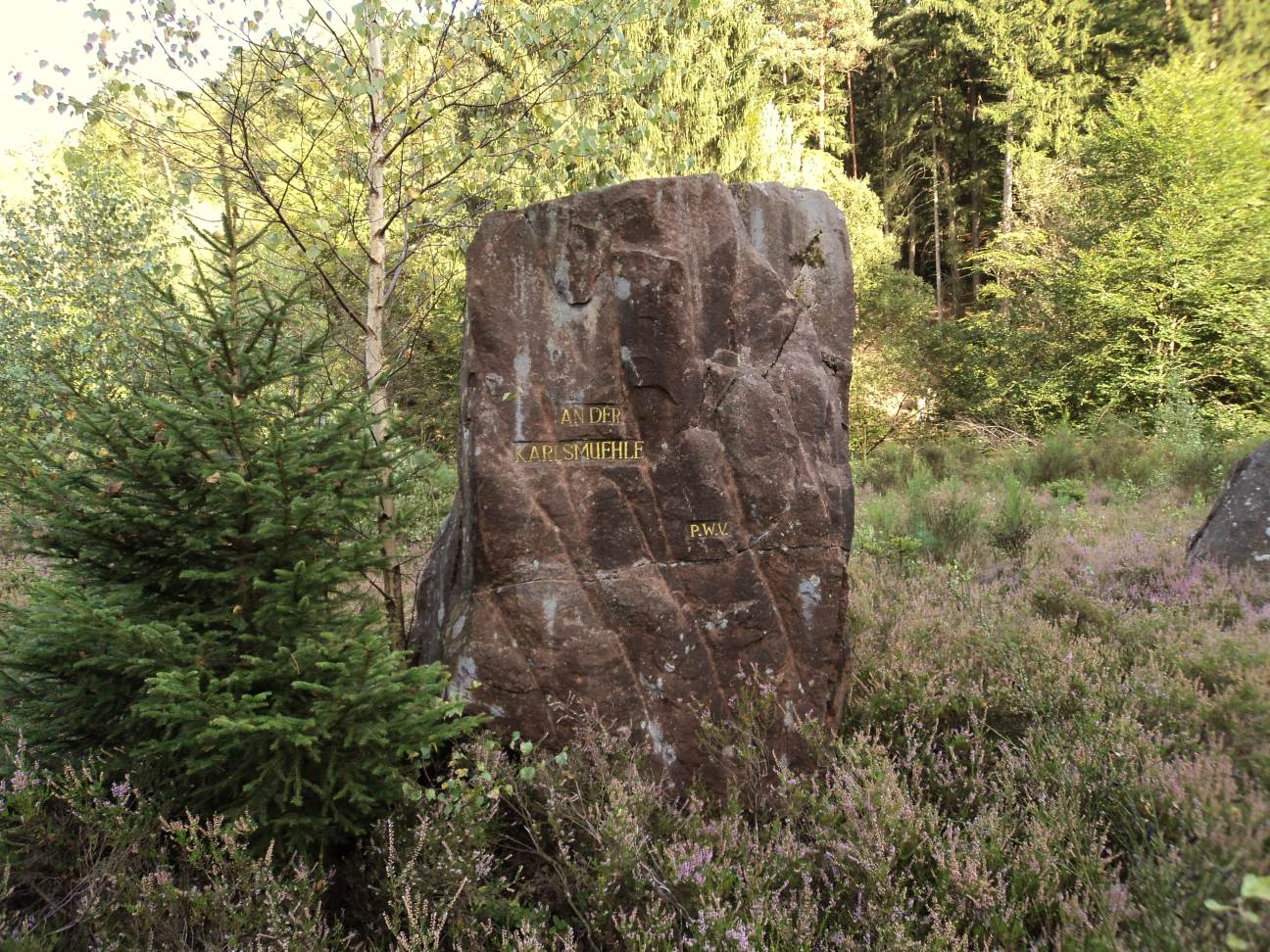
- Ritterstein 231 at the place of the defunct mill Karlsmühle

Location
- Country: Germany
- State: Rhineland-Palatinate
- Reference no.: DE: 2642644

Physical characteristics
- Source
  - location: East of Leimen in the Christelbrunnen
  - coordinates: 49°16′43″N 7°49′00″E
  - elevation: ca. 488 m above sea level (NN)
- Mouth
  - location: Near Münchweiler into the Rodalb
  - coordinates: 49°14′04″N 7°41′30″E
  - elevation: ca. 264 m above sea level (NN)
- Length: 12.18 km (7.57 mi)
- Basin size: 28.719 km^{2} (11.088 sq mi)

Basin features
- Progression: Rodalb→ Schwarzbach→ Blies→ Saar→ Moselle→ Rhine→ North Sea
- Landmarks: Villages: Leimen, Merzalben, Münchweiler

The Merzalbe, also called the Merzalb, is a stream, over 12 km (7.5 mi) long, in the Western Palatinate in the German state of Rhineland-Palatinate. It is an orographically right tributary of the Rodalb. In its upper reaches it is also called Mühlgraben.

== Course ==
The Merzalbe rises in the middle of the Palatine Forest, west of the Palatine Watershed and between the two hills of the Weißenberg and the Eschkopf at a height of just under 500 metres. Its source is enclosed by the Christelbrunnen well. As it heads in a southwesterly direction the Merzalbe flows through the valley below the village of Leimen and then through Merzalben. After 12 km (7.5 mi) it empties from the right into the Rodalb near the Riegelbrunnerhof, a hamlet belonging to Münchweiler. Its waters then flow down the Schwarzbach, Blies, Saar and Moselle before finally reaching the Rhine.

== Name ==
The name "Merzalbe" means "stream of the Mericho" (Bach des Mericho) and goes back to a Frankish settler who must have made his residence here long before the first record in 1237 of the place of the same name by the stream. In this document Count Frederick III of Leiningen was given Castrum Grebinstein and granted the villages of Merichisalbin, Rothalbin and Eiswilre.

In ignorance of this recorded origin of the name, a theory later arose that the name "Merzalb" meant "harmful / useless stream", because the first part of the name was thought to be related to the word ausmerzen ("eradicate") and thus to mean that either large amounts of water poured through the valley when the snow melted, causing damage, or that - more likely - the stream usually had too little water to be suitable for the operation of a mill.

== Sights ==
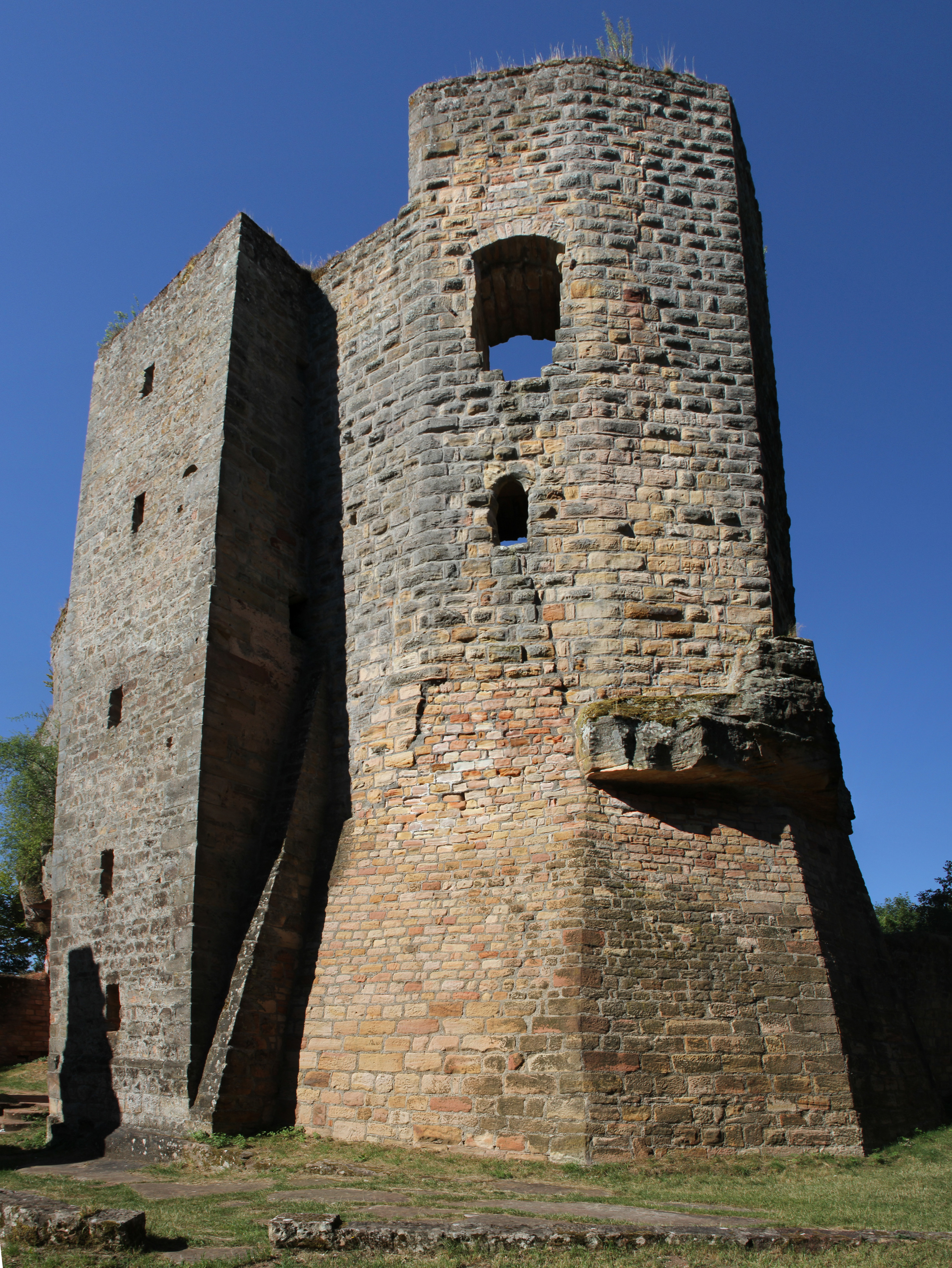
Gräfenstein Castle's bergfried above the Merzalb valley

Gräfenstein Castle – the castle which measures 80 by 60 metres, above the Merzalb valley is one of the best preserved and most impressive castles built by the Hohenstaufen dynasty in the Palatinate region. The keep or bergfried is unique because of its heptagonal footprint.

Tourist route – the German Shoe Road runs parallel to the Merzalb valley through Merzalben and Leimen; it is part of the Franco-German Tourist Route.

== See also ==
- List of rivers of Rhineland-Palatinate
