= Einöd =

Einöd Ehnet (Palatine German)
- Stadtteil of Homburg
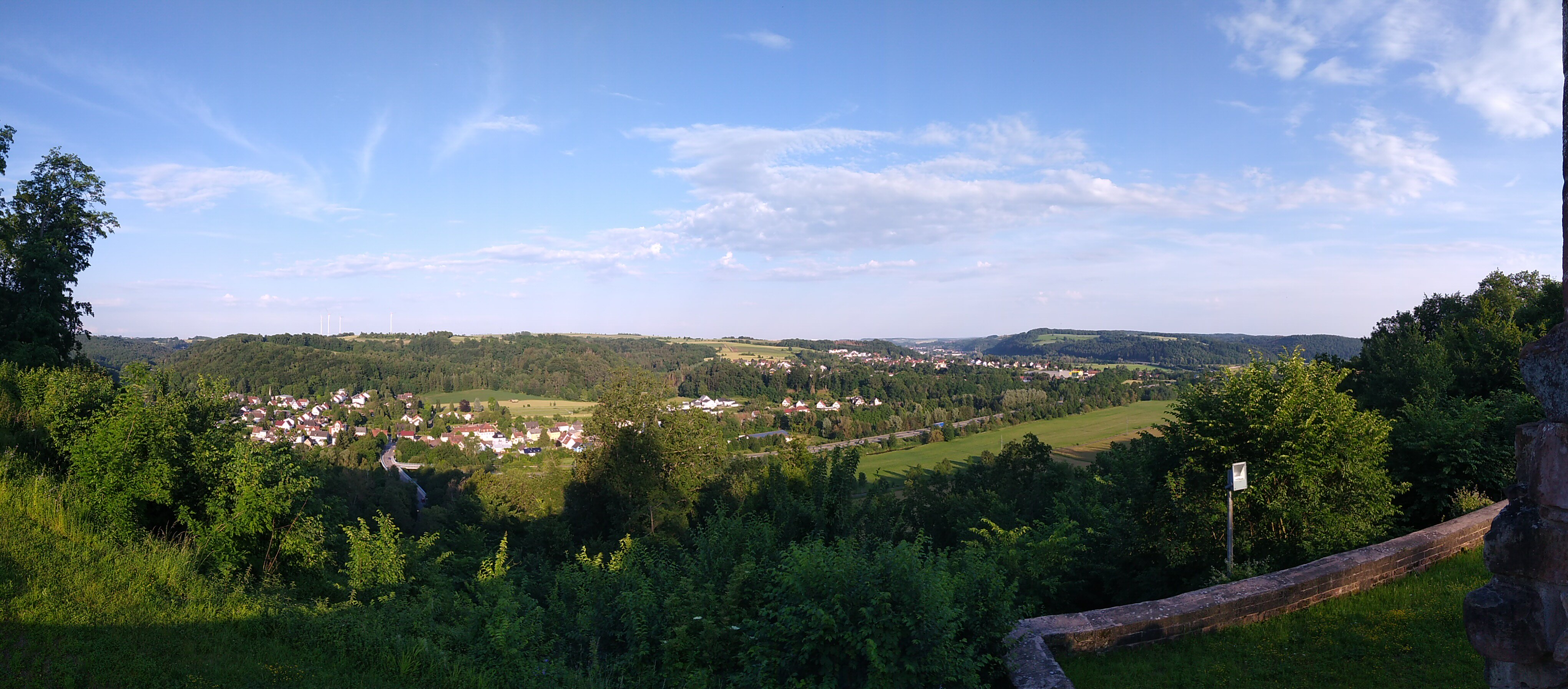
- View of Einöd (Saar) as seen from Wörschweiler Abbey

- Coat of arms
- Interactive map of Einöd
- Location within Germany Location within Saarland
- Coordinates: 49°16′10.6″N 7°19′8.0″E
- Country: Germany
- State: Saarland
- District: Saarpfalz-Kreis
- Municipality: Homburg

Government
  - Mayor: Dr.med. Karl Schuberth (SPD)

Area
  - Total: 3.21 km^{2} (1.24 sq mi)
- Elevation: 228 m (748 ft)

Population (2021)
  - Total: 3,392
  - Density: 1,060/km^{2} (2,740/sq mi)
- Time zone: UTC+01:00 (CET)
  - Summer (DST): UTC+02:00 (CEST)
- Postal codes: 66424
- Dialling codes: 06848
- Vehicle registration: HOM

The municipal district of Einöd (German: [ˈaɪnœt]; Palatine German: Ehnet [ˈɛːnɘt]) is a quarter (Stadtteil) of the city of Homburg and part of Saarpfalz-Kreis in Saarland. It includes three municipal divisions: Einöd, Ingweiler and Schwarzenacker. In 2021, Einöd had 3,392 inhabitants.

== History ==
There is evidence of Einöd existing in Roman and Celtic times and originating in Paleolithic times, as artifacts and remains may indicate.

=== Schwarzenacker fraction ===
Roman Vicus in Einöd Schwarzenacker
- Römerausgrabungen in Einöd Schwarzenacker
- Einöd (Saar)
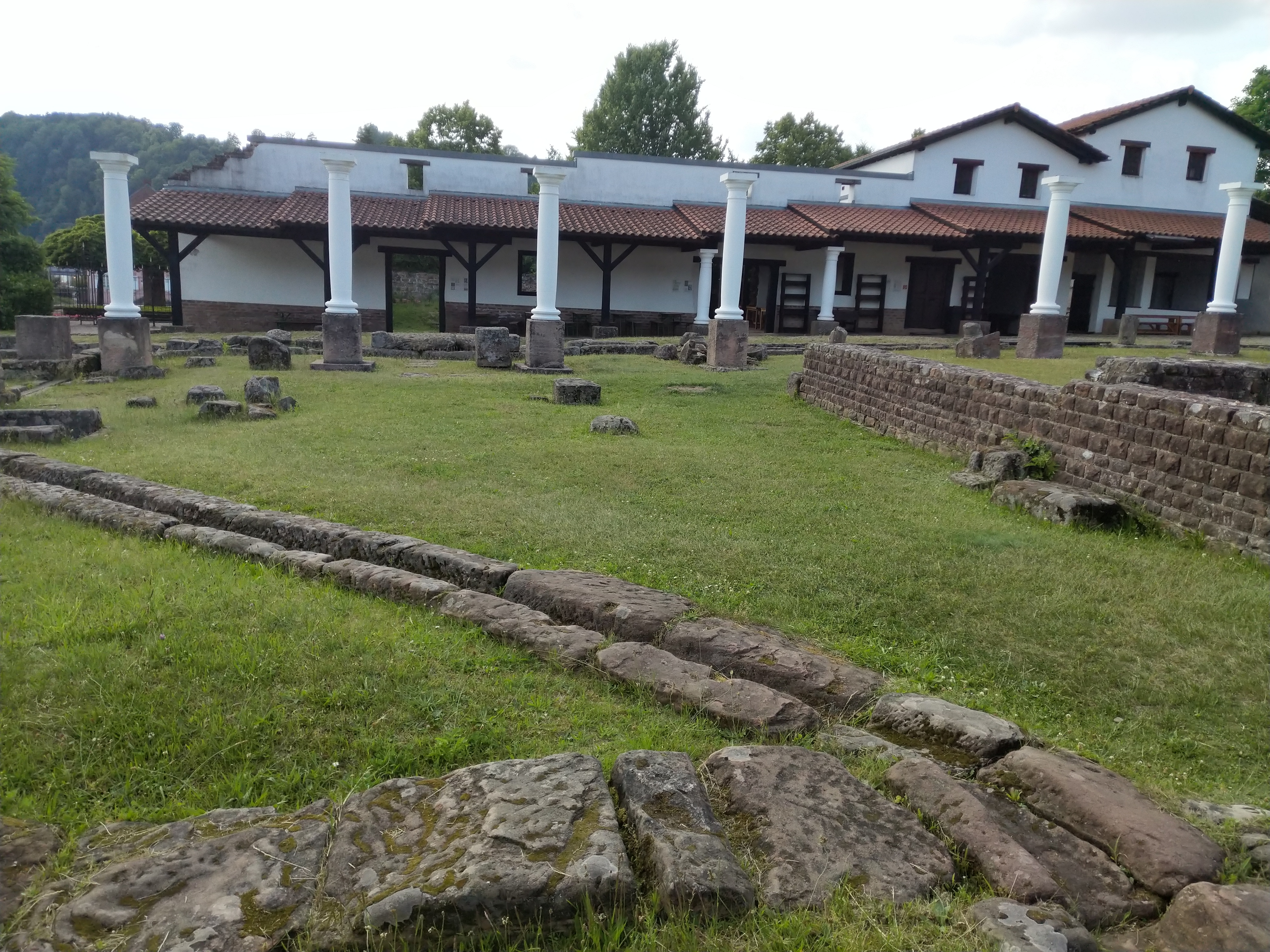
- Roman Ruins in Einöd Schwarzenacker

Site information
- Type: Vicus, Archaeological site
- Code: DE-SL
- Condition: Ruins (Aprrox. 8% uncovered)

Location
- Location within Germany
- Coordinates: 49°16′58.3″N 7°19′04.4″E
- Height: 231 m above sea level (NN)

Site history
- Built: 1st century CE, during the reign of Imperator Caesar Divi Filius Augustus

There is historical evidence that the area of Schwarzenacker was populated since the Bronze Age (c. 1100 BCE) and from the late La Tène period in 450 BCE to the Roman conquest in the 1st century BCE. During the reign of Augustus, a Gallo-Roman Vicus was founded in 1 CE at the site of an older Celtic settlement in the Celtic tribal area of the Mediomatrici. The Vicus was built in the area of modern Schwarzenacker and was situated approximately two kilometers south of the intersection of the Roman long-distance routes between Trier-Strasbourg and Metz-Worms. Remains of other Roman habitations, such as the Roman Villa in Bierbach, the Temple District on the Rödersberg, and the Roman Sanctuary in the snake caves in Einöd, can be found close to the Vicus.

==== Roman settlement (Vicus) ====
The Vicus, whose name had not been determined, existed for nearly three centuries during the time of peace known as the Pax Romana. At the end of that period, in the spring of 276 CE, the town was destroyed by Alemanni and Frank tribes. In the first half of the 4th century, the Gallo-Roman site was again inhabited, but the villas and houses were only temporarily rebuilt and the settlement was abandoned.

In the Middle Ages, Monks from the Wörschweiler Abbey found evidence of an ancient town below the fields that they used as farmland. They observed a black layer of earth that was interpreted as evidence of an ancient fire and stone foundations under the earth that damaged the plows. They interpreted the findings as the remains of an ancient Roman settlement. However, it was not until the 1950s that scientific excavations were conducted. Incidentally, the layer of black earth became eponymous of Schwarzenacker (black field).

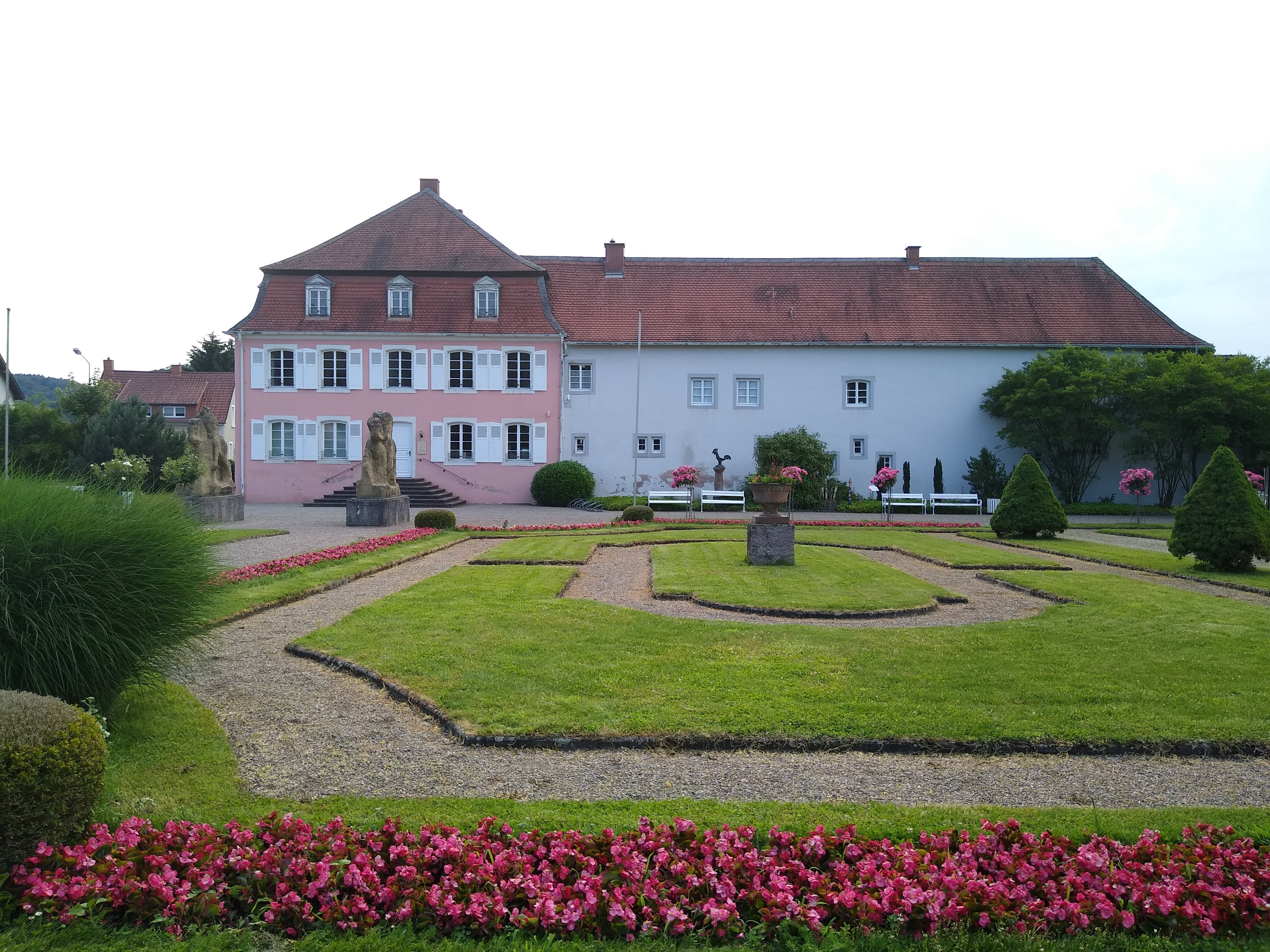
Edelhaus in Einöd Schwarzenacker

Only small parts of the former Vicus have been uncovered; however, the ruins and artifacts found at the archaeological site are of regional and national importance.

==== Museum at the site of the Roman settlement ====
The ancient ruins can be visited and are part of an open-air museum. Some of the discovered artifacts are on display at the Edelhaus, a noble house that is adjacent to the excavations. Excavated buildings, basements, streets and water channels have been found. Some of the buildings, such as the Taberna Capitolinus and the house of the Gallo-Roman ophthalmologist Sextus Ajacius Launus, have been partially reconstructed.

The Edelhaus hosts the museum. The artifacts displayed come from the settlement and from the nearby environment. Replicas of life-sized Roman equestrian statues, which were discovered in 1887 in nearby Breitfurt and which represent the largest of their kind north of the Alps, were erected in front of the entrance staircase of the noble house. The original statues stood for many years in front of the entrance of the Historical Museum of the Palatinate in Speyer. They were moved and placed under a roof in the courtyard of the museum of Speyer, as they were sustaining damage due to environmental influences.

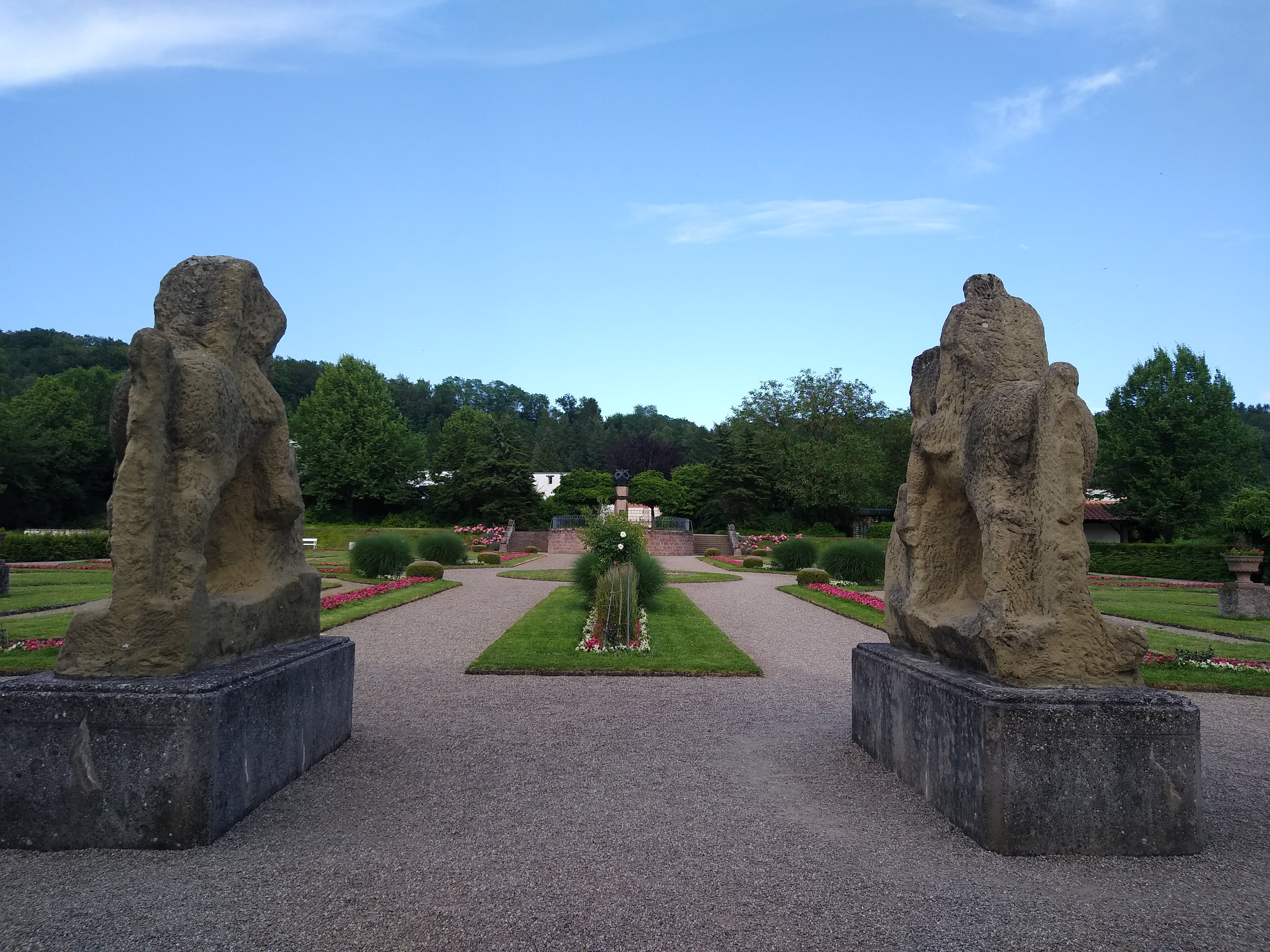
Roman equestrian statues of Tetricus I and Tetricus II at the Römermuseum Einöd Schwarzenacker

These statues are of historical interest, as they may illustrate the last usurper emperor of the Gallic Empire, Gaius Pius Esuvius Tetricus I (271 to 274 CE), and his son, Gaius Pius Esuvius Tetricus II, whom he had declared Caesar in 273. The horses with the riders were probably sculpted in honor of Tetricus I and Tetricus II, but they were never completed. Tetricus I and his son were defeated in 274 CE by the rightful emperor, Lucius Domitius Aurelianus Augustus, in the Battle of Châlons, near modern-day Châlons. Notwithstanding their defeat, Tetricus I was given the post of senator and corrector (governor) of either Lucania and Bruttii, in southern Italy, or all of Italy, and Tetricus II was given an administrative post.

=== Ingweiler fraction ===
The Ingweiler fraction was mentioned in 1180 CE in a deed of donation of Wörschweiler Abbey.

It is believed that there could be traces of Roman remains at the Ingweiler cemetery, where a chapel may have been built on top of a former Roman building. Until 1603, Ingweiler belonged to the county of Nassau-Saarbrücken; in an exchange agreement, Ingweiler came under the administration of the Duchy of Palatine Zweibrücken, of which Einöd was also part of.

=== Einöd fraction ===
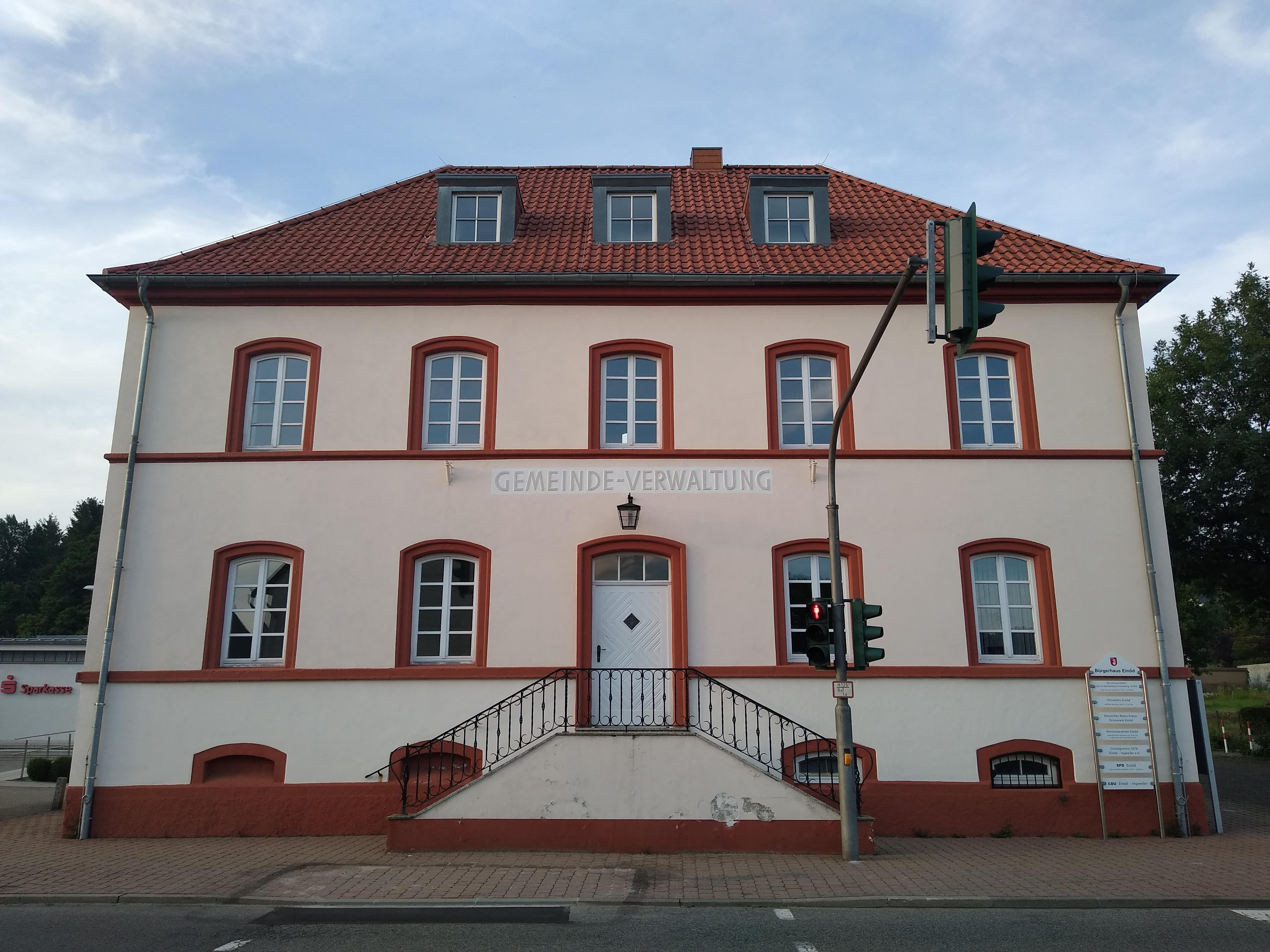
Bürgerhaus Einöd (Saar)

Salian Castle
- Salier Burg in Einöd (Saar)
- Homburg (Saar)-Einöd
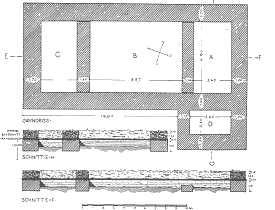
- Floor plan of the Salian Tower House in Einöd (Saar) from 1928.

Site information
- Type: Lowland castle, Motte
- Code: DE-SL
- Condition: Burgstall (No above-ground ruins discovered)

Location
- Location within Germany
- Coordinates: 49°15′56″N 7°18′55″E
- Height: 217 m above sea level (NN)

Site history
- Built: 10th century CE - 11th century CE

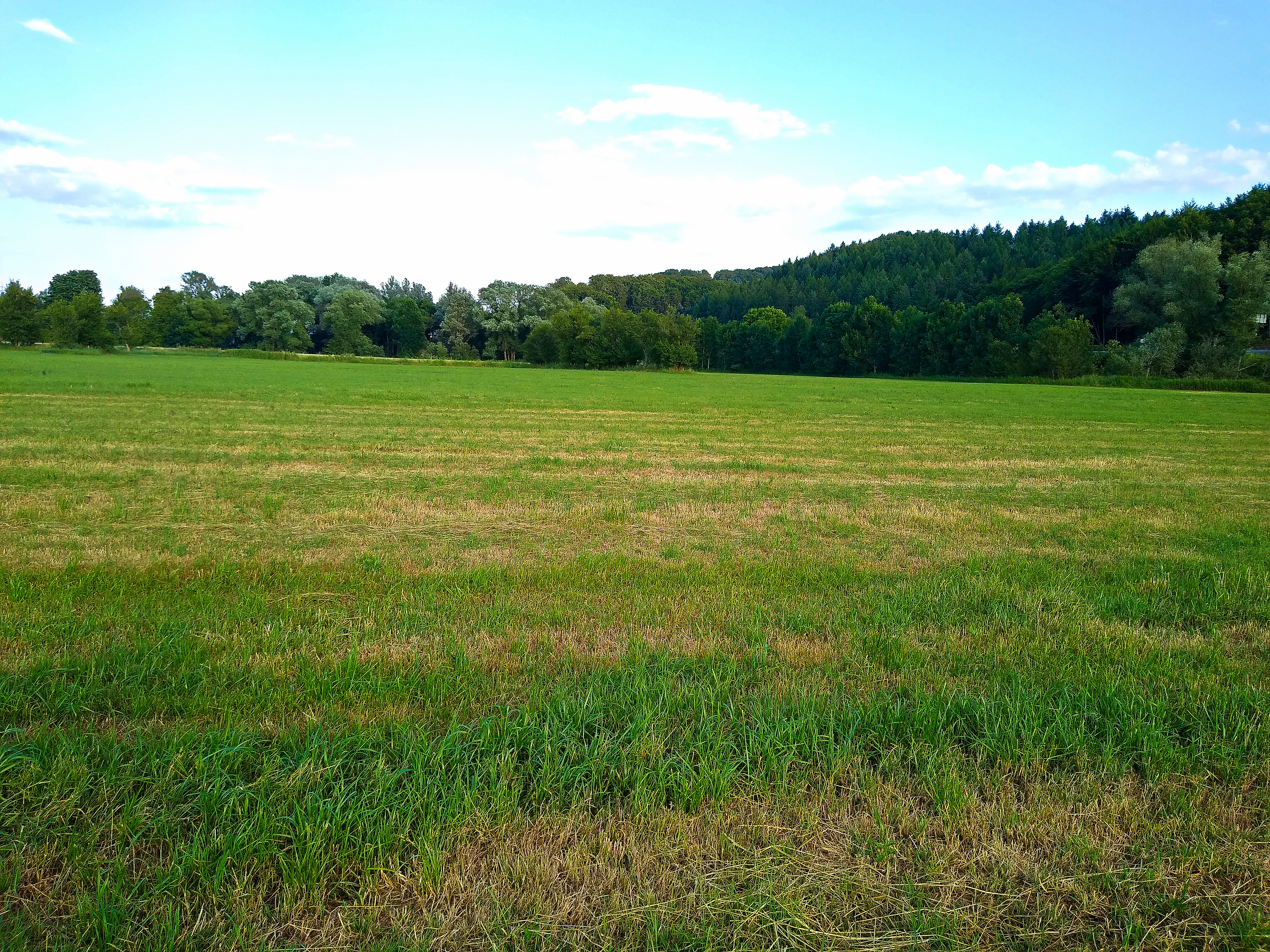
Site of Burgstall, Salian Castle in Einöd (Saar)

Close to where the river Schwarzbach merges with the smaller Blies, foundations of a Salian castle were uncovered that may be dated to the 10th or 11th century CE. In 1928 excavations under the leadership of the conservator Karl Klein brought to light the foundations of a rectangular, tripartite tower house.

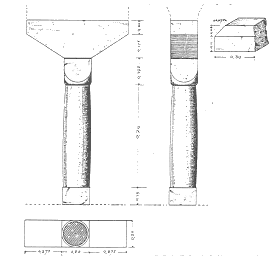
Cushion capitals of the Salian tower house in Einöd (Saar)

On the south side was a rectangular extension, that could have functioned as a cesspool, similar to the one found at the castle Schlössel in Klingenmünster. Fragments of Roman reliefs were found between the bricks of the destroyed castle walls. Two of these reliefs are exhibited in the neighboring Römermuseum Schwarzenacker. The spolia probably belonged to an ancient Roman cemetery or sanctuary that had been on site or in its vicinity and could have been associated with the Roman Vicus in Schwarzenacker. There were also found Romanesque column shafts with cushion capitals and imposts that may have been part of double windows at the upper floor of the tower. Unfortunately, no above-ground structures are visible and the ruins have been reduced over time to a Burgstall. In addition to these finds, even earlier remains of human habitation have been discovered, that may date back to the Paleolithic period.

The first documented mention of Einöd (Eynot) was recorded in a contract between Count Walram I. of Zweibrücken and Ludwig of Homburg that was signed on 3 June 1290 CE.

In 1760 CE Einöd became its own Schultheißerei, which meant that it had its own Schultheiß, a position that was similar to that of a mayor. It included the villages Einöd, Bierbach, Ingweiler, Nieder- and Obereschweiler, Audenkellerhof, Gutenbrunnen and Schwarzenacker.

In 1849 CE, Einöd-Ingweiler and Schwarzenacker got their own administration. The first mayor of Einöd was Joseph Schwarz. As a consequence of the territorial and administrative reform of 1974, Einöd ceased to be an independent municipality and became a municipal district of the city of Homburg and incorporated within Saarpfalz-Kreis (Saarpfalz-Kreis) of which Homburg is the administrative seat. The former town hall which was the administrative seat with a local mayor became later the "Bürgerhaus" or citizen hall. The Bürgerhaus has still an important cultural function in Einöd. It is the home of several local associations and institutions. These include the local district council, the district archive, the choir association Einöd-Ingweiler with the mixed choir, the Young Voices and the Young Foxes, as well as the Red Cross, the pensioners' association and the local associations of the political parties SPD and the CDU.

== Geography ==
Einöd sits northeast of the crossing point of the Blies and its tributary on its left, the Schwarzbach. The village is located in the southern part of Homburg at the eastern border of Saarpfalz-Kreis, which is at the south-eastern border of the State of Saarland. To the southeast, Einöd borders the town of Zweibrücken in the State of Rhineland-Palatinate. To the southwest, the town is bordered by Blieskastel in Saarpfalz-Kreis.

=== Climate ===
The weather patterns in the region are embedded within the Central European climate. According to the Köppen climate classification, the climate in the area around Einöd can be classified as CFB. These climates are often found on the western coasts of continents.

They are characterized by a humid climate with short dry summers. Heavy precipitation occurs during the mild winters because of continuous presence of mid-latitude cyclones. In Einöd the climate is warm and temperate. Even in the driest months, there is a significant amount of precipitation. The average annual temperature is 9.2 °C and approx. 699 mm of precipitation falls annually.

Einöd-Ingweiler, Saarland

Climate chart (precipitation, max. and min. temperature)
J	F	M	A	M	J	J	A	S	O	N	D
55 3 −2	50 5 −1	46 9 1	47 14 4	62 18 7	70 21 11	62 23 12	76 23 12	59 20 9	48 14 6	61 8 2	63 4 −1
- █ Average max. and min. temperatures in °C
- █ Precipitation totals in mm
Imperial conversion
J	F	M	A	M	J	J	A	S	O	N	D
2.2 37 28	2 41 29	1.8 49 33	1.9 57 38	2.4 65 45	2.8 71 51	2.4 74 54	3 73 53	2.3 67 49	1.9 57 42	2.4 46 35	2.5 39 31
- █ Average max. and min. temperatures in °F
- █ Precipitation totals in inches

During the winter months, temperatures below 0 °C can be reached and the summer months can be rather hot reaching up to 40 °C. The Bliesgau, to which Einöd belongs, is thus considered one of the warmest areas in Germany and is only bested by Oberrheingraben and Breisgau in southern Germany.

=== Environment ===
==== Bliesgau ====
The district Einöd is part of the biosphere reserve Bliesgau with the Pfänderbachtal in Einöd forming a core zone of 45 hectares. The region is a sanctuary for many rare animal and plant species such as the little owl, beaver, red kite, lizard orchid, and the yellow rattle. Almost half of all types of orchids that occur in Germany can be found here, on the vast, semi-dry grasslands that cover formations of limestone. Over the years the area has become a breeding ground for storks and nests with young birds can be observed. At certain periods dozens of storks can be observed in the air or on the ground.

The Bliesgau is located at the south-eastern corner of Saarland, bordering France and Rhineland-Palatinate. It is an area of outstanding natural beauty and cultural richness. The area is characterized by wide meadow orchards, beech groves and the impressive meadow landscape of the Blies River. Because of its picturesque landscape it is often referred to as the "Tuscany of Saarland". On 26 May 2009 the Bliesgau was recognized by UNESCO as a German Biosphere Reserve.

==== Guldenschlucht ====
The Guldenschlucht (Gulden Canyon) named after Alfred Gulden, is an impressive ravine with a small creek flowing at the bottom, and surrounded by looming boulders made of red sandstone. From top to bottom, it is approximately 460m long and has an elevation differential of 80m.

The canyon was forged post glacially and is thus of relatively recent geological origins. Immersed in a forest and enshrined by beech trees, the high humidity in the gorge has led to a unique vegetation. The rare lunar ivy (Lunaria rediviva), can be found in Saarland only at the Guldenschlucht.

Protected species such as the fire salamander (Salamandra salamandra) have their habitat in the Guldenschlucht. The rare fauna and flora make it thus an area of particular ecological interest.

A popular path leads through the canyon. It crosses over numerous small bridges and stairs from the State of Saarland to Rhineland-Palatinate with two thirds of the canyon belonging to the territory of Einöd and one third belonging to Zweibrücken.

The path is part of the Saar-Mosel hiking trail and often traversed by pilgrims as it is also a part of the Peregrinatio Compostellana (Jakobsweg or Way of Saint James), an international network of Pilgrimage routes that led to the shrine of the apostle Saint James the Great in the Cathedral of Santiago de Compostela in Galicia in northwestern Spain.

==== The Schlangenhöhlen (Snake Caves) ====
An area of geographic and natural interest are the snake caves. The designation of the area as snake caves can be traced back at least 500 years. The snake caves are a network of sandstone caves that are of natural and man made origins. A central cave was rediscovered during the first World War. Its creation is still debated. It is believed that it served as a sacred Roman burial ground and was associated to the Roman Vicus in Einöd Schwarzenacker. The cave shows traces of artificial building activity and has dozens of cavities branching off from the main cavity into all directions. A number of caves were used as a source of building material.

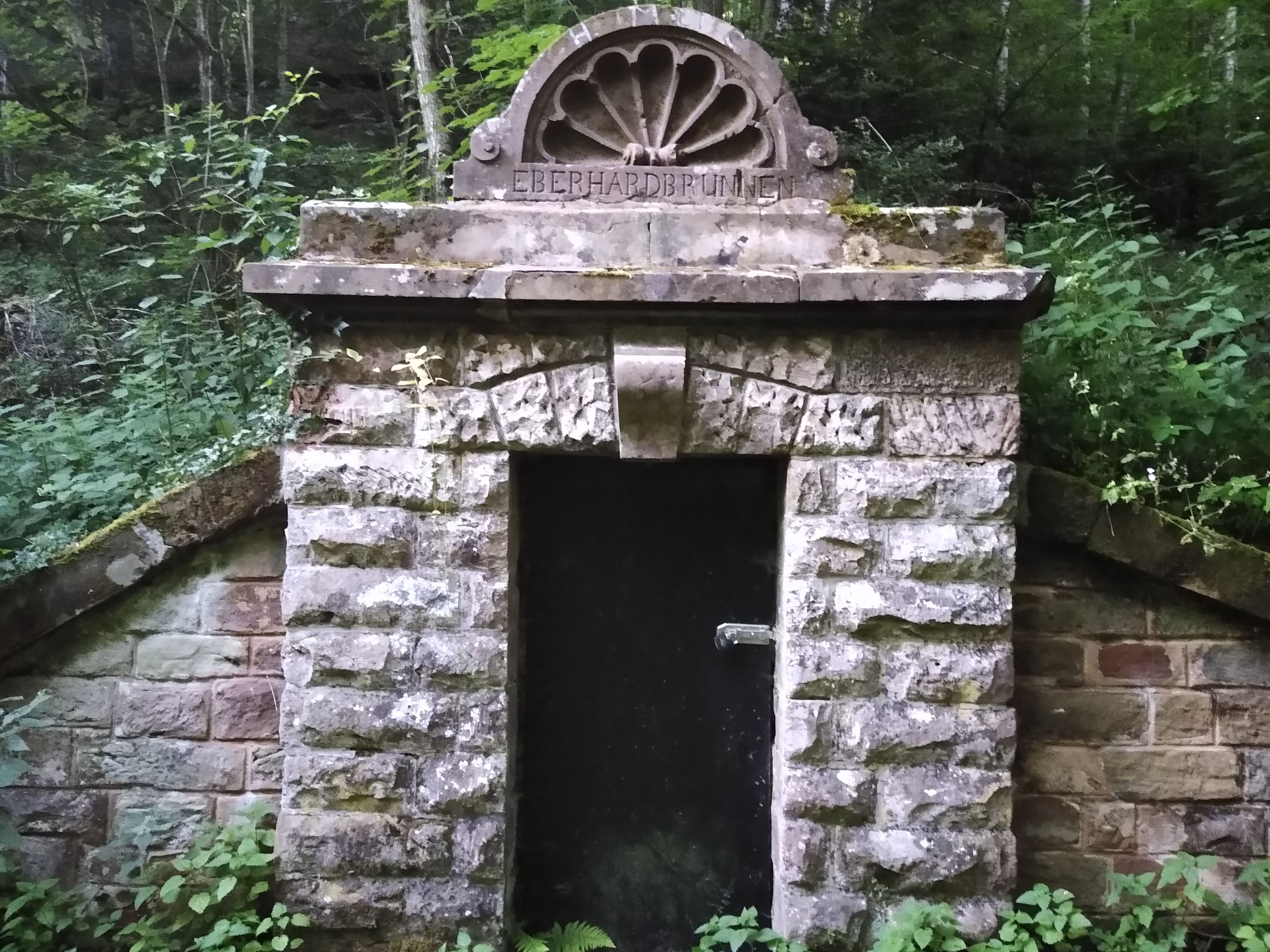
Erhard Well in Einöd (Saar)

The snake caves serve as a natural shelter for wild animals, such as foxes, badgers, and bats. In the war years 1944/5, however, they also served as a shelter for humans. In the 1950s, the snake caves became a tourist attraction and an electrical light system was installed. However, because of continued vandalism the caves were closed.

The Schlangenhöhler Weg passes through this area and some of the cave exits are visible when hiking on the path. The trail is part of a hiking network and quite popular as it passes a ski and hiking cabin and a Kneipp water health treatment installment, that can be freely used by the public. The Ehrhard Brunnen which was an important well and water reservoir in the early 20th century is on the left side of the path close to the Kneipp installation. The trail follows the Pfänderbach and rises 110 m from the bottom to the top. After reaching the top of the path and exiting the forest, it is only a short distance to the Berghof farm.

== Demographics ==
According to statistics provided by the city of Homburg (August 2021), the quarter of Einöd has a total of 3,392 inhabitants. The three fractions Einöd, Ingweiler, and Schwarzenacker have 2,636, 152, and 604 inhabitants respectively. After Erbach and Homburg, Einöd is currently the third largest district in the city of Homburg contributing 7.8% out of the overall population of 42.843 inhabitants.

== Churches ==
Currently there are two church buildings in the fraction Einöd, the Protestant Apostelkirche and a church building of the Seventh-Day Adventist Church. The Apostelkirche belongs to the Protestant Palatinate Deanery of Zweibrücken. The church was built between 1752 CE and 1753 CE as an extension of an earlier chapel. In 1808 CE, there was a further extension of the church which was followed by a reconstruction 1868. In the course of this reconstruction, the present church tower was built. After the Second World War, the church was restored from 1949 to 1950. Currently the church building is listed as a cultural monument.

In the fraction Schwarzenacker there are also two church buildings, the Roman Catholic Church Maria Geburt and the Protestant Christuskirche. Maria Geburt was built between 1960 and 1962. Canon Otto Wokart laid the foundation stone on 25 June 1961. The church was consecrated on 12 August 1962 by bishop Dr. Isidore Markus Emanuel. Since 1 January 2016, Maria Geburt is a parish church of the Holy Cross in Homburg and includes the fractions and districts of Schwarzenacker, Schwarzenbach, Einöd, Wörschweiler and Ingweiler. The Patronal Feast of the church, is the feast of the Nativity of the Blessed Virgin Mary, on the 8th of September. The Protestant Christuskirche is the parish church of Schwarzenbach, Schwarzenacker and Wörschweiler and is part of the Protestant Palatinate Deanery of Homburg. The foundation stone was laid in June 1958 and the inauguration took place on 27 November 1960.

== Politics ==
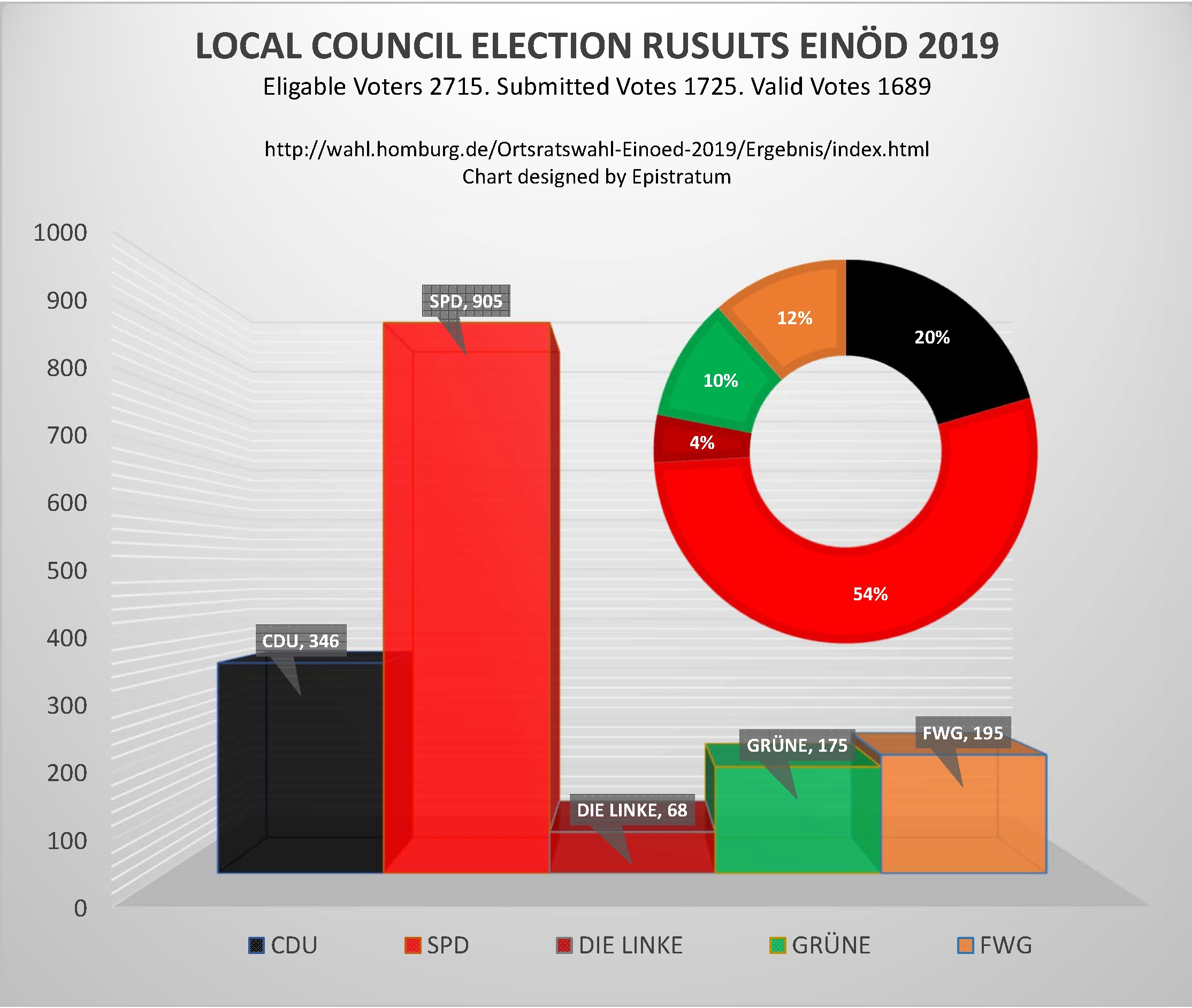
Election Results Local District Council 2019 Einöd (Saar)

Einöd has the status of a municipal district with its own district head and local council. The district council supports the city council in an advisory function but does not have voting rights.

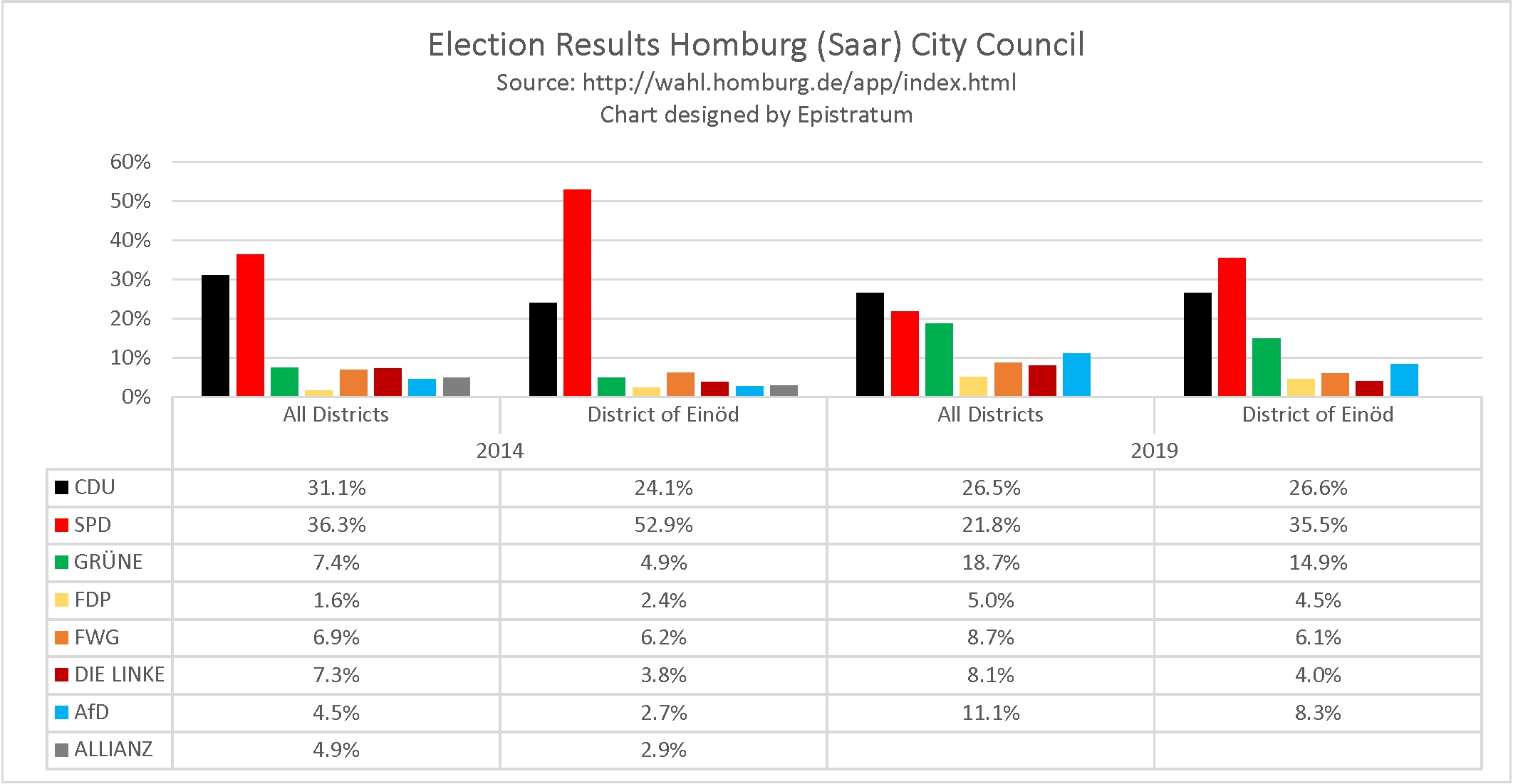
Election Results of Homburg (Saar) City Council

Similar to the elections in previous cycles the SPD won the elections in 2019 with an absolute majority. In the city council elections the CDU became the majority party whereas the SPD maintained its majority in Einöd. Dr.med. Karl Schuberth (SPD) has been the council head of the district of Einöd since 2004.

== Transport ==
Einöd is easily accessible by car, bus and train. A junction near the village gives access to the A8 autobahn. The railway station provides easy and efficient access to nearby towns such as Pirmasens and the capital city of the State Saarbrücken, but there is currently no direct service to Homburg. However, there are plans to reconstruct the rail link from Homburg and thus extend commuter line S1 from Rhein Neckar to Zweibrücken, passing through Homburg and Einöd. Two bus routes connect Einöd, Saar-Mobil with a half-hour frequency, and DB Regio Mitte with an hourly frequency.

== Notable people ==
- Friedrich Burger (1879–1939), State assembly representative of Bavaria
- Gertrud Wetzel (1914–1994), State assembly representative of Rhineland Palatinate
- Erni Deutsch-Einöder (1917–1997), Writer
- Georg Hüssler (1921–2013), Roman Catholic Priest
- Horst Ehrmantraut (* 1955), Football Player and National Football Coach

== Gallery ==
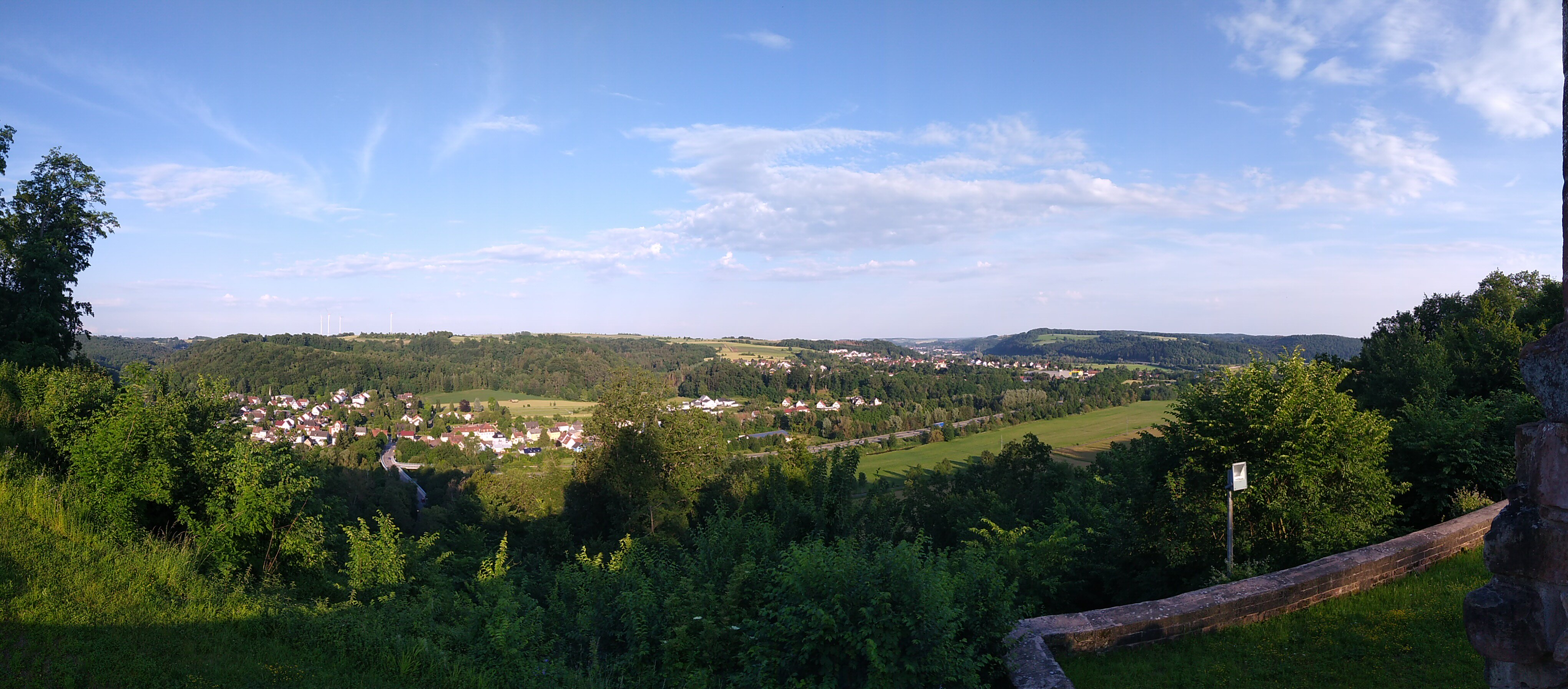

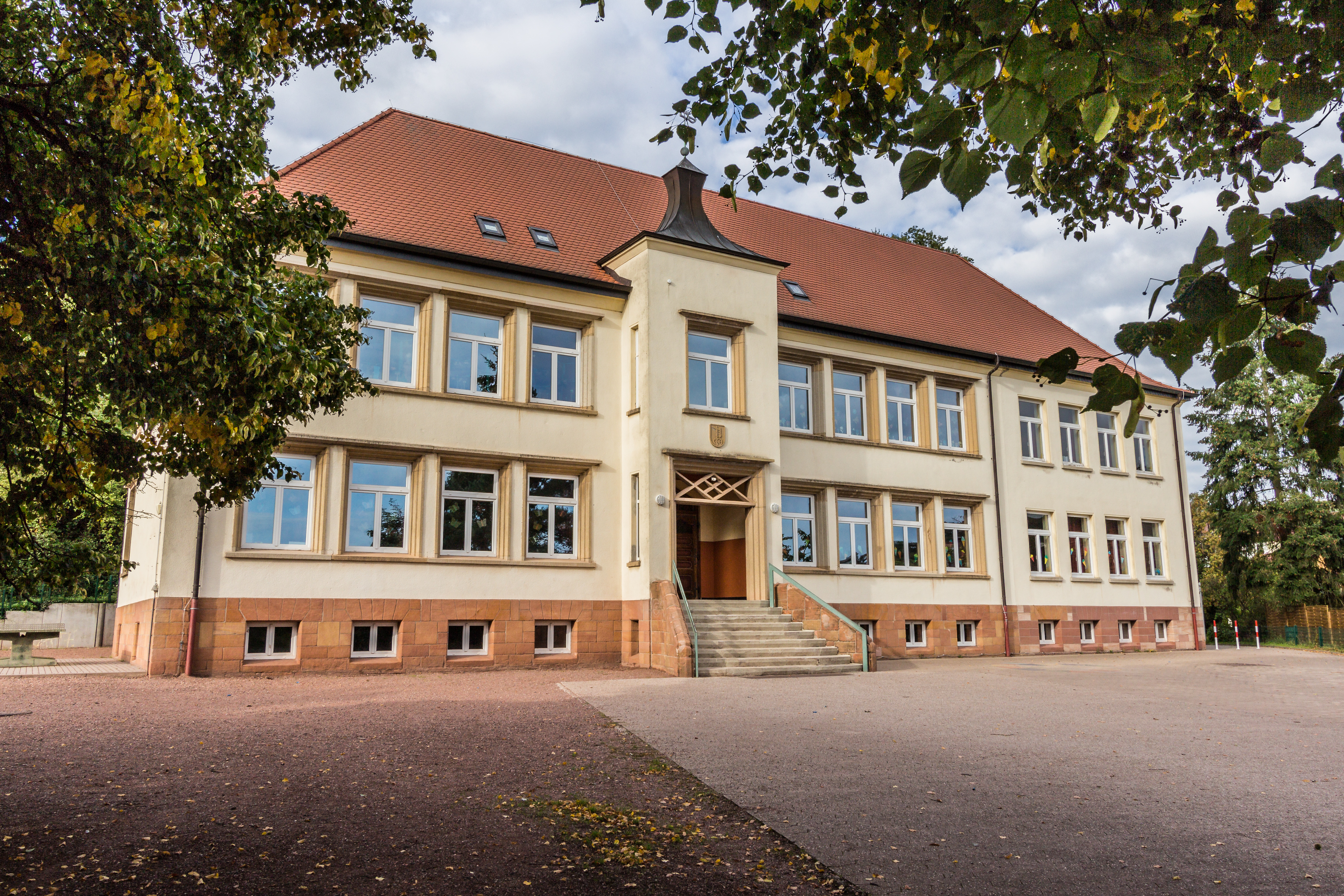

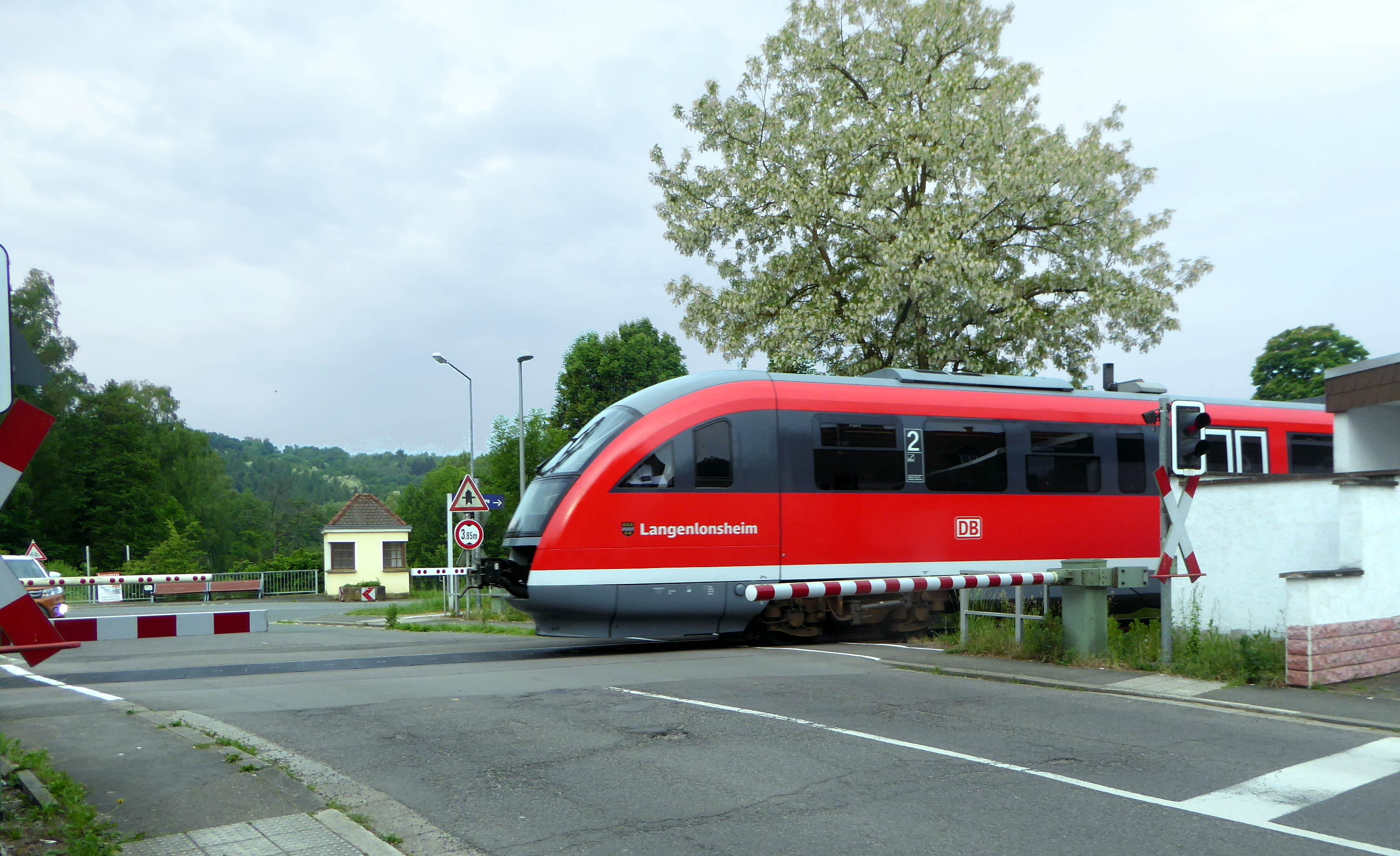

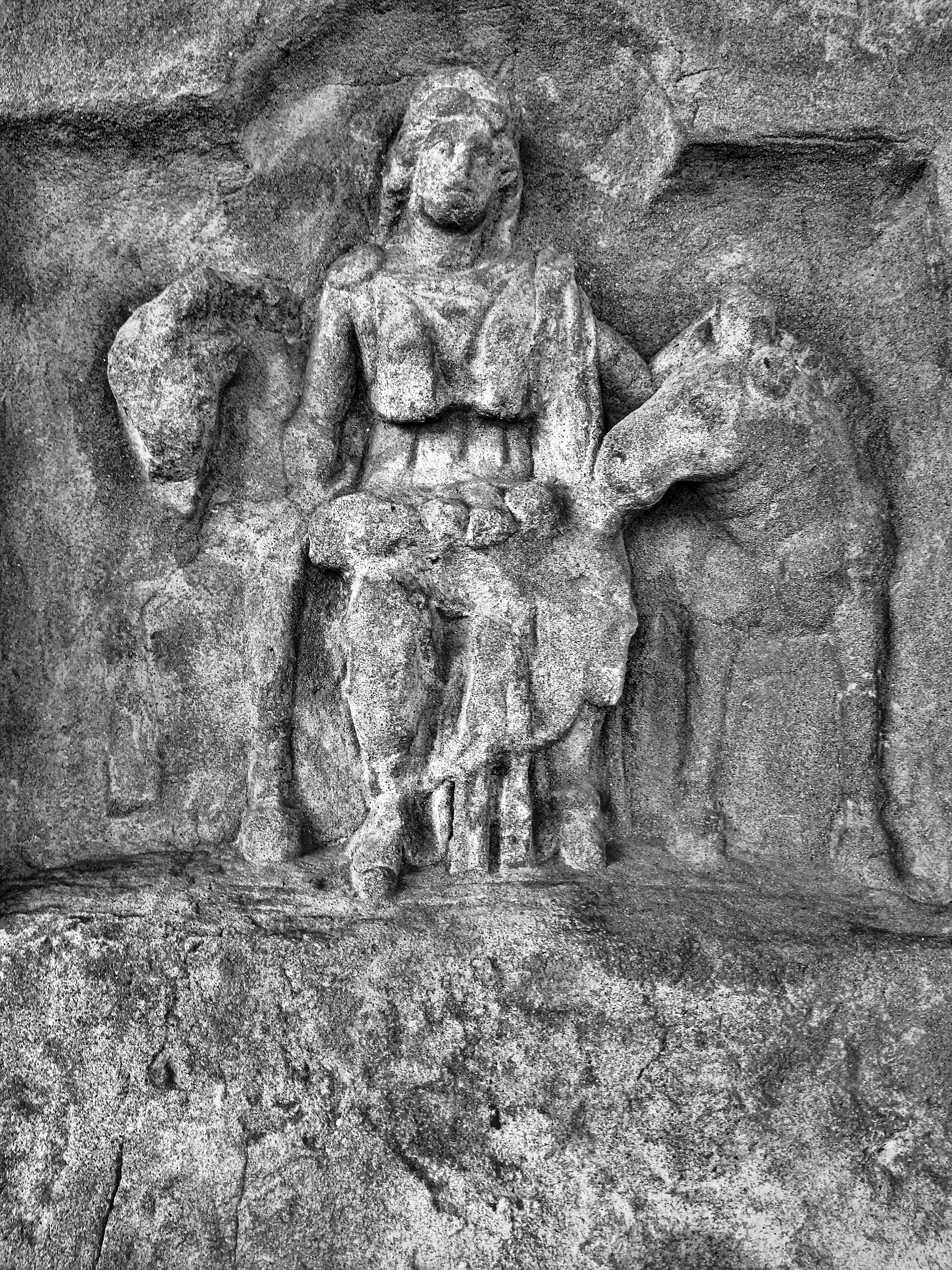

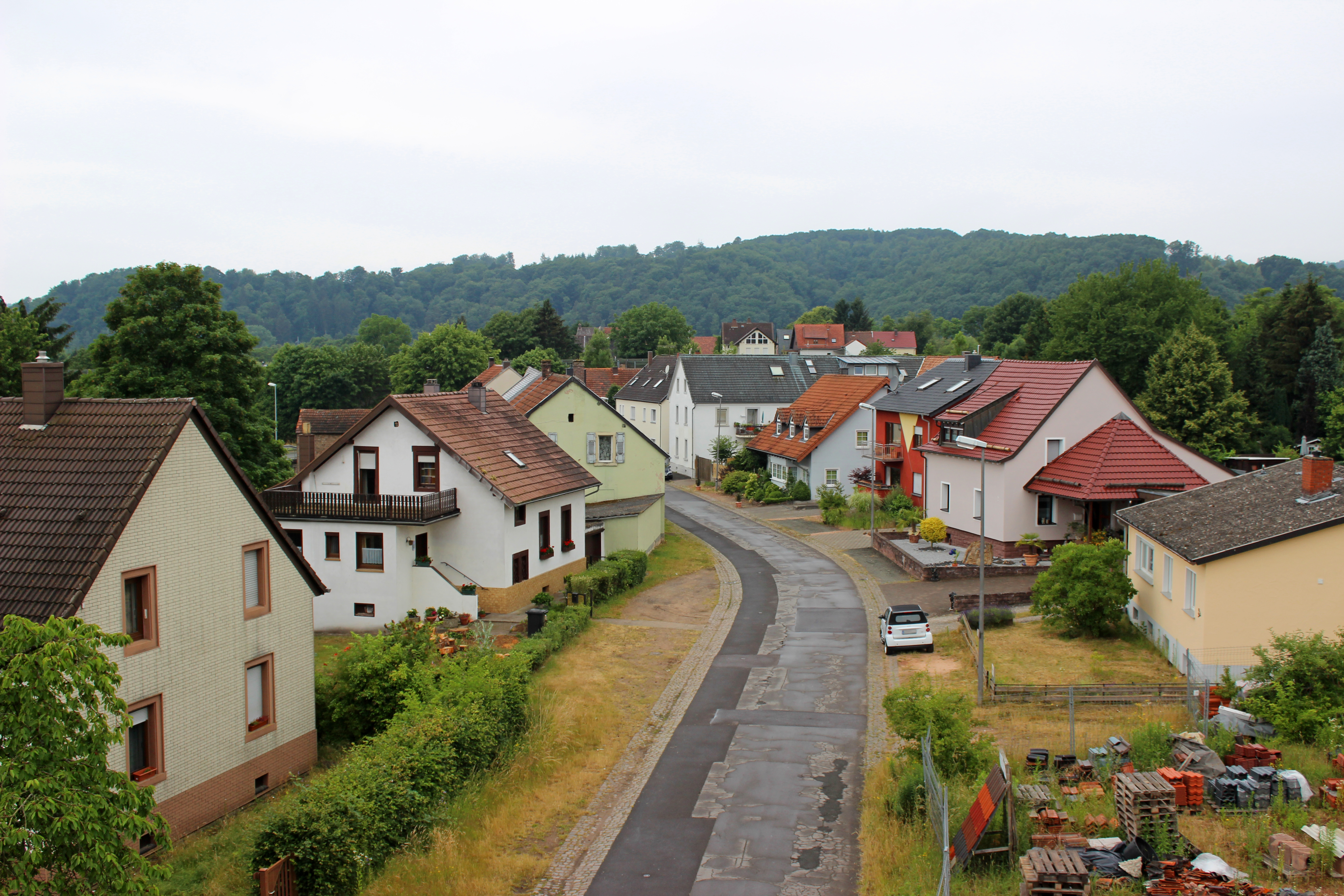

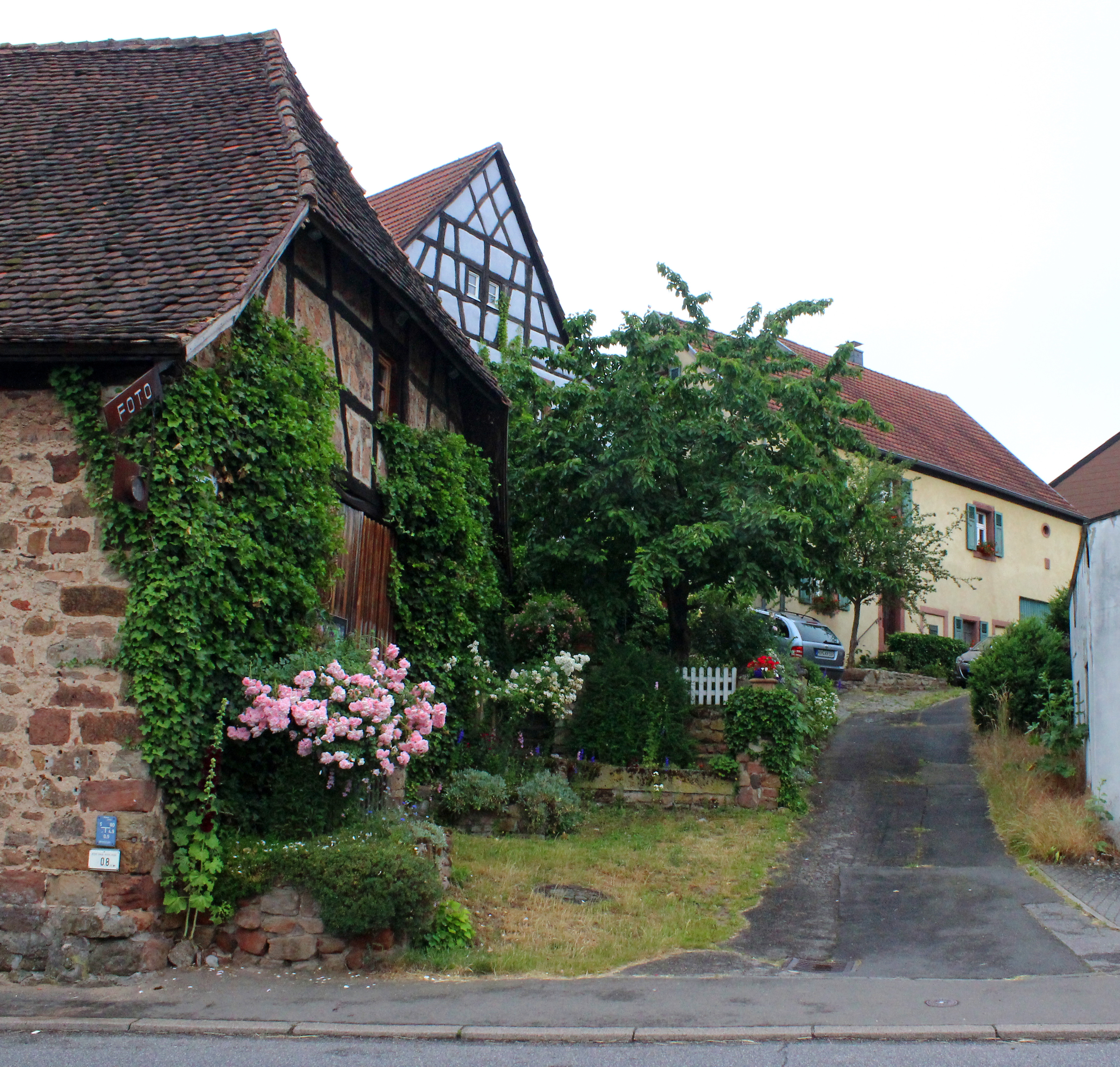
