= Clausensee =

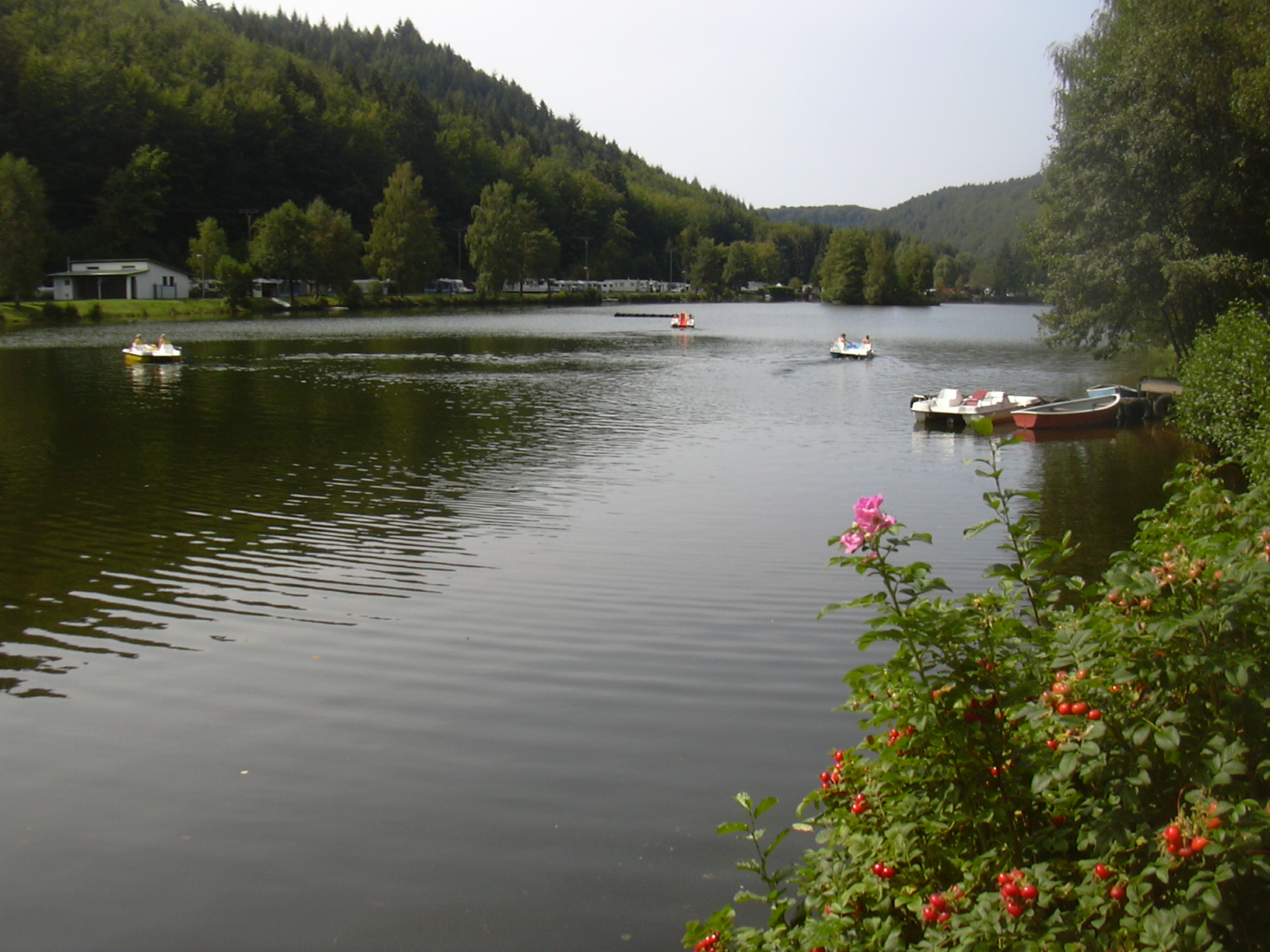
- The Clausensee from the east (in the direction of flow of the Schwarzbach)

- Location within Rhineland-Palatinate
- Location: Western Palatinate, Rhineland-Palatinate, Germany
- Coordinates: 49°16′30″N 7°43′03″E
- Type: reservoir
- Max. length: 450 metres (1,480 ft)
- Max. width: 90 metres (300 ft)
- Surface area: 4.5 hectares (11 acres)
- Max. depth: 5 metres (16 ft)

The Clausensee is a reservoir in the Schwarzbach valley in the western Palatine Forest in the German state of Rhineland-Palatinate.

== Geography ==
The Clausensee lies about ten kilometres east of the B 270 federal highway (from Kaiserslautern to Pirmasens) between Waldfischbach-Burgalben and Leimen. The Schwarzbach stream, also known in this section as the Burgalb, flows through the reservoir.

The surrounding hills of the Palatine Forest rise above the lake up to a height of 200 metres: the Großer Hundsberg in the north is 477 metres (1,565 ft) high, the Hesselberg in the southwest is 465 metres (1,526 ft) high, and the Schmaler Kopf in the southeast is 503 metres (1,650 ft) high.

== Properties ==
The lake is about 450 metres (1,480 ft) long and 90 metres (300 ft) wide. Its total area is 4.5 hectares (11 acres). In the middle of the lake, which is up to 5 metres (16 ft) metres deep, is an island. The water quality is assessed as "better than average".

== Tourism ==
The lake is used for tourism purposes. By the shore is a campsite and an unsupervised beach. On the last weekend in July there is an annual lake festival. Sights around the lake are described in the German article on the Schwarzbach valley.
