= Schwarzbach (Blies) =

River in Germany

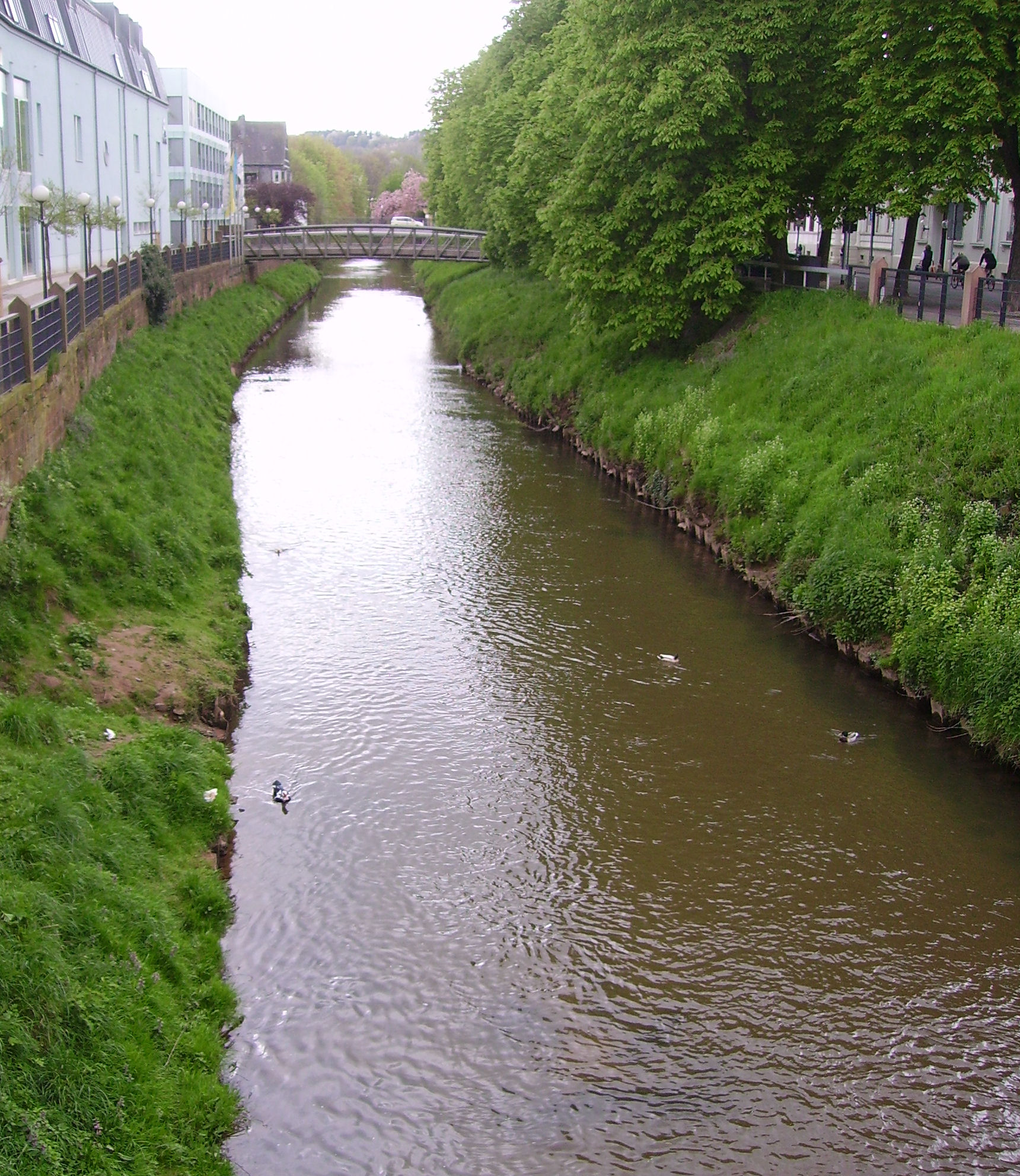
- The Schwarzbach in Zweibrücken

Location
- Country: Germany
- States: Rhineland-Palatinate; Saarland

Physical characteristics
- Source
  - location: Palatinate Forest
  - elevation: 500 m (1,600 ft)
- Mouth
  - location: Confluence with Blies near Einöd
  - coordinates: 49°15′55″N 7°18′26″E
  - elevation: 220 m (720 ft)
- Length: 50 km (31 mi)
- Basin size: 1,151 km^{2} (444 sq mi)
- Discharge
  - average: 10.4 m^{3}/s (370 cu ft/s)

Basin features
- Progression: Blies→ Saar→ Moselle→ Rhine→ North Sea
- Tributaries
  - left: Ramschelbach, Schleifenbächel, Rauschenbach, Dietersbach, Rodalb, Wahlbach, Horn
  - right: Hahnenseybach, Hundsbächel, Dinkelsbächel, Moosalb, Wallhalb, Wiesbach, Stambach, Schöltenbach, Bombach

The Schwarzbach (German pronunciation: [ˈʃvaʁtsˌbax]) is a river in southwestern Germany, left tributary of the Blies. Its source is in the Palatinate Forest, near Trippstadt. It flows through the states Rhineland-Palatinate and Saarland. Towns along its course are Waldfischbach-Burgalben, Contwig and Zweibrücken. After 50 km (31 mi), it flows into the Blies in Homburg-Einöd.

== Tributaries and course ==
The two headwaters of the Schwarzbach, the first 16 km (9.9 mi) of which is also known as Burgalb, rise on western side of the watershed in the middle of the Palatinate Forest, just south of the hamlet Johanniskreuz, at an altitude of about 500 m. One spring is located on the southern slope of the 528 m high Mount Steinberg. The other spring is three kilometers away, on the southwest side of the 609 m (1,998 ft) high Mount Eschkopf. The two headwaters meet after about 4 km (2.5 mi).

The river then flows past Leimen into the Schwarzbach valley. It takes up the Hundsbächel and the Dinkelsbächel from the right and the Rauschenbach from the left, before reaching the Clausensee reservoir. Then it flows to Waldfischbach-Burgalben where it takes up the Moosalb from the right. At the hamlet of Biebermühle, it takes up the Rodalb from the left, then flows to Thaleischweiler-Fröschen. Below this twin village, it takes up the Wallhalb from the right. It then flows past Rieschweiler-Mühlbach to Dellfeld, where the Schwarzbach valley ends and the river flows into the Blies valley. It flows past Contwig to Zweibrücken, where it takes up the Wiesbach from the right, followed by the Horn from the left. It then flows across the state line into Saarland and into the Blies in Einöd, a district of Homburg, which in turn flows into the Saar 55 km (34 mi) further downstream.

At the confluence, the Schwarzbach carries twice as much water as the Blies (10.4 m^{3}/s [370 cu ft/s] versus 5 m^{3}/s [180 cu ft/s]). It is also some 10 percent longer. Since the Blies, in turn, carries slightly more water than the Saar, it could be argued that hydrologically speaking, the Schwarzbach is the main headwater of the Saar river system.

== Tourism ==
Part of the central Schwarzbach is followed by the German Shoe Road. This holiday route was established in 1977 in order to commemorate that in the early 19th century the region surrounding Pirmasens was the heart of the German shoe industry.

== Gallery ==
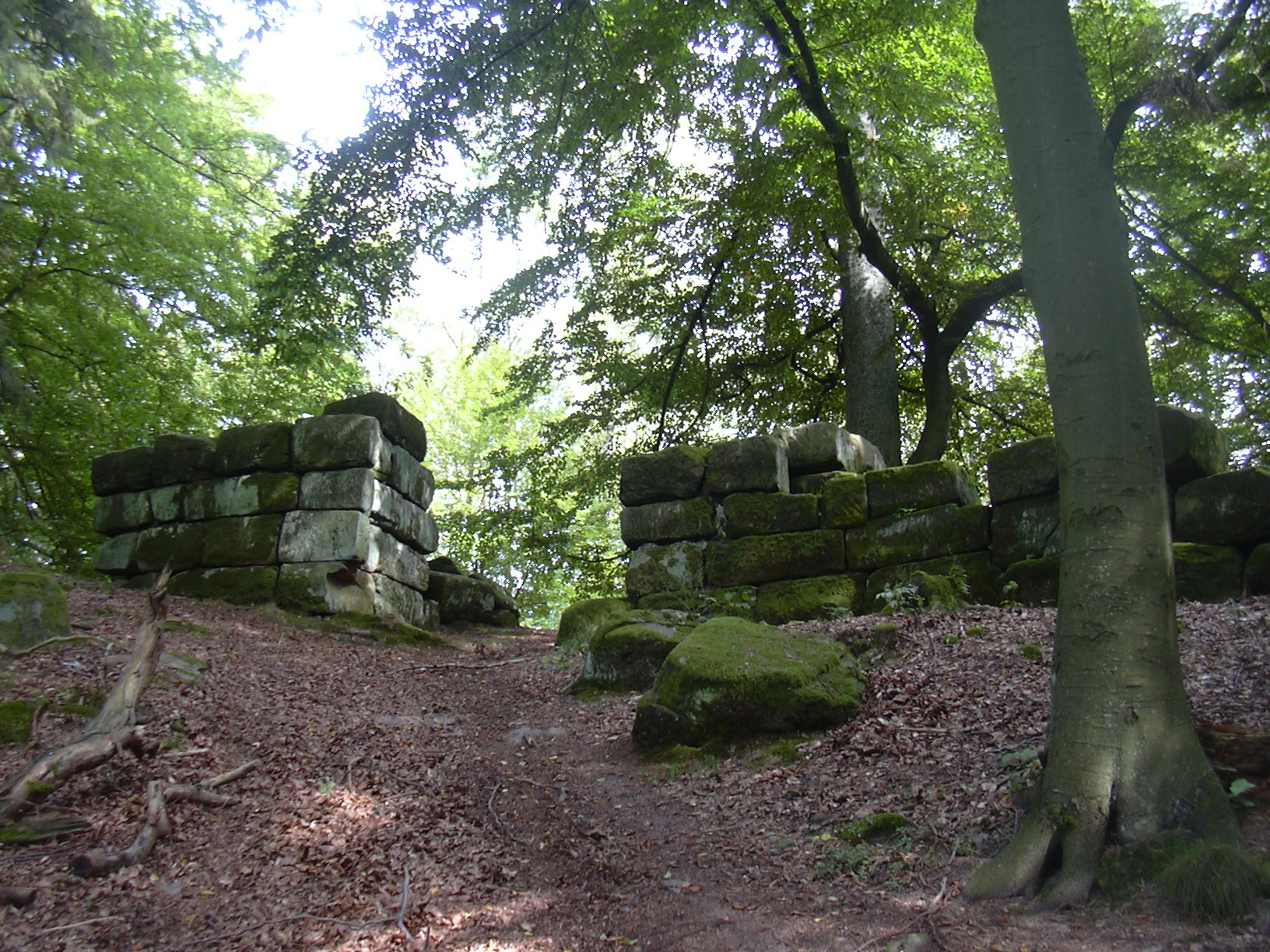
Heidelsburg Castle, west gate

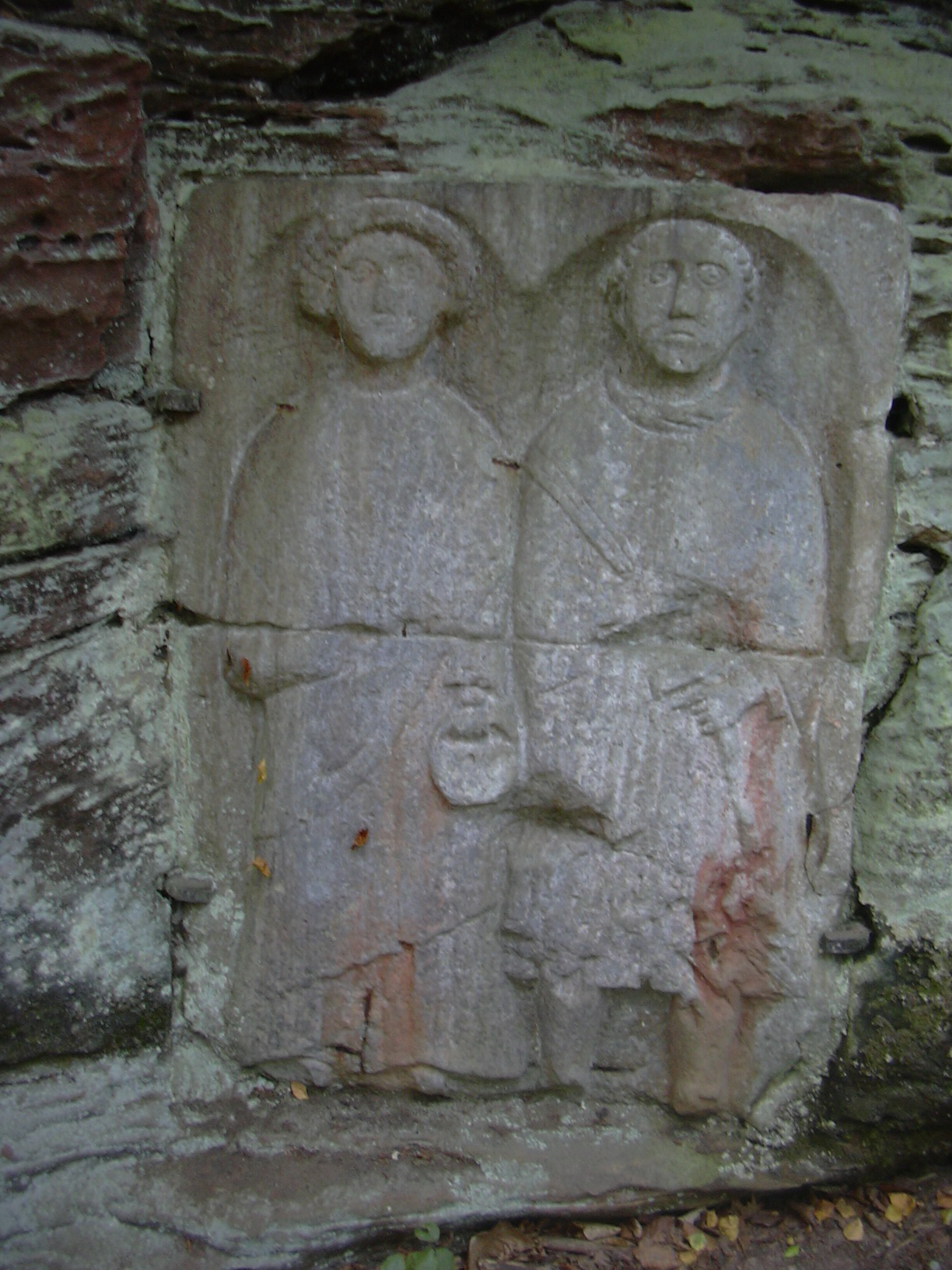
Grave relief of Saltuarius

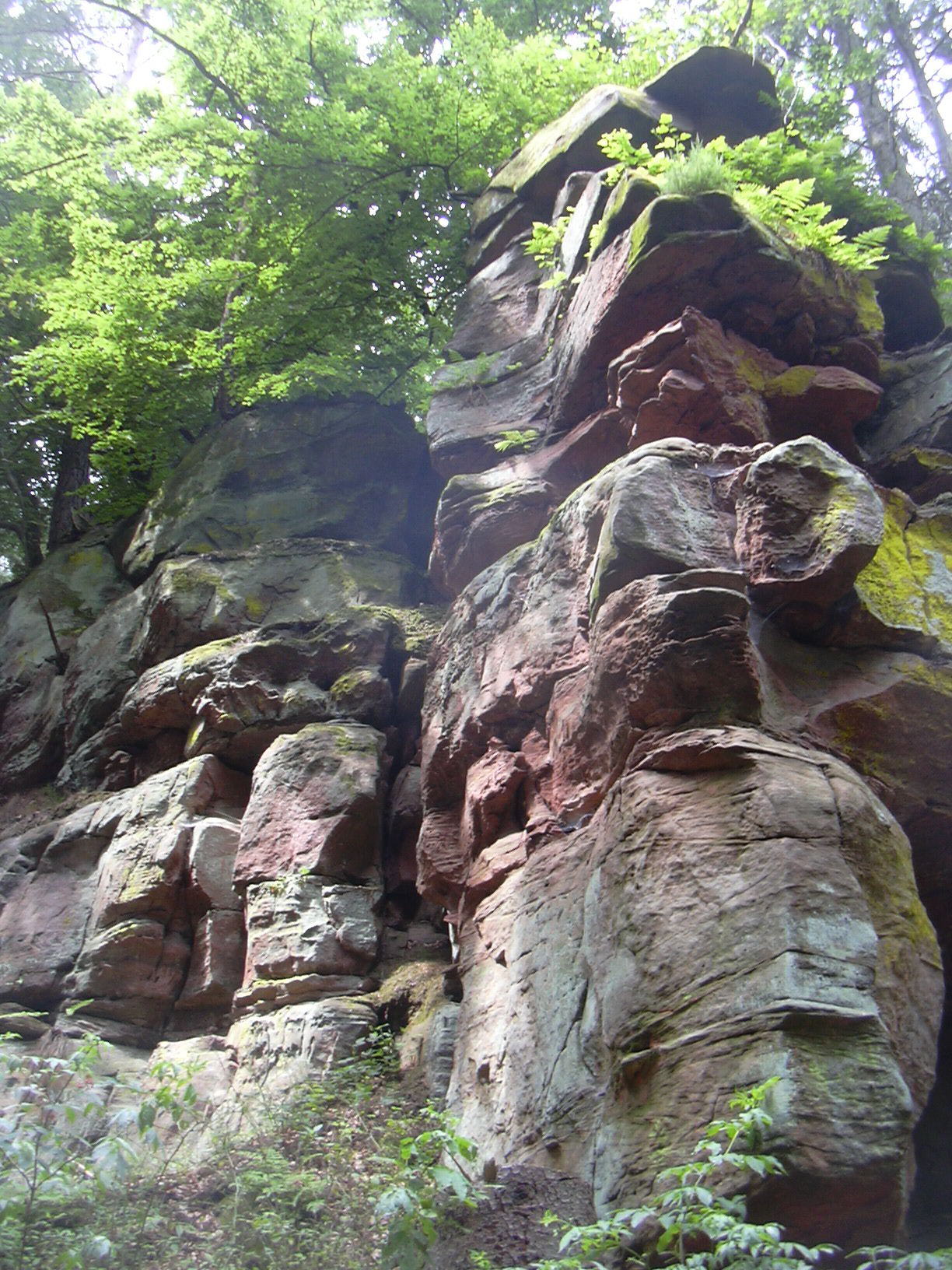
Rock formation at the Heidelsburg Castle

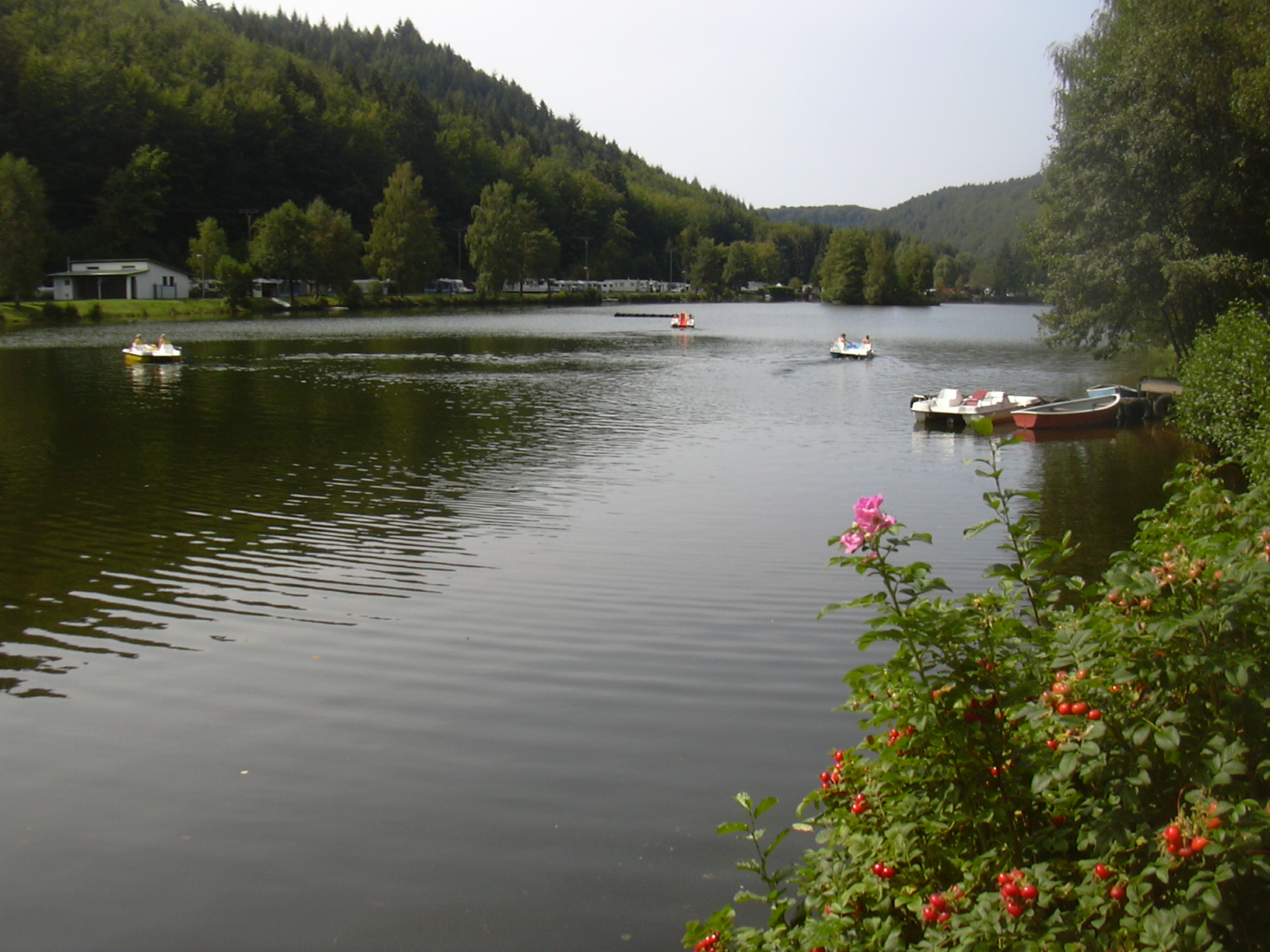
Clausensee viewed to the West (in direction the Schwarzbach flows)

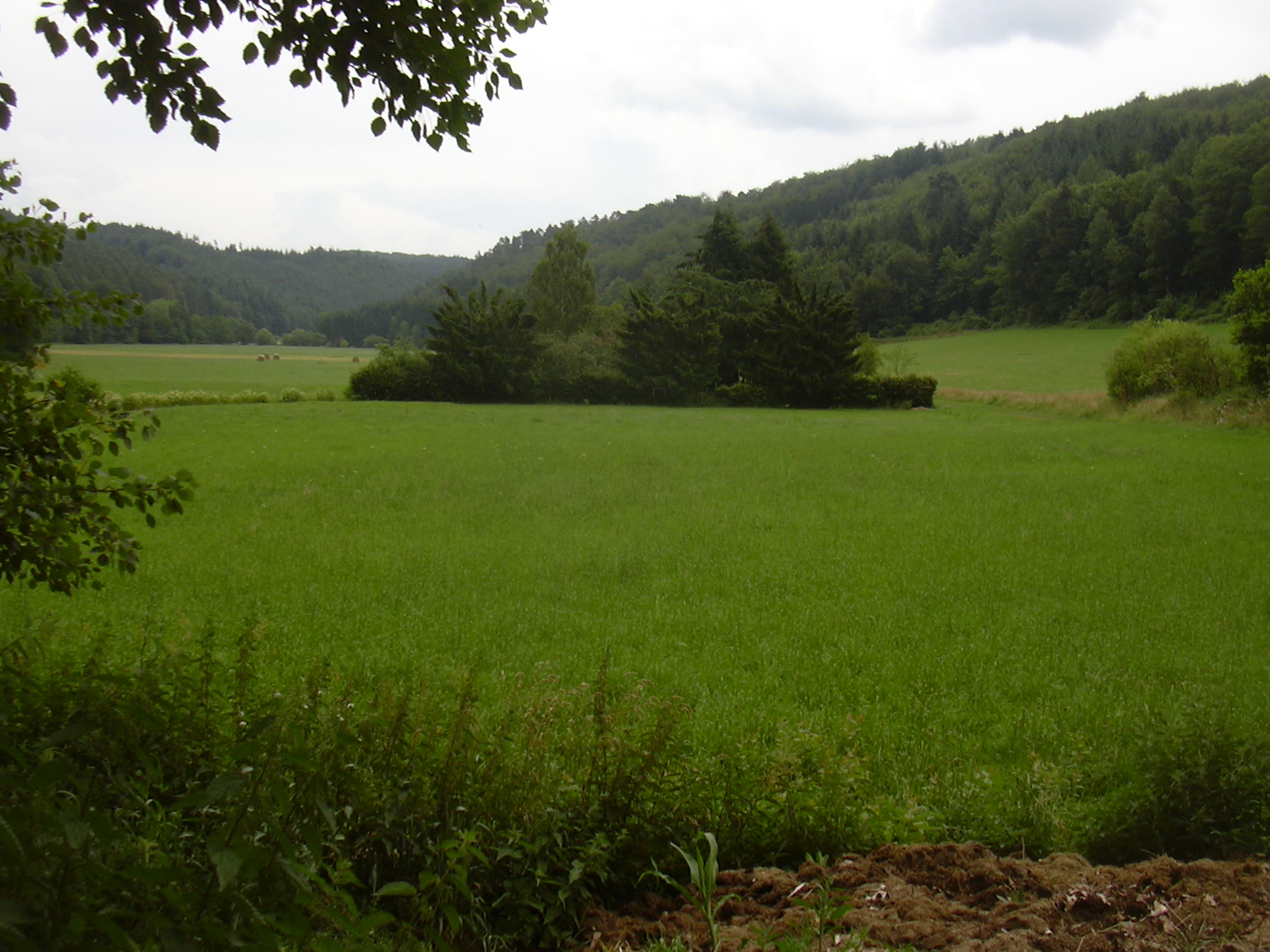
Schwarzbach valley at Waldfischbach-Burgalben

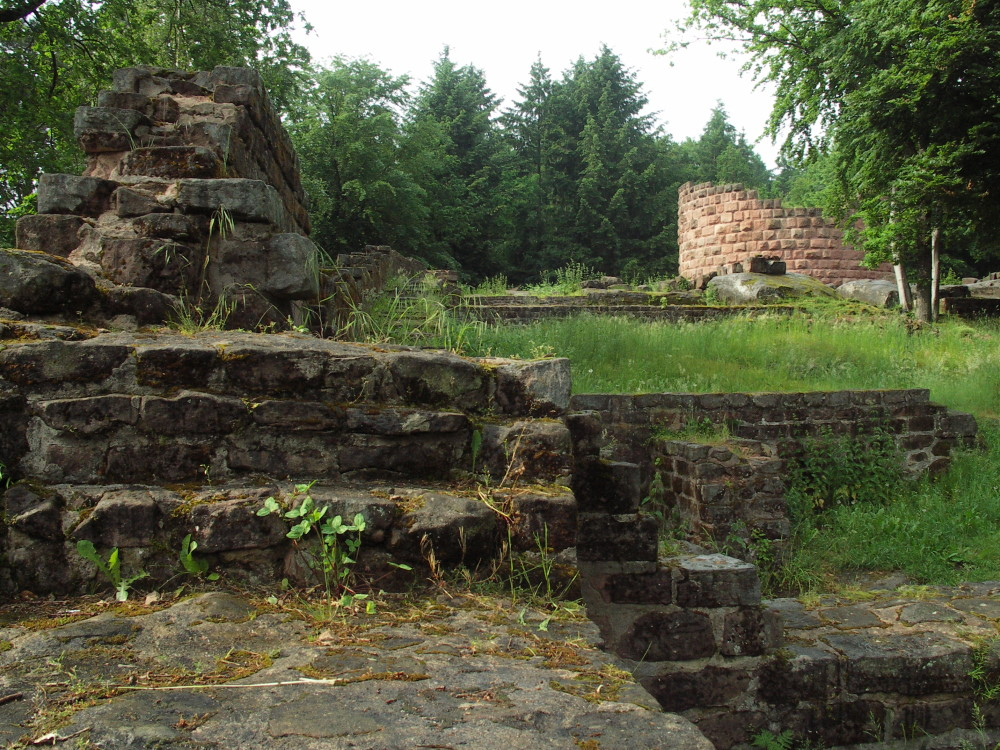
Steinenschloss Castle

== See also ==
- List of rivers of Saarland
- List of rivers of Rhineland-Palatinate
