= Rodalb =

River in Germany

- The Rodalb east of Rodalben

Location
- Country: Germany
- State: Rhineland-Palatinate
- Reference no.: DE: 264264

Physical characteristics
- Source
  - location: Near Pirmasens
  - coordinates: 49°08′44″N 7°35′30″E
  - elevation: 380 m above sea level (NN)
- Mouth
  - location: By the Biebermühle mill into the Schwarzbach
  - coordinates: 49°15′52″N 7°36′13″E
  - elevation: 243 m above sea level (NN)
- Length: 25.71 km (15.98 mi)
- Basin size: 116.205 km^{2} (44.867 sq mi)

Basin features
- Progression: Schwarzbach→ Blies→ Saar→ Moselle→ Rhine→ North Sea
- Landmarks: Large towns: Pirmasens; Small towns: Rodalben; Villages: Lemberg, Ruppertsweiler, Münchweiler
- Tributaries
  - right: Merzalbe

The Rodalb (German pronunciation: [ˈʁoːtʔalp]), also called the Rodalbe, is a stream, just under 26 km (16 mi) long, in West Palatinate in the German state of Rhineland-Palatinate. It is an orographically left tributary of the Schwarzbach.

== Course ==
The Rodalb rises in the southwestern Palatinate Forest, south of the town of Pirmasens near the hamlet of Rodalberhof at a height of about 380 metres above sea level. To begin with it flows northeast, passing the villages of Lemberg and Ruppertsweiler. It then swings north, accompanies the B 10 federal highway, 2 kilometres away, and flows through Münchweiler. At Riegelbrunnerhof (a district of Münchweiler), it picks up the waters of the Merzalbe, its largest tributary, from the right and changes direction once again to head northwest, passing through the little town of Rodalben. Near the hamlet of Biebermühle it discharges into the Schwarzbach from the left.

== Sights ==
- Lemberg Castle, built around 1200, in ruins since 1689
- Rodalben Rock Trail with a length - depending on the source – of 43 or 45 km
- Bärenhöhle, "Bear Cave", the largest natural rock cave in the Palatinate region
- Bruderfelsen rocks, symbol of the town of Rodalben

== See also ==
- List of rivers of Rhineland-Palatinate
