= Heidelsburg =

Castle ruins in Germany

Coordinates: 49°16′3″N 7°41′31″E

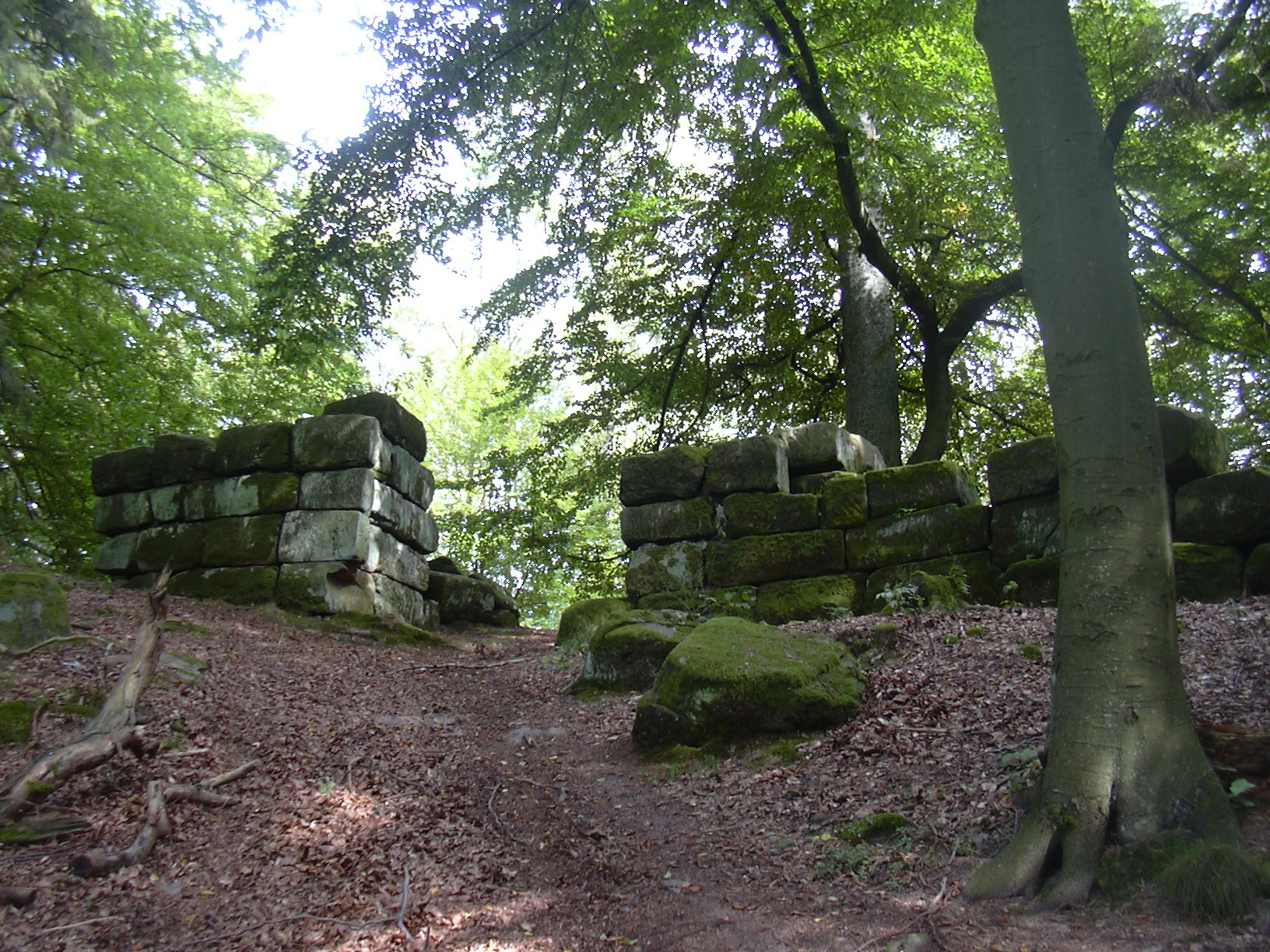
West gate of the Heidelsburg with original Roman ashlars

The Heidelsburg, also called the Bunenstein, is an old fortification in the western Palatine Forest in the German state of Rhineland-Palatinate that goes back at least to the days of the Roman Empire. Today only the remains of two gates, together with their steps, the castle walls and a cistern have survived.

== Geography ==
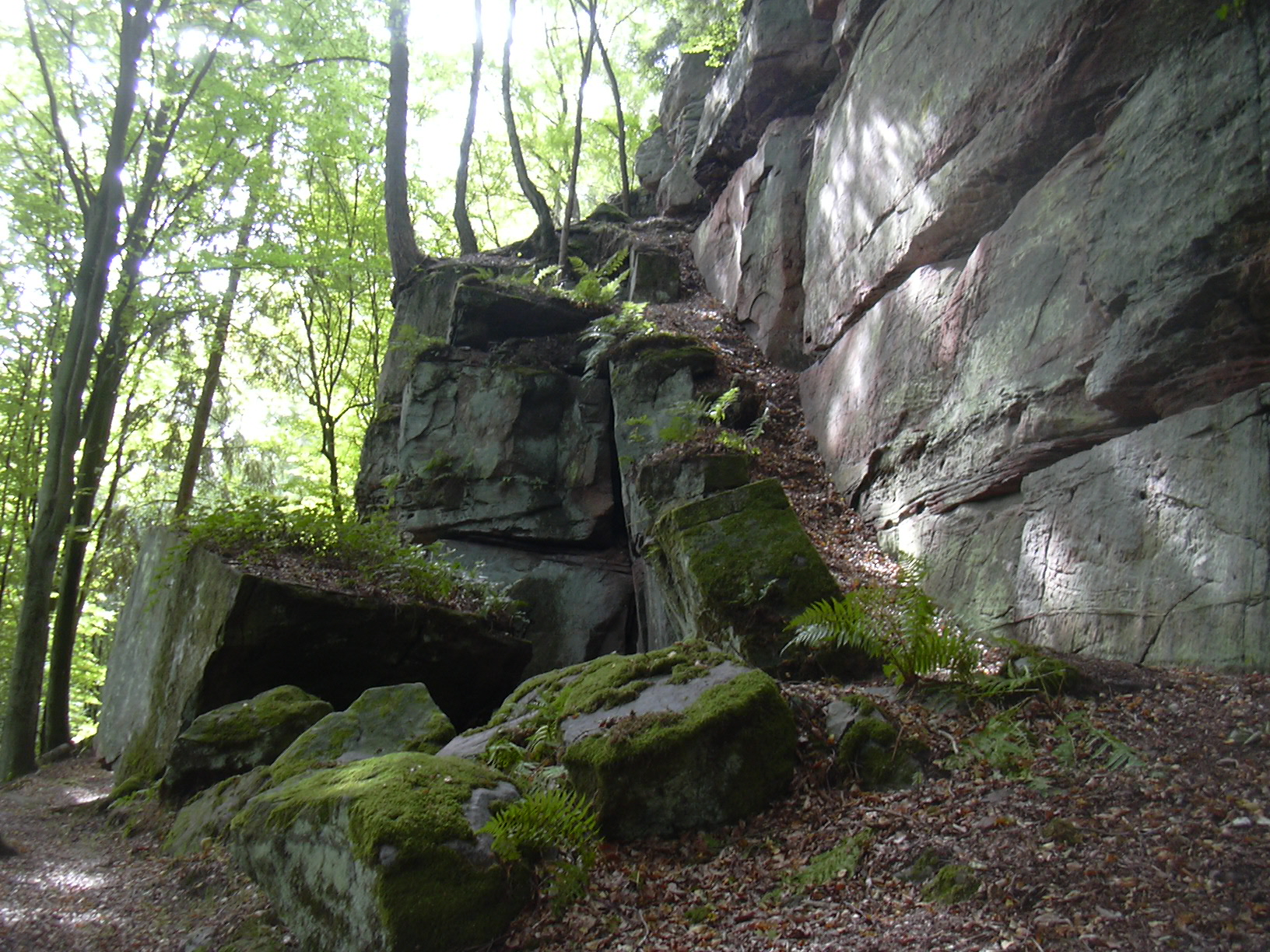
Rocky path near the Heidelsburg

The castle ruins lie 3 kilometres southeast of Waldfischbach-Burgalben on a rocky ridge of the Drei-Sommer-Berg at a height of 340 metres above sea level (NN) above the valley of Schwarzbachtal.

The Heidelsburg cannot be accessed by car, but there is a waymarked forest walk starting at the Galgenberghaus ("Gallows Hill House") car park near Waldfischbach-Burgalben (approximately 4 km, duration about one hour), Several well-signed paths of varying difficulty and length run from the Sommerdelle car park in the Schwarzbachtal valley to the Heidelsburg. Most of the route is on gravelled or small forest paths which, depending the season and usage, can be overgrown.

== History ==
According to finds of Roman coins which came to light in the 1970s, the Heidelsburg was built between the 2nd century A.D. (the time of Emperor Hadrian) and 351 (the time of the Germanic invasions). Based on the location and shape of the site as well as a find of Gallic coins, historians believe it is possible that there may have been an earlier structure going back to the Celts, with an origin of around 100 B.C. It is also possible that the castle was extended during the late Carolingian period, as suggested by certain features in the construction of the chamber gate. In a 1355 document, a rock formation is named as the Bunenstein and recorded as being situated at the same spot as the Heidelsburg. It was sold by Count Arnold of Homburg to Count Walram of Zweibrücken. The latter wanted to build a castle on the rocks, but this came to nothing.

The actual name of the castle has not survived. The name "Heidelsburg" is related etymologically to Heiden ("heathens") and first appeared in the Middle Ages by which time the castle had been a ruin for several centuries. A local source from Waldfischbach mentions the ruins around 1600.

In 1990 the site went into the possession of the state Forestry and Castle department of the Office for Heritage Monuments.

== Site ==
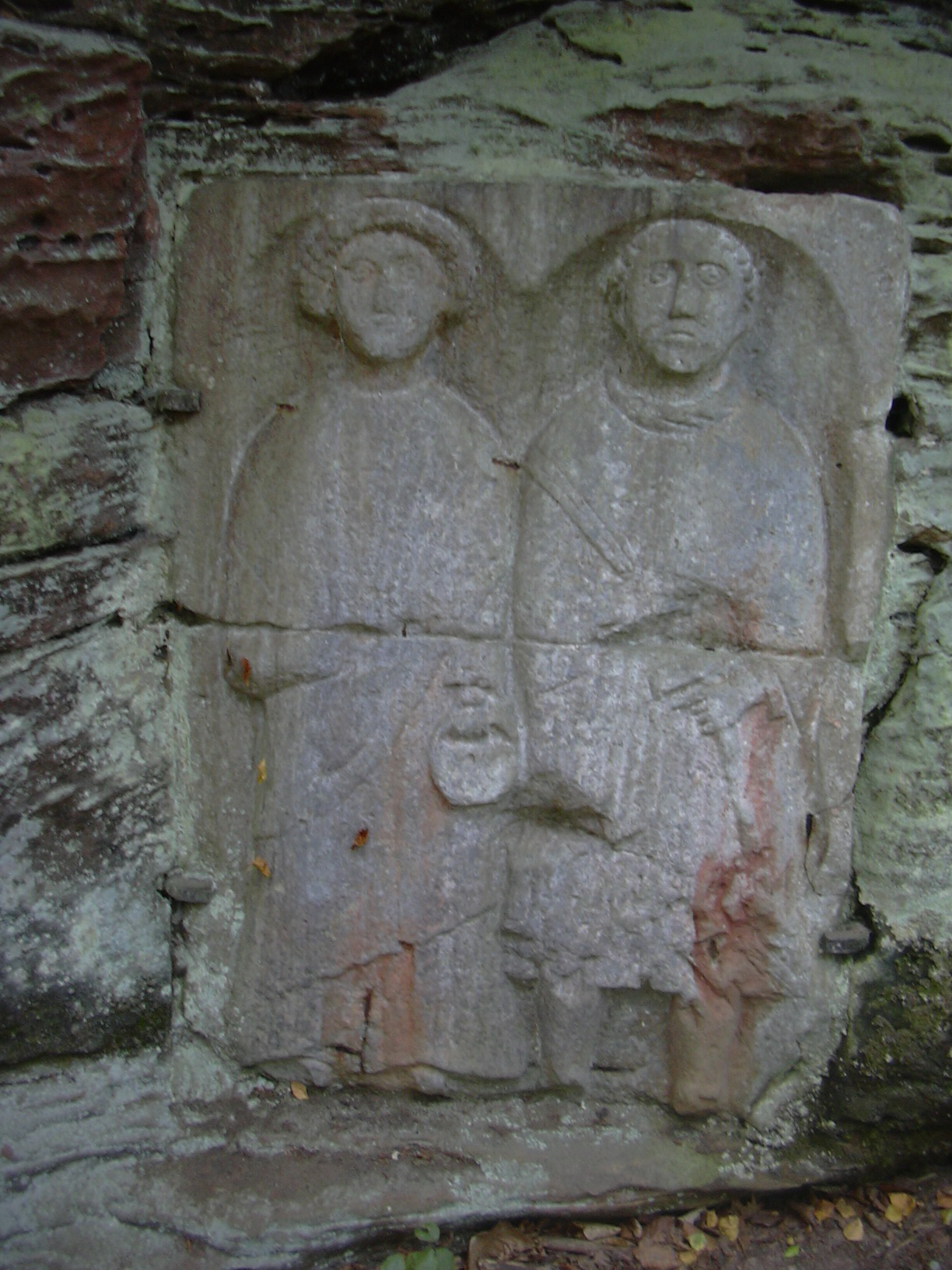
The Saltuarius and his wife (replica of a gravestone)

According to historians, Christian Mehlis (1883) and Friedrich Sprater (1927/28), who conducted the excavations in two stages, there was an oval walled enclosure of solid ashlars on the ridge that drops steeply into the Schwarzbachtal valley. This enclosure made good use of natural bunter sandstone rock faces and reinforced an older structure of wooden posts. Within this wall was the Roman camp which had two gates, one at the eastern end and one at the western end.

Today only remnants of the defensive wall can be made out. The west gate was rebuilt by Sprater in the late 1920s from the heavily moss-covered original ashlars. The function of a depression in the area of the ring wall is unclear; it may have been a cistern.

In the local history museum at Waldfischbach-Burgalben there is a model of the entire site.

During the first phase of excavation work in the 19th century, a grave slab was uncovered that portrayed a man with an axe and a woman with a basket. The axe was the symbol of a Roman forest manager, the Saltuarius, and an eponymous name suffix, inscribed on the wall, was found in the vicinity along with a corresponding tool. Although there are no written sources detailing whether and to what extent the Romans operating around the Heidelsburg area were actually engaged in forestry, it is nevertheless the oldest known evidence of forest administration in late antiquity on German soil. As a result, tourist promotional material claims the Heidelsburg to be the "oldest forestry office in Germany".

The grave slab is housed today in the History Museum of the Palatinate in Speyer. At the location of the find in the area of the destroyed east wall an 1876 replica was found. The local history museum in Waldfischbach-Burgalben has a wood carving that comes from a local hobby carver.

In addition to coins, shards of Roman pottery and iron tools were found in the area around the castle, which are also displayed in the local history museum.

From the west gate there is a circular path that runs over the beech-covered plateau between the natural rock formations and the remains of the circular wall. The sandy soils are dominated by ferns, heather and blueberries. Individual trees take root in the crevices of the rock faces which are also used by sport climbers as a training area.
