= Western Palatinate =

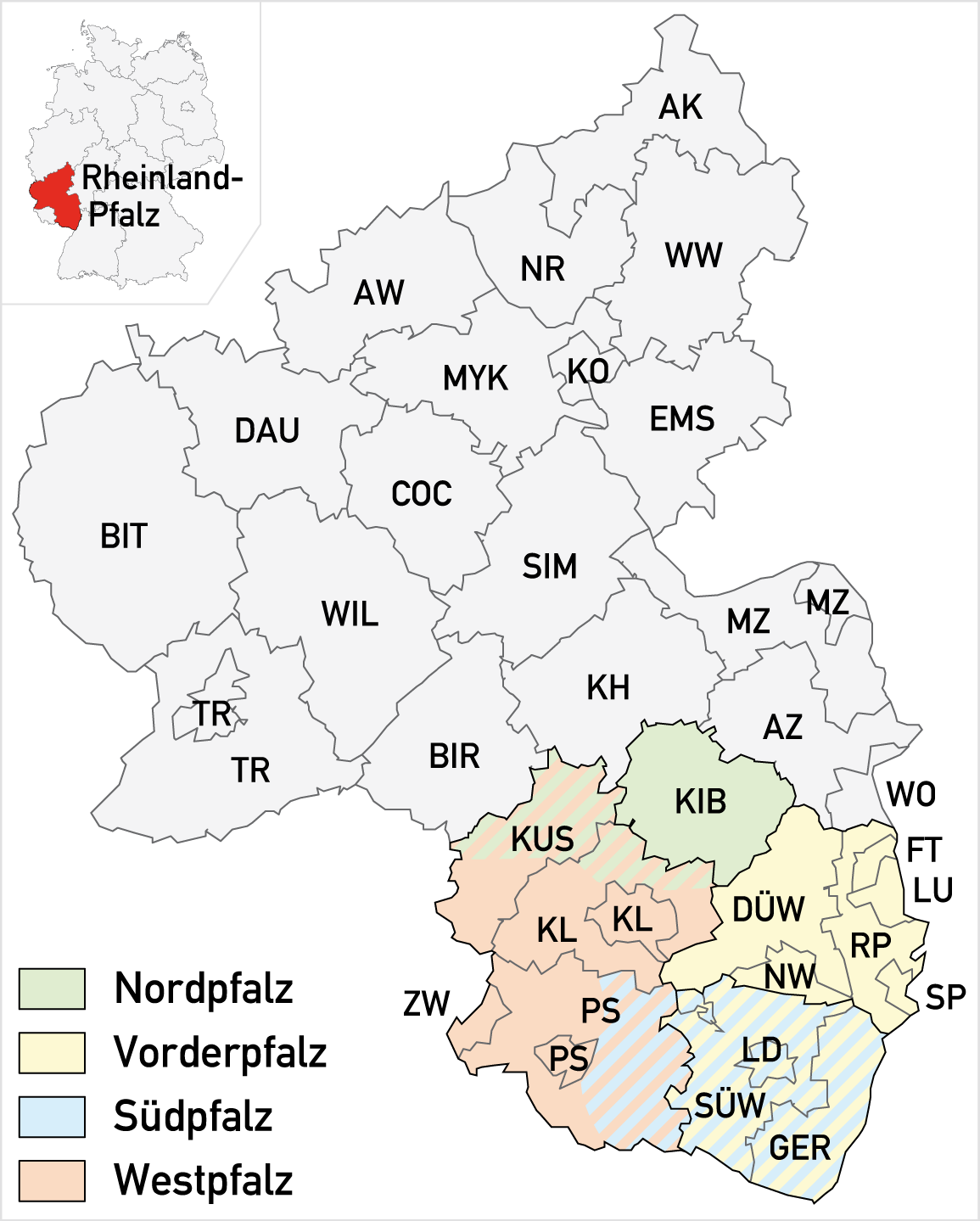
Rhineland-Palatinate with the location of Western Palatinate

Western Palatinate or West Palatinate (German: Westpfalz, pronounced [ˈvɛstˌpfalts]) is a sub-region in the west of the Palatinate, a German cultural and historic region in the state of Rhineland-Palatinate. It includes the western part of the Palatine Forest, the central part of the North Palatine Uplands, the West Palatine Moor and the Westrich Plateau. Its former name of "Further Palatinate" (Hinterpfalz), which emerged during the time of Bavarian rule in 1816 and was viewed by the local population as very discriminatory, is only commonly used in the Anterior Palatinate (Vorderpfalz).

== Geography ==
The following counties and independent towns or cities lie wholly or partly in the Western Palatinate:

- County of Kaiserslautern
- City of Kaiserslautern
- County of Kusel
- Town of Landstuhl
- Town of Pirmasens
- County of Südwestpfalz
- Town of Zweibrücken

The county of Donnersbergkreis and the old counties of Rockenhausen and Kirchheimbolanden were also counted as part of the Western Palatinate in the widest sense, but are often viewed as an independent region (North Palatinate or Nordpfalz).

A different definition also existed for the division of the police force: the Police District of West Palatinate (Polizeipräsidium Westpfalz) looked after just the western part of Donnersbergkreis county (roughly corresponding to the old county of Rockenhausen) as well as the collective municipality of Meisenheim in the county of Bad Kreuznach as well as the above administrative regions.

== Population ==
Almost 550,000 people live in West Palatinate, including around 30,000 foreigners. There are also around 50,000 Americans living in the greater Kaiserslautern area, who are not recorded in the official population statistics. They form the largest US community outside the United States. By far the largest city and the upper center of the region is Kaiserslautern with around 102,000 inhabitants, followed by Pirmasens and Zweibrücken. The following list lists the largest settlements in the region:

Town or city	Status	County	Population (31 December 2017)
Kaiserslautern	Higher level urban centre (Oberzentrum)	independent (kreisfrei)	100,747
Pirmasens	Medium level urban centre (Mittelzentrum)	kreisfrei	40,707
Zweibrücken	Mittelzentrum	kreisfrei	34,275
Eisenberg (Pfalz)	Lower level urban centre (Grundzentrum)	Donnersbergkreis	9,311
Landstuhl	Mittelzentrum	Kaiserslautern	8,811
Kirchheimbolanden	Mittelzentrum	Donnersbergkreis	7,815
Bruchmühlbach-Miesau	Grundzentrum	Kaiserslautern	7,720
Ramstein-Miesenbach	Grundzentrum	Kaiserslautern	7,543
Enkenbach-Alsenborn	Grundzentrum	Kaiserslautern	6,959
Rodalben	Grundzentrum	Südwestpfalz	6,952
Schönenberg-Kübelberg	Grundzentrum	Kusel	5,543
Rockenhausen	Mittelzentrum in the extended network	Donnersbergkreis	5,322
Otterberg	Grundzentrum	Kaiserslautern	5,274
Kusel	Mittelzentrum	Kusel	4,992
Waldfischbach-Burgalben	Grundzentrum	Südwestpfalz	4,786
Dahn	Mittelzentrum	Südwestpfalz	4,595
