= Lemberg Castle =

- Burg Lemberg, Castrum Lewenberc, Lemburg
- Lemberg
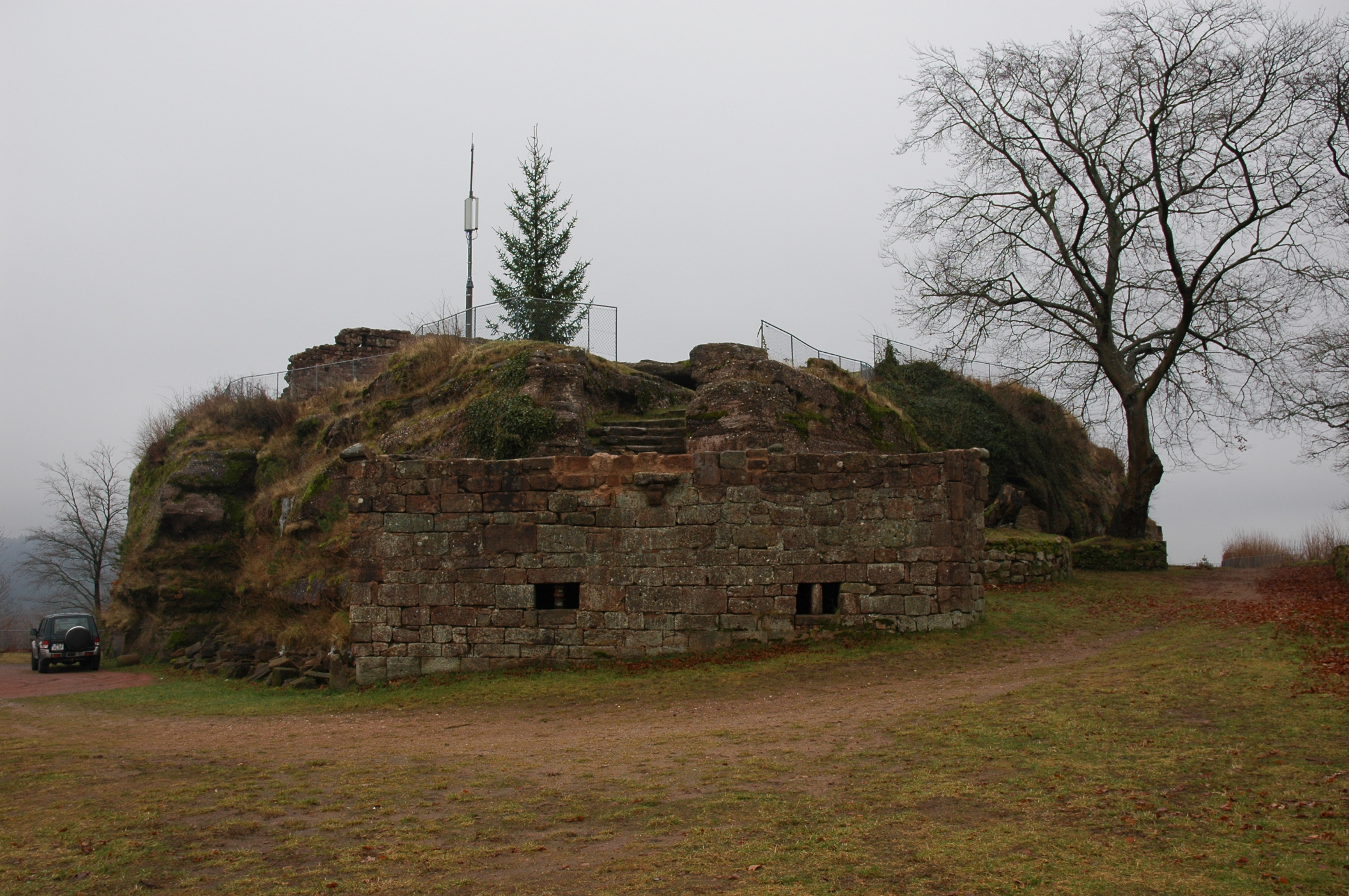
- View from the west

Site information
- Type: hill castle
- Code: DE-RP
- Condition: preserved or largely preserved

Location
- Coordinates: 49°10′26″N 7°39′41″E
- Height: 458 m above sea level (NN)

Site history
- Built: around 1200

Garrison information
- Occupants: counts

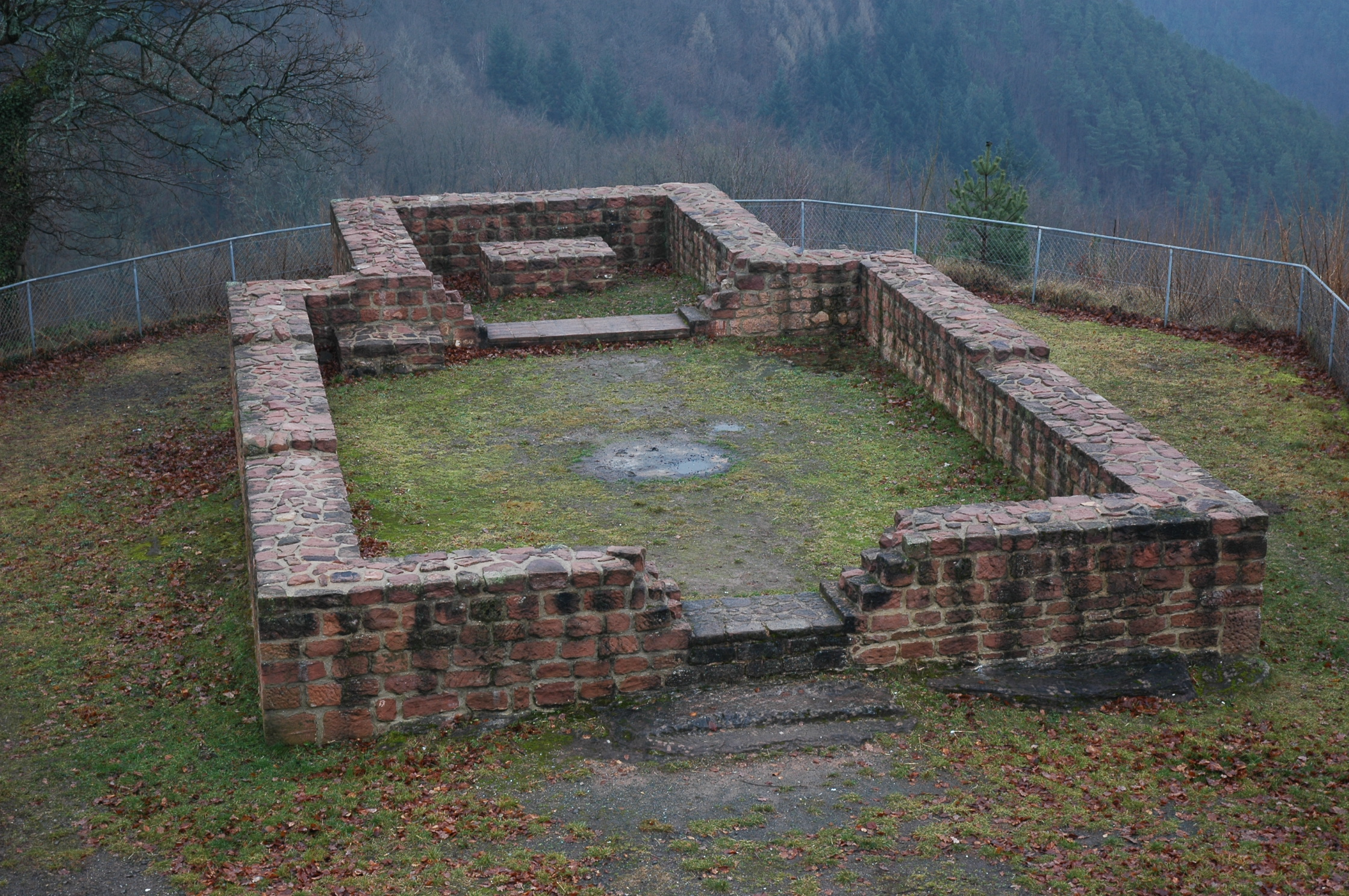
The chapel

Lemberg Castle (German: Burg Lemberg) is a medieval castle on the territory of Lemberg in the county of Südwestpfalz in the German state of Rhineland-Palatinate.

== Location ==
The hill castle stands on the Schlossberg hill at an elevation of 458 metres and houses a castle information centre for the Palatinate and North Vosges regions and a castle café owned by the Palatine Forest Club. Its exposed location means there are extensive views over Lemberg and the surrounding wooded hills of the Wasgau region.

== History ==
In 1198 the abbot of Hornbach Abbey granted two hills, the Gutinberc and the Ruprehtisberc, to Henry I, Count of Zweibrücken. On these hills the count built the castles of Lemberg and Ruppertstein. The construction period was probably around 1200, but the first documented record of the Castrum Lewenberc dates to 1230. Today, all that survives on the Schlossberg hill are some wall remains and the foundation of a chapel. The chapel was mentioned in 1502, but coins and shards of pottery found on the site indicate that it goes back to the second half of the 13th century.

The first known castellan (Burgmann) was Gozo of Lemberg, who is recorded in 1269.

In 1333 the castle went to Count Simon I, son of Eberhardt of Zweibrücken-Bitsch. From 1535 to 1541, his successor, Count James of Zweibrücken-Bitsch resided at the castle and remodeled it into a Renaissance schloss. Following his death in 1570 an inheritance dispute arose, which the Lehnsherr of the castle, Duke Charles of Lorraine ended by occupying the castle with his own troops in 1572. In 1606 he agreed with Count John Reinhard I of Hanau-Lichtenberg, that James' grandson would receive the Lemberg estate, whilst Charles II would hold the lordship of Bitche.

The castle and village were occupied and plundered in 1634 and 1635 during the Thirty Years' War. In 1636 the castle was razed and then only rebuilt in makeshift fashion.

In 1688 Louis XIV of France sparked the War of the Palatine Succession. He acted on the authority of his sister-in-law, Liselotte of the Palatinate. The background was his plans for expansion, which were opposed by an alliance of the German emperor, the imperial princes, Spain and England. In view of their superiority, Louis XIV, ordered that the Palatinate was to be burned. French troops probably slighted the castle in October 1689; even the bergfried was demolished.

From then on, the location no longer held any military significance. The wall remains continued to decay, usable stone was carried off and employed for other purposes, for example, the rebuilding of a village church in 1746. Since the 20th century, the castle ruins have gained in importance as a tourist attraction. In 1953, the Lemberg branch of the Palatine Forest Club renovated the castle and established a café; and since 2001 a modern extension has been built to act as a castle information centre and centre for medieval events.

== Layout ==
One feature of Lemberg Castle is its shaft cistern, also, but not quite correctly, called the well shaft. After digging down 94.80 metres the well diggers had still not struck the ground water. So the shaft was turned into a cistern and almost horizontal adit driven to the shaft. After almost 200 metres the adit meets the shaft at a depth of about 60 metres. A spring on the hillside filled the shaft via the adit thus providing the required water supply. All the work was carried out with hammers and chisels. It is also remarkable that the tunnel ever intercepted the shaft. The well proved to be a valuable archaeological site during several excavation projects in the 1990s, especially for the period of the destruction of the castle in the 17th century.

== Barony of Lemberg ==
The Barony of Lemberg, which last belonged to the Landgraves of Hesse-Darmstadt (1794), comprised the town of Pirmasens as well as 24 villages and was divided into four sub-districts (Unterämter):

- Unteramt Lemberg with its base in Pirmasens and the villages of Burgalben, Donsieders, Fehrbach, Gersbach, Höheinöd, Höhfröschen, Lemberg, Thalfröschen, Thaleischweiler and Winzeln.
- Unteramt Münchweiler with the villages of Münchweiler and Ruppertsweiler.
- Unteramt Vinningen with the villages of Erlenbrunn, Eppenbrunn, Hilst, Kröppen, Riedelberg, Schweix, Simten, Trulben and Vinningen.
- Unteramt Obersteinebach with the villages of Ludwigswinkel, Obersteinbach and Petersbächel.

== Literature ==
- Steffen Bergner, Fridolin Reutti, Hans Klose: Pfälzisches Burgenlexikon. Vol. III (2005) (ed. Institut f. Pfälz. Geschichte und Volkskunde Kaiserslautern) Seite 360-380 mit umfangreicher Lit.-liste und neu vermessenem Plan am Buchende. ISBN 3-927754-51-X
- Marco Bollheimer (2011), Felsenburgen im Burgenparadies Wasgau–Nordvogesen (in German) (3. ed.), Karlsruhe: Selbstverlag, pp. 54 f, ISBN 978-3-9814506-0-6
- Emil Guth, Lemberg: Dorf und Burg im Wandel der Zeit – Aus der Geschichte des ehemaligen Amtsortes von Hanau-Lichtenberg und der Annexen, Höfen und Mühlen. With entries by various other author, publ. Selbstverlag Ortsgemeinde Lemberg, 1984
- Alexander Thon (ed.): ... wie eine gebannte, unnahbare Zauberburg. Burgen in der Südpfalz. 2nd rev. edn., Schnell + Steiner, Regensburg, 2005, pp. 86–89, ISBN 3-7954-1570-5
- Walter Herrmann: Auf Rotem Fels. Seite 118 und 119. Karlsruhe, 2004, ISBN 3-7650-8286-4
- Paul Henry Jones: Historische Reise durch die Pfalz um 1840. Epubli Verlag Berlin, 2013, ISBN 978-3-8442489-0-6
