= Henry I of Zweibrücken =

Henry I of Zweibrücken (German: Heinrich I. von Zweibrücken, ?–1222) was the first count of the County of Zweibrücken founded in 1182 as the result of an inheritance division. He ruled until 1222.

== Life ==
Henry was the younger of two sons of the Count of Saarbrücken, Simon I, to whose estate Zweibrücken Castle belonged. Whilst the older son was given Saarbrücken, the younger son received the eastern part of the region with Zweibrücken and the Lorraine fiefdoms of Lindres, Saargemünd and Marimont. In addition there were estates near Worms that belonged to the County of Zweibrücken.

Henry is first recorded in 1196 in a treaty made with Emperor Henry VI. In this deed, he transferred his rights over the inherited Vogtei of Dirmstein to the empire. In 1198, he concluded a deed of exchange with Abbot Wernher of Hornbach Abbey, in which he acquired the hills of "Gutinberg" and the "Ruprechtisberg". Lemberg Castle was built on the former and Ruppertstein Castle on the latter. In the decades that followed, Henry is found variously as a signatory or witness to deeds, for example in 1211 in the confirmation of town rights on the Strasbourg by Emperor Otto. In 1224 he accompanied King Henry to Toul for negotiations with the French king, Louis VIII.

In his coat of arms Count Henry adopted a lion in recognition of his Saarbrücken origins; however, it was red with a blue tongue on a gold field, as is the case today in the town coat of arms of Zweibrücken.

== Family ==
Henry married Hedwig of Lorraine, the daughter of Duke Frederick I of Lorraine. She had two children. Their daughter, Agnes, married Count Louis of Saarwerden, and their son, Henry, nicknamed the "Henry the Argumentative" (Heinrich der Streitbare), was his successor as Count of Zweibrücken.

With the foundation of the county the Zweibrücken comital dynasty of the Walramides began.

Preceded by Simon of Saarbrücken	Count of Zweibrücken; 1182–1222	Succeeded by Henry II

== Literature ==
- Versuch einer geographisch-historisch-statistischen Beschreibung des kön. bay. Rheinkreises dermalen Pfalz, Michael Frey, 1837.
