= Ruppertstein Castle =

Castle ruins near Lemberg, Germany

- Burg Ruppertstein
- Lemberg
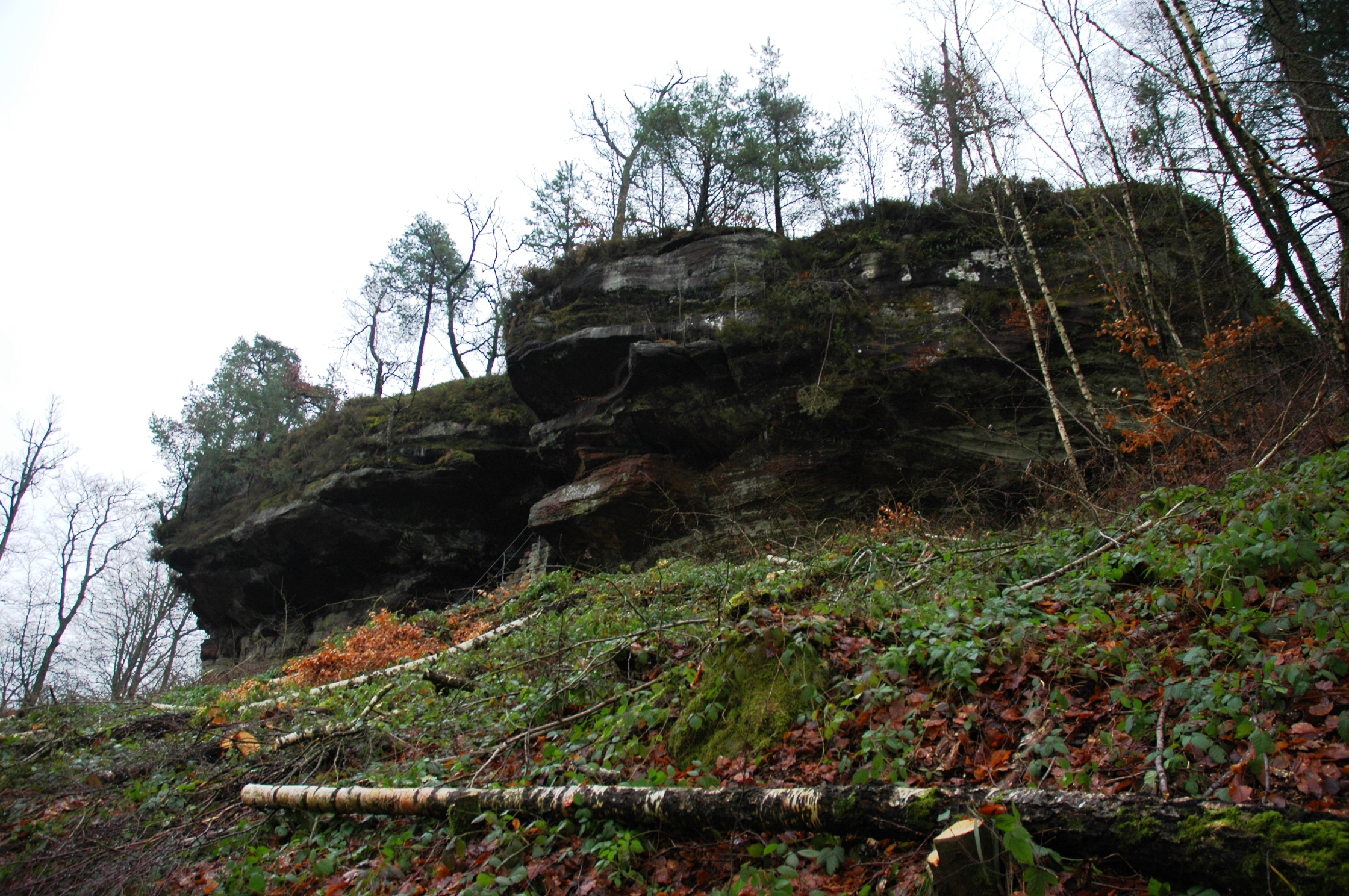
- View from the north

Site information
- Type: hill castle
- Code: DE-RP
- Condition: Mauerreste

Location
- Coordinates: 49°11′12″N 7°41′10″E
- Height: 452 m above sea level (NN)

Site history
- Built: around 1200

Garrison information
- Occupants: counts

Ruppertstein Castle (German: Burg Ruppertstein) is the ruins of a hill castle located at an elevation of 452 m above sea level (NN) near the village of Lemberg in the collective municipality of Pirmasens-Land in the county of Südwestpfalz in the German state of Rhineland-Palatinate. It is situated on top of the Ruppertstein hill south of the village of Ruppertsweiler.

== History ==
Little is known of the castle, which was probably built in the 13th century. Its history began in 1198 with the purchase by Henry I, Count of Zweibrücken, of the hill on which it was built. It was either destroyed in 1525 during the Palatine Peasants' War or had been allowed to fall into ruins by then.

Around 1900 a stone stairway was built on the rocks in order to reach the terrace of the rock on which the castle stood, in order to use it as a viewing point. This stone stairway was refurbished in 2007 by the Pirmasens-Land municipal authorities. A wooden stairway may originally have been used to access the castle.

== Literature ==
- Marco Bollheimer (2011), Felsenburgen im Burgenparadies Wasgau–Nordvogesen (in German) (3. ed.), Karlsruhe: Selbstverlag, pp. 52 f, ISBN 978-3-9814506-0-6
- Emil Heuser: Neuer Pfalzführer. Ludwigshafen am Rhein, 1951
