= County of Zweibrücken =

Territory in the Holy Roman Empire

County of Zweibrücken Grafschaft Zweibrücken
- 1182/90 – 1394
- Coat of arms of the Counts of Zweibrücken

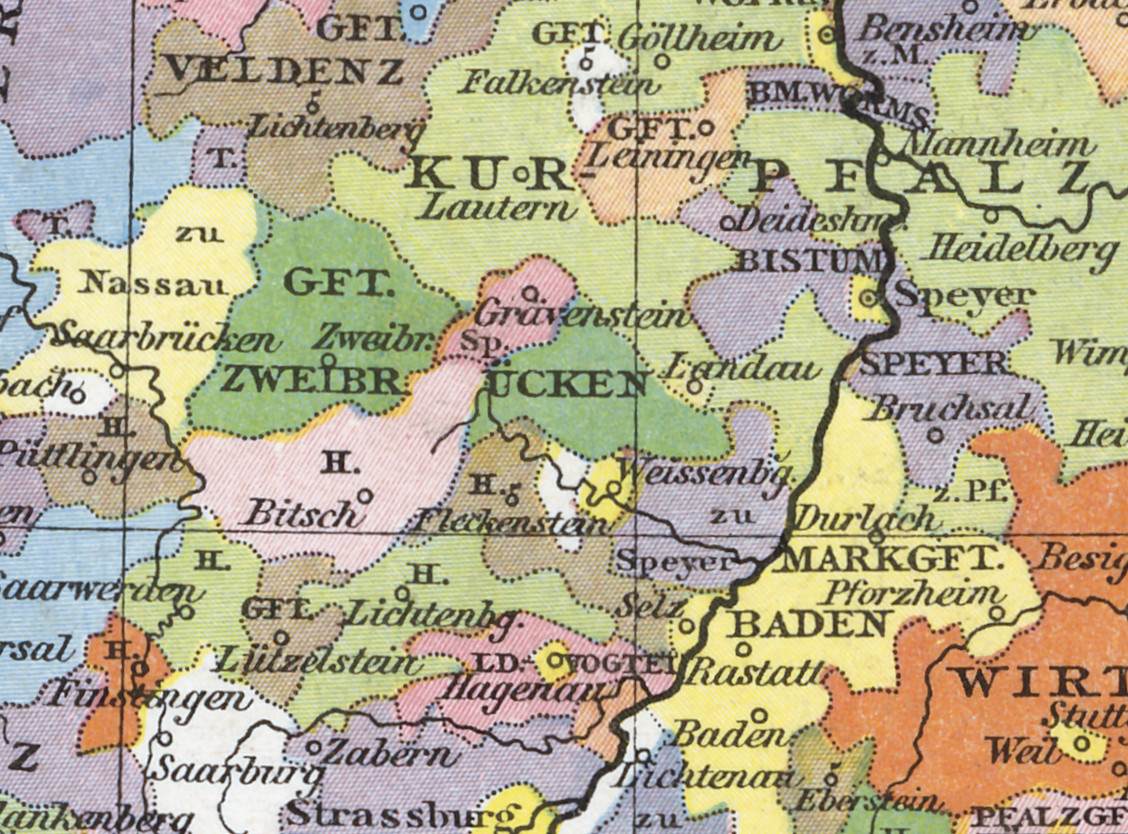
- Counties of Zweibrücken (dark green) and Zweibrücken-Bitsch (pink) about 1400
- Status: County
- Capital: Zweibrücken; 49°15′N 7°22′E
- Historical era: Middle Ages
  - Partitioned from County of Saarbrücken: 1182
  - Partitioned in twain: between 1295 and 1333
  - Fell to Electoral Palatinate: 1394
Preceded by	Succeeded by
County of Saarbrücken	Electorate of the Palatinate; County of Zweibrücken-Bitsch

The County of Zweibrücken (German: Grafschaft Zweibrücken) was a territory in the Holy Roman Empire named for Zweibrücken in which is now situated in the Rhineland-Palatinate. It was created sometime between 1182 and 1190 from an inheritance division of the county of Saarbrücken and lasted until 1394.

== Creation ==
The House of Saarbrücken ranked at the beginning of the 12th century amongst the most prominent families in southwestern Germany, with major landholdings in present-day Lorraine, Alsace, Saarland and Rhineland-Palatinate and prominent patronages. Their power is best characterized by the fact that members of the family twice in the 12th century held the powerful position of Archbishop-Elector of Mainz. Seemingly soon after 1100, they gained patronage over the monastery of Hornbach with large landholdings between Blies and the Palatinate Forest.

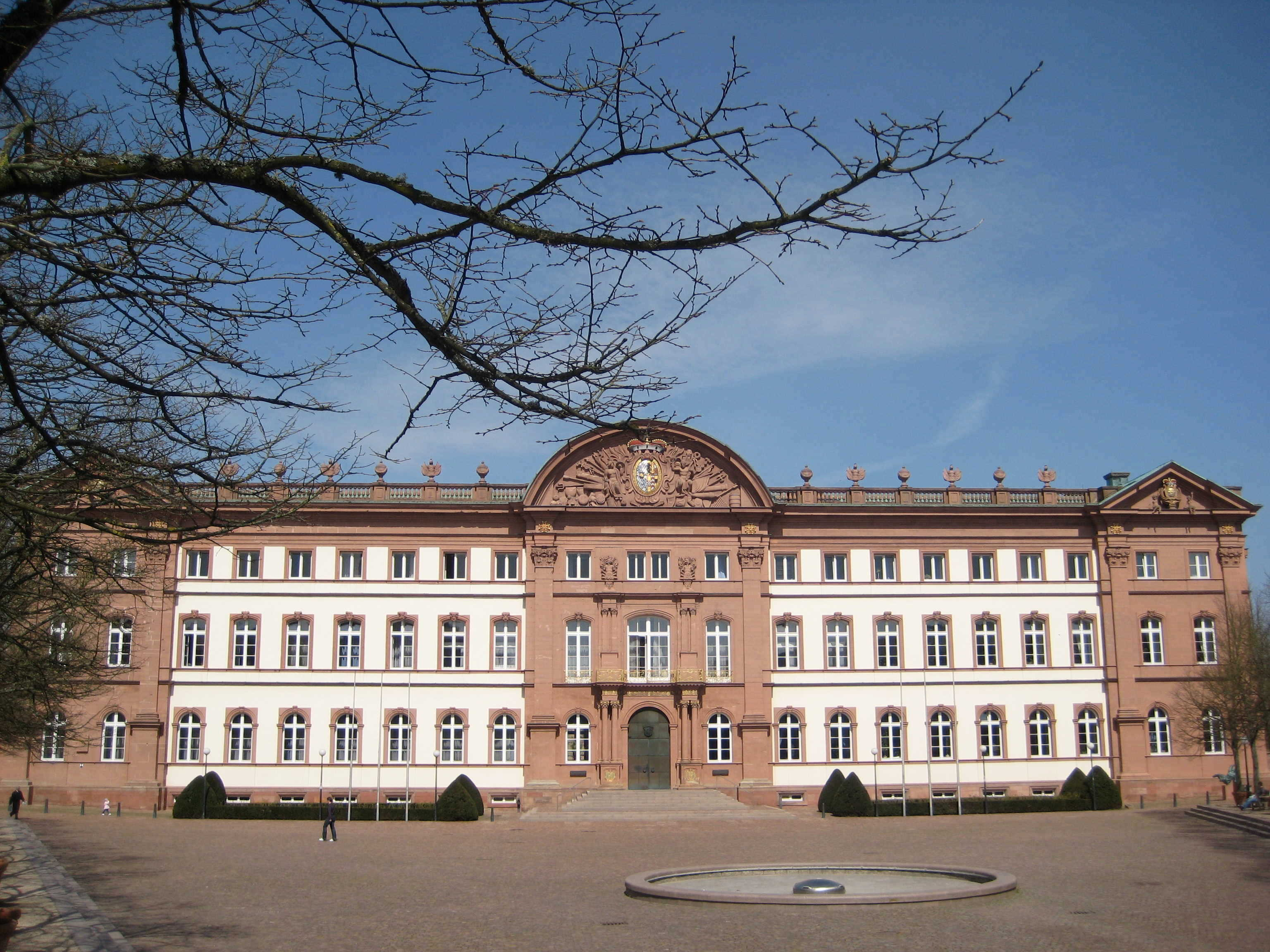
Zweibrücken Castle

Here, at the crossing over the Schwarzbach, and probably about 1150, the water castle of Zweibrücken was built. With an inheritance division in the Saarbrücken counts' family, Zweibrücken fell to the younger son Henry I, who founded the line of Counts of Zweibrücken. Around the castle, a town formed and received city rights in 1352, together with Hornbach.

== Geography ==
The initial allowance of the County of Zweibrücken, in order to name here some relevant constituents, consisted of fiefs, i.e. from the Empire half of Landeck castle with eleven villages around Bergzabern, from the bishopric of Metz rights over their serfs, the so-called "Stephan's people", from the bishopric of Verdun half of Liebenberg castle near Namborn, in patronages the important patronage over the monastery of Hornbach, other patronages over the nuns cloister Altenmünster in Mainz and over several holdings of the ecclesiastical foundations saint Alban in Mainz and of the Liebfrauen there, finally allods between Rhine and Mosel, amongst those Zweibrücken castle, Lemberg Castle built after 1198 by count Henry I, and shares of Marimont-lès-Bénestroff, Lindre-Haute and Sarreguemines.

== Evolution ==
The system of primogeniture had not yet come into common use and the ongoing inheritance partitions in Southwestern Germany affected many territories leading to their decline. This held true for the County of Zweibrücken. Around 1237, Count Henry I was succeeded by his son Henry II. In 1282, Henry II was succeeded by two of his sons, Eberhard I and Walram I, who ruled the county jointly. Because they did not always agree, in 1286 they decided to divide the territory. Eberhard, I received the lordship of Lemberg and Walram I the lordship of Zweibrücken. This division was further refined in 1295 and solidified in 1333 with the division of the last shared estates, creating two independent counties.

=== County of Zweibrücken-Zweibrücken ===
The western part of the former county, consisting of the territory around Zweibrücken and some other parts, fell to Walram I and remained with his descendants. The last count of the Walramide line, Eberhard II, who had no children and was impoverished by numerous feuds, pledged it in 1385 to the Counts Palatine from the palatine line of the House of Wittelsbach. After his death in 1394 they inherited their new estates and thus ruled in the Western Palatinate for the first time. After unification with the County of Veldenz in the year 1444, the Principality of Palatine Zweibrücken emerged.

=== County of Zweibrücken-Bitsch ===
The eastern part of the Zweibrücken lands, the Barony of Lemberg, fell to Eberhard I. In 1297, he exchanged some of his towns with Duke Frederick III of Lorraine and received in exchange the castle and lordship of Bitche as a fief. He founded the line of counts of Zweibrücken-Bitsch that reigned over the baronies of Lemberg and Bitsch until the male line became extinct in 1570.

== Counts of Zweibrücken ==
=== Saarbrücken line (1182-1286) ===
of the line of the Counts of Saarbrücken

- 1182–1237 Henry I
- 1237–1282 Henry II
- 1282–1309 Walram I
- 1282-1286 brothers Eberhard I and Walram I in condominium

=== Walramides (1286-1394) ===
after Eberhard I's death, brother Walram I continued, as first in the Walramide line

- 1286-1309 Walram I
- 1309–1311 Simon
- 1311–1366 Walram II
- 1366–1394 Eberhard II
