= Frederick, Count of Saarbrücken =

Count of Saarbrücken from 1118 to 1135

- Born: 11th century
- Died: 1135
- Noble family: House of Saarbrücken
- Spouse: Gisela of Lorraine
- Father: Siegbert of Saarbrücken

Frederick, Count of Saarbrücken (died 1135) was a German nobleman. He was the first to style himself Count of Saarbrücken.

== Life ==
His father, Siegbert, was a count in the Saargau; his mother may have been a daughter of the Lord of Eppenstein. His brother Bruno was Bishop of Speyer; his brother Adalbert I was Archbishop-Elector of Mainz.

In 1105 Frederick inherited his father's position. In 1118, he was called Count of Saarbrücken for the first time. He was vassal of the Bishop of Metz.

== Marriage and issue ==
Frederick was married to Gisela of Lorraine, who brought possessions around Hornbach Abbey into the marriage. They had three children:

- Agnes, married c. 1132 to Duke Frederick II of Swabia
- Simon I, his successor
- Adalbert II, was Archbishop-Elector of Mainz from 1138 to 1141.
