= Adalbert I of Mainz =

German Catholic cleric (died 1137)

Adalbert I
- Archbishop of Mainz
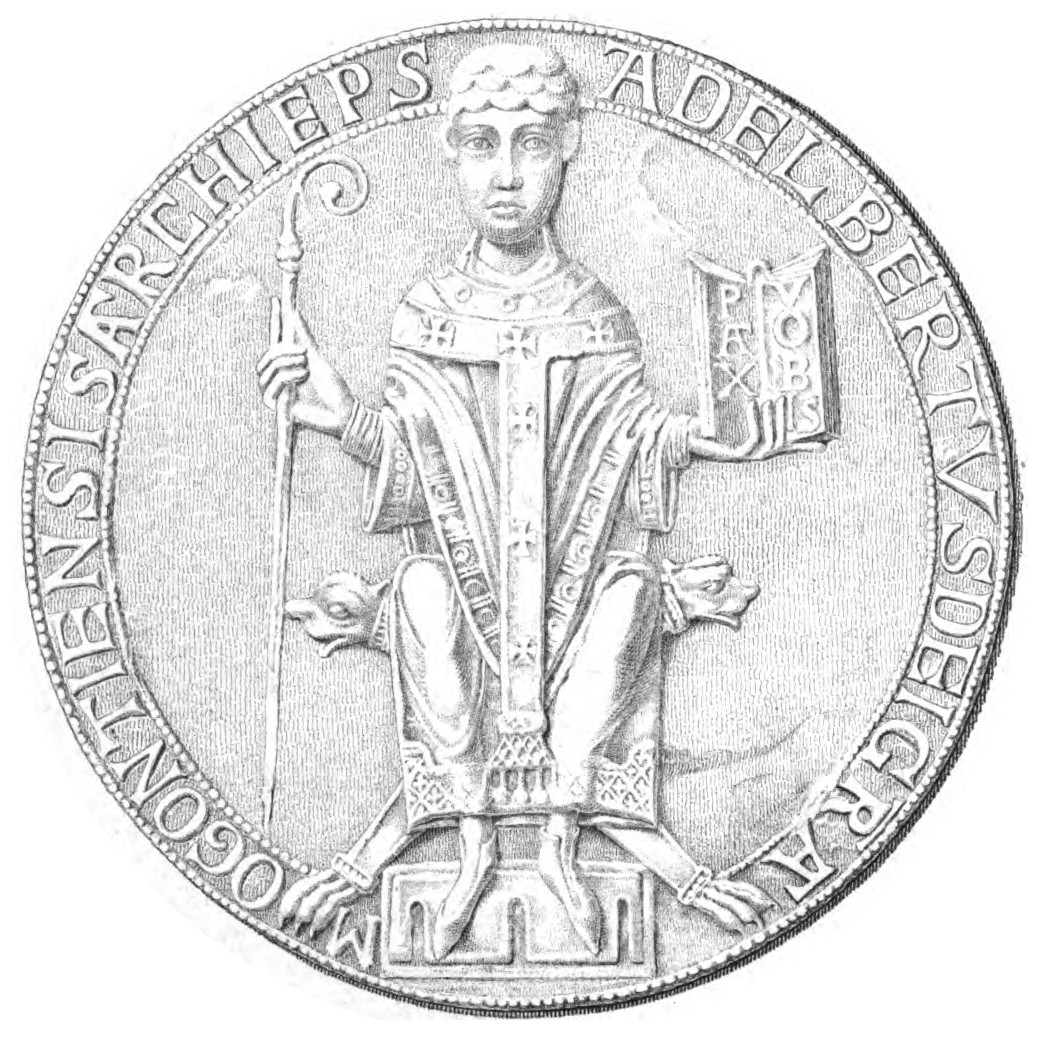
- Sketch of the seal of Adalbert on a falsified document from 1174-1211
- Church: Catholic Church
- Diocese: Electorate of Mainz
- In office: 1111–1137
- Predecessor: Ruthard
- Successor: Adalbert II

Personal details
- Died: June 23, 1137

Adalbert I von Saarbrücken (died June 23, 1137) was Archbishop-Elector of Mainz from 1111 until his death. He played a key role in opposing Henry V, Holy Roman Emperor, during the Investiture Controversy, and secured the election of Lothair III rather than Henry V's chosen heir in 1125, causing later Holy Roman Emperors to make concessions in order to maintain hereditary monarchy.

== Life ==
Adalbert was the younger brother of Frederick, Count of Saarbrücken. Adalbert served as imperial chancellor under Emperors Henry IV and Henry V. In 1110 he was sent to Rome as part of an embassy to arrange for Henry V's coronation as emperor. In exchange for supporting the Emperor in his quest to regain the rights to investiture (which Henry received from Pope Paschal II in 1111), he was given the position of Archbishop-Elector of Mainz.

Following this, however, Adalbert turned against the Emperor, due to personal dislikes as well as territorial ambitions. Henry ended up imprisoning Adalbert for three years (1112–1115) without trial after the archbishop refused to hand over control of the imperial castles.

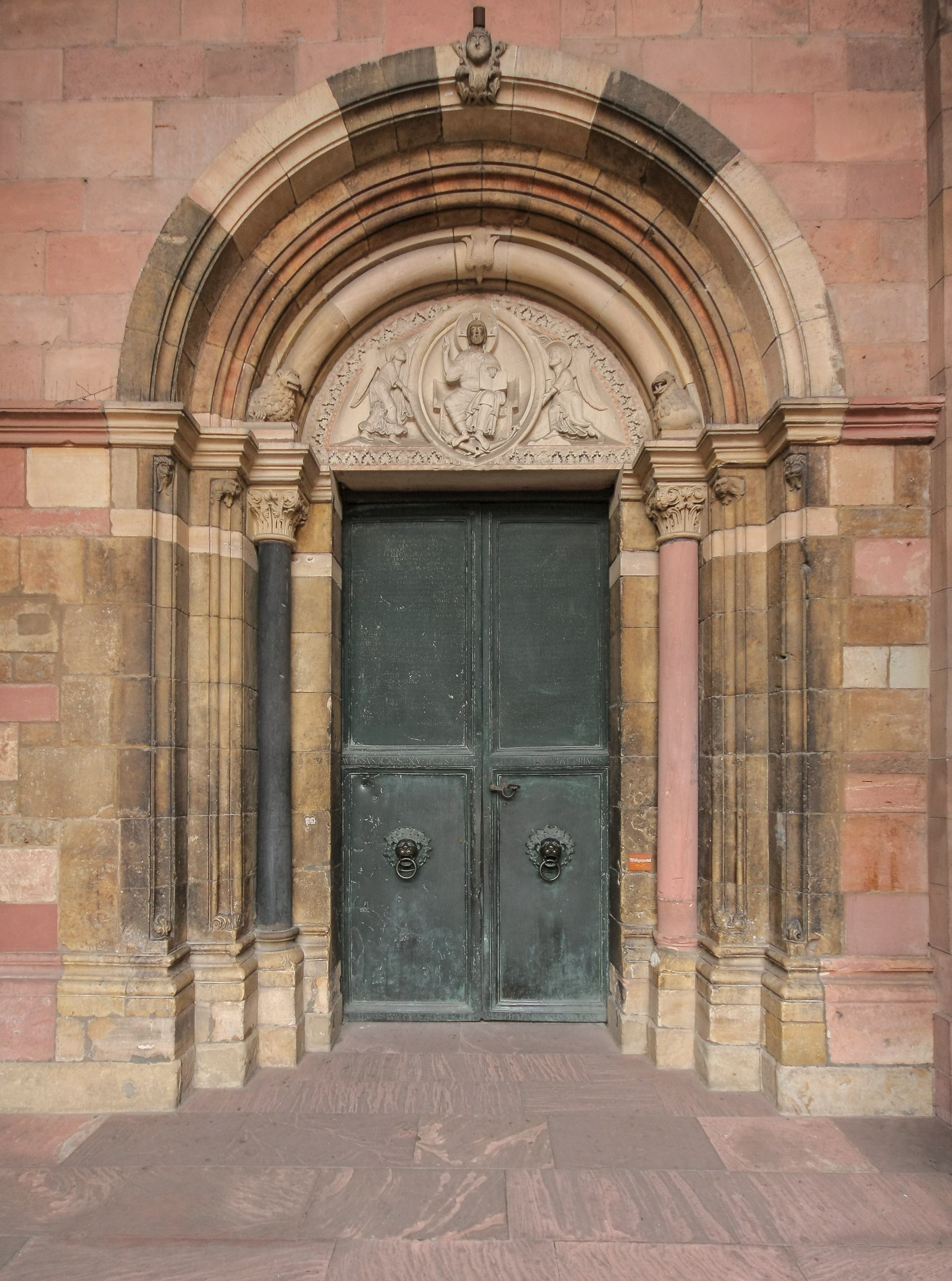
Market portal of Mainz cathedral. The liberty privilege for the Mainz citizens is engraved on the bronze wings.

Following his release, caused by a revolt by the people of Mainz, he actively worked against the Emperor, using the latter's excommunication as a pretext. Strong papal campaigning had meanwhile turned much of the German clergy against the Emperor, and Adalbert soon became the leader of the anti-Imperialist bishops.

When Henry left for Italy in 1116, Adalbert raised much of the country against the Emperor, and the conflict continued. After Pope Calixtus II gained power in 1119, he made the archbishop a papal legate, following which Henry attacked Mainz. In response, Adalbert convinced the Saxon nobility to revolt. Negotiations between the two sides after they met for battle resulted in a temporary truce. The conflict between the two was suspended indefinitely following the Concordat of Worms in 1122, where the Emperor surrendered investiture.

Adalbert did not forget his hatred of Henry, however. Upon the latter's death in 1125, he saw a golden opportunity. The archbishop felt that the German monarchy was much too powerful and needed to be weakened, starting with the elimination of hereditary succession. In the past, the elections for the Salian kings had been more of a mere stamp of approval for the living Emperors' sons than an actual election to determine who would become king. In this case, Henry's nephew, Frederick II, Duke of Swabia stood as the obvious choice. However, after gaining the imperial insignia, the archbishop sabotaged Frederick's rise to the kingship. Adalbert convinced the nobility that hereditary monarchy was not in their best interests, and persuaded them to instead choose the relatively weak candidate Duke Lothair of Saxony, who became Lothair III. The election was thus important in that the nobility could no longer be guaranteed to vote for a king's designated heir, which forced later kings to give even greater concessions than ever before in return for a promise to elect their sons.

Adalbert died in 1137 and was buried in a chapel of Mainz Cathedral. His was succeeded by his nephew Adalbert II, second son of Frederick (whose title of Count of Saarbrücken had passed to Adalbert II's older brother, Simon I, in 1135).

== Sources ==
- Karl Hampe (1973). Germany Under the Salian and Hohenstaufen Emperors. ISBN 0-631-14180-4
- Herbermann, Charles, ed. (1913). "Adalbert I" . Catholic Encyclopedia. New York: Robert Appleton Company.

Catholic Church titles
Preceded by Ruthard	Archbishop of Mainz; 1111–1137	Succeeded by Adalbert II
