= Roppeviller =

- Commune
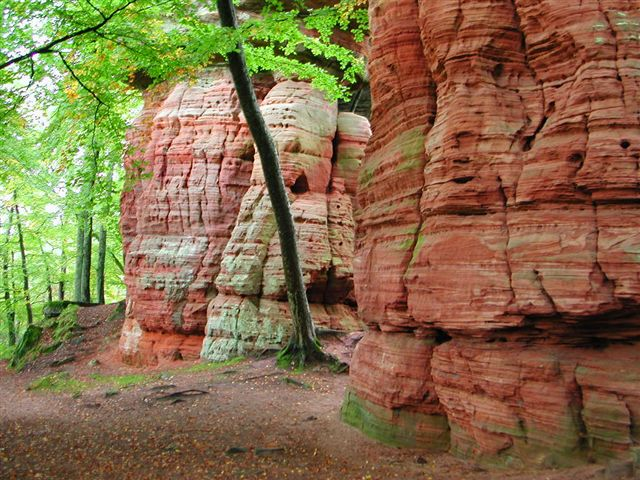
- The Altschloss

- Coat of arms
- Location of Roppeviller
- Location within France Location within Grand Est
- Coordinates: 49°06′10″N 7°30′34″E
- Country: France
- Region: Grand Est
- Department: Moselle
- Arrondissement: Sarreguemines
- Canton: Bitche
- Intercommunality: CC du Pays de Bitche

Government
  - Mayor (2020–2026): Serge Stebler
- Area^{1}: 13.77 km^{2} (5.32 sq mi)
- Elevation: 260 m (850 ft)
- Highest elevation: 451 m (1,480 ft)
- Lowest elevation: 257 m (843 ft)
- Population (2023): 97
  - Density: 7.0/km^{2} (18/sq mi)
- Time zone: UTC+01:00 (CET)
  - Summer (DST): UTC+02:00 (CEST)
- INSEE/Postal code: 57594 /57230
- ^{1} French Land Register data, which excludes lakes, ponds, glaciers > 1 km^{2} (0.386 sq mi or 247 acres) and river estuaries.

Roppeviller (French pronunciation: [ʁɔpvilɛʁ]; German: Roppweiler; Lorraine Franconian: Roppwiller) is a commune in the Moselle department of the Grand Est administrative region in north-eastern France.

The village belongs to the Pays de Bitche and to the Northern Vosges Regional Nature Park.

A path from the village runs up to the Altschlossfelsen rocks, a popular walking destination, on the hill of Brechenberg on the German side of the border.

== See also ==
- Communes of the Moselle department
