= Simon I of Saarbrücken =

12th-century Count of Saarbrücken

Simon I, Count of Saarbrücken
- Died: after 1182
- Noble family: House of Saarbrücken
- Spouse: Mathilda of Sponheim
- Father: Frederick, Count of Saarbrücken
- Mother: Gisela of Lorraine

Simon I of Saarbrücken (died after 1182) was a German nobleman. He was the second ruling Count of Saarbrücken (de), in office 1135 - 1183.

== Life ==
Simon was a son of Frederick, Count of Saarbrücken (d. 1135) and his wife Gisela of Lorraine (b.c. 1100), daughter of Theodoric II, Duke of Lorraine. He succeeded his father as Count of Saarbrücken in 1135. In the same year, he founded Wadgassen Abbey together with his mother. His younger brother Adalbert II became Archbishop of Mainz in 1138.

He was appointed feudal vassal by the bishops of Metz, and through his marriage he managed to acquire various territories with the right of advocacy, especially in the Palatinate.

In 1168, Frederick Barbarossa destroyed the original Saarbrücken Castle, along with three other forts, due to Simon's standing with Conrad of Hohenstaufen against the Holy Roman Emperor.

After his death, between 1183 and 1188, the county was divided. His eldest son, Simon II inherited a smaller County of Saarbrücken; his younger son Henry I founded the new County of Zweibrücken.

== Marriage and issue ==
Simon was married to a Mathilda, probably a daughter of Count Meginhard I of Sponheim. They had the following children together:

- Simon II (de) (d.a. 1207), successor as Count. He married b. 1180 to Liutgard (d.a. 1239), a daughter or other close relative to Emich III, Count of Leiningen. One of their sons was Simon III, another was Friedrich III (d. 1237), who inherited the County of Leiningen.
- Henry I (de) (d. 1228), married Hedwig (d.a. 1228), a daughter of Frederick I, Duke of Lorraine. He became Count of Zweibrücken.
- Frederick (d.b. 1187)
- Gottfried, a canon in Mainz
- Adalbert (d.a. 1210), archdeacon in Mainz
- Jutta (d.b. 1223), married Folmar II, Count of Blieskastel, son of Folmar I (d.a. 1179), and Clementia of Metz.
- Sophie (d.a. 1215), married Henry III, Duke of Limburg (1140–1121)
- Agnes (d.b. 1180), married Günther III, Count of Schwarzburg (d.a. 1197)
