= Bottenbach =

- Municipality
- Coat of arms

- Location of Bottenbach within Südwestpfalz district
- Interactive map of Bottenbach
- Location within Germany Location within Rhineland-Palatinate
- Coordinates: 49°10′55″N 7°29′45″E
- Country: Germany
- State: Rhineland-Palatinate
- District: Südwestpfalz
- Municipal assoc.: Pirmasens-Land

Government
  - Mayor (2019–24): Klaus Weber (CDU)

Area
  - Total: 6.16 km^{2} (2.38 sq mi)
- Elevation: 341 m (1,119 ft)

Population (2025-12-31)
  - Total: 712
  - Density: 116/km^{2} (299/sq mi)
- Time zone: UTC+01:00 (CET)
  - Summer (DST): UTC+02:00 (CEST)
- Postal codes: 66504
- Dialling codes: 06339
- Vehicle registration: PS
- Website: www.bottenbach.de

Bottenbach (German pronunciation: [ˈbɔtn̩bax]) is a municipality in Südwestpfalz district, in Rhineland-Palatinate, western Germany and belongs to the municipal association Pirmasens-Land.
