= Obersimten =

- Municipality
- Coat of arms

- Location of Obersimten within Südwestpfalz district
- Interactive map of Obersimten
- Location within Germany Location within Rhineland-Palatinate
- Coordinates: 49°10′02″N 7°34′54″E
- Country: Germany
- State: Rhineland-Palatinate
- District: Südwestpfalz
- Municipal assoc.: Pirmasens-Land

Government
  - Mayor (2019–24): Thorsten Höh (CDU)

Area
  - Total: 2.26 km^{2} (0.87 sq mi)
- Elevation: 410 m (1,350 ft)

Population (2025-12-31)
  - Total: 610
  - Density: 270/km^{2} (700/sq mi)
- Time zone: UTC+01:00 (CET)
  - Summer (DST): UTC+02:00 (CEST)
- Postal codes: 66957
- Dialling codes: 06331
- Vehicle registration: PS
- Website: www.obersimten.de

Obersimten is a municipality in Südwestpfalz district, in Rhineland-Palatinate, western Germany and belongs to the municipal association Pirmasens-Land.

== Geography ==
Obersimten is located west of the Palatinate Forest on the edge of Zweibrücken hill country between Pirmasens in the northeast and Vinningen in the southwest.
