= Altschlossfelsen =

Coordinates: 49°06′15″N 7°32′22″E

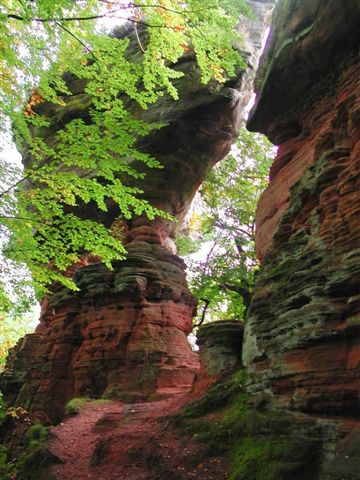
The Altschlossfelsen rocks

The Altschlossfelsen (French: Rochers du Vieux Château, "Old Castle Rocks") is a rock outcrop formed of bunter sandstone in the Palatine Forest of Germany, near the border with France. The 1,500-metre-long rock wall is located on a hill known as the Brechenberg near Eppenbrunn, 406 m above sea level (NHN).

Discoveries from the Hallstatt and Roman period and evidence of a medieval castle from the 11th or 12th century bear witness to earlier settlement.

The Altschlossfelsen is well known because of its many, diversely shaped rocks, caused by weathering, and its rare lichens. At the start of the rock sequence are two mighty sandstone towers. A popular footpath runs along the foot of the rocks that continues to the village of Roppeviller in French Lorraine.
