= Pirmasens-Land =

Municipality in Rhineland-Palatinate, Germany

- Verbandsgemeinde
- Coat of arms

- Location of Pirmasens-Land within Südwestpfalz district
- Interactive map of Pirmasens-Land
- Location within Germany Location within Rhineland-Palatinate
- Coordinates: 49°12′N 7°36′E
- Country: Germany
- State: Rhineland-Palatinate
- District: Südwestpfalz
- Seat: Pirmasens
- Subdivisions: 10 municipalities

Area
  - Total: 143.01 km^{2} (55.22 sq mi)

Population (2025-12-31)
  - Total: 11,554
  - Density: 80.792/km^{2} (209.25/sq mi)
- Time zone: UTC+01:00 (CET)
  - Summer (DST): UTC+02:00 (CEST)
- Website: www.pirmasens-land.de

Pirmasens-Land is a Verbandsgemeinde ("collective municipality") in the Südwestpfalz district, in Rhineland-Palatinate, Germany. It is situated on the southwestern edge of the Palatinate Forest, around Pirmasens. The seat of the municipality is in Pirmasens, itself not part of the municipality.

The Verbandsgemeinde Pirmasens-Land consists of the following Ortsgemeinden ("local municipalities"):

1. Bottenbach
2. Eppenbrunn
3. Hilst
4. Kröppen
5. Lemberg
6. Obersimten
7. Ruppertsweiler
8. Schweix
9. Trulben
10. Vinningen
