= Fraulautern Abbey =

- Abtei Fraulautern
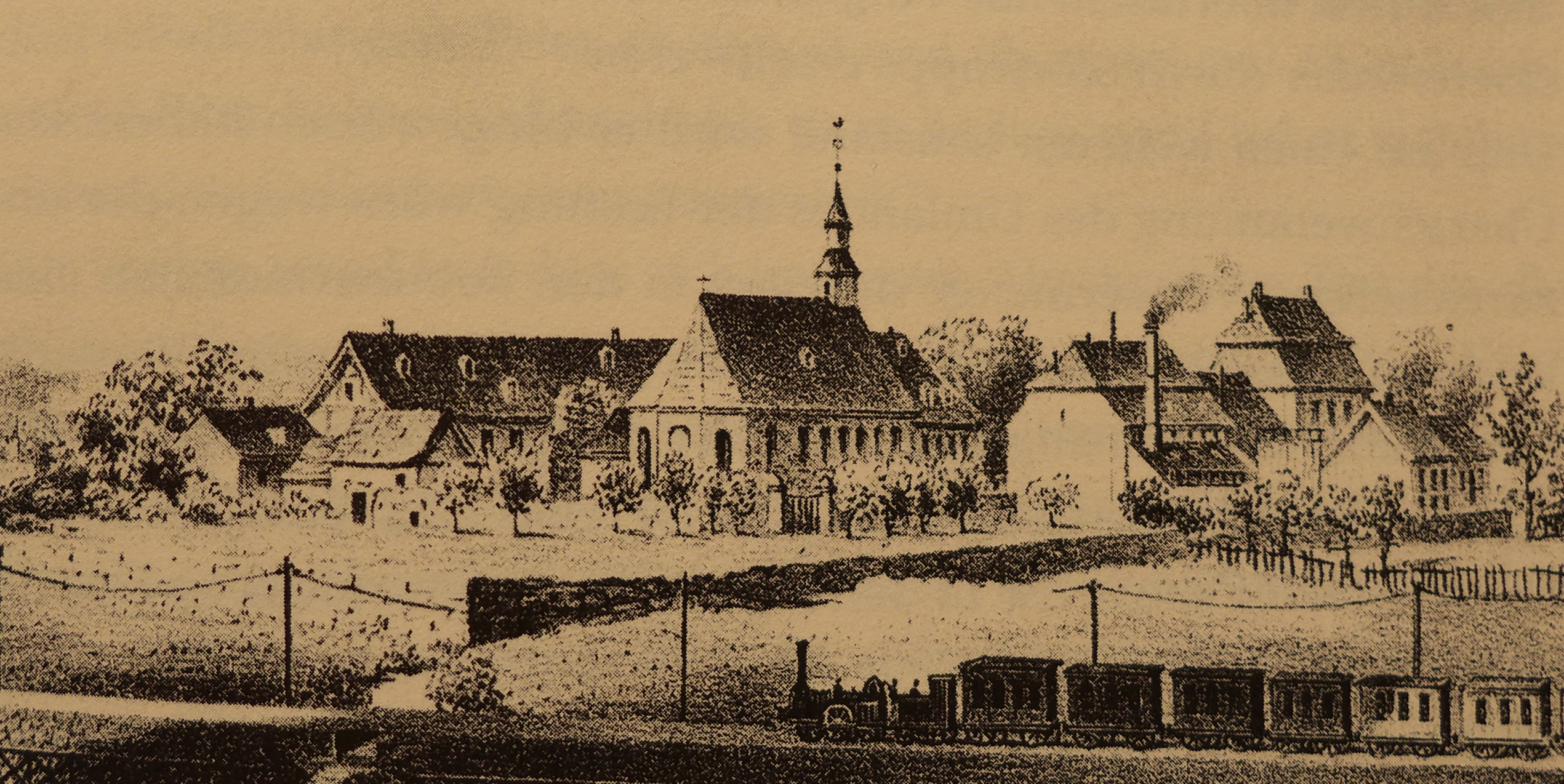
- Fraulautern Abbey, 1865, with in the foreground the new railway line on the Saar, on the left the abbey mill (Klostermühle), in the middle the Baroque abbey church, on the right the gatehouse

- Location within Saarland Location within Germany
- Interactive map of Fraulautern Abbey

Monastery information
- Order: Augustinian canonesses
- Established: 12th century
- Dedication: St. Augustine

Site
- Location: Saarlouis in Saarland, Germany
- Coordinates: 49°19′23″N 6°45′47″E

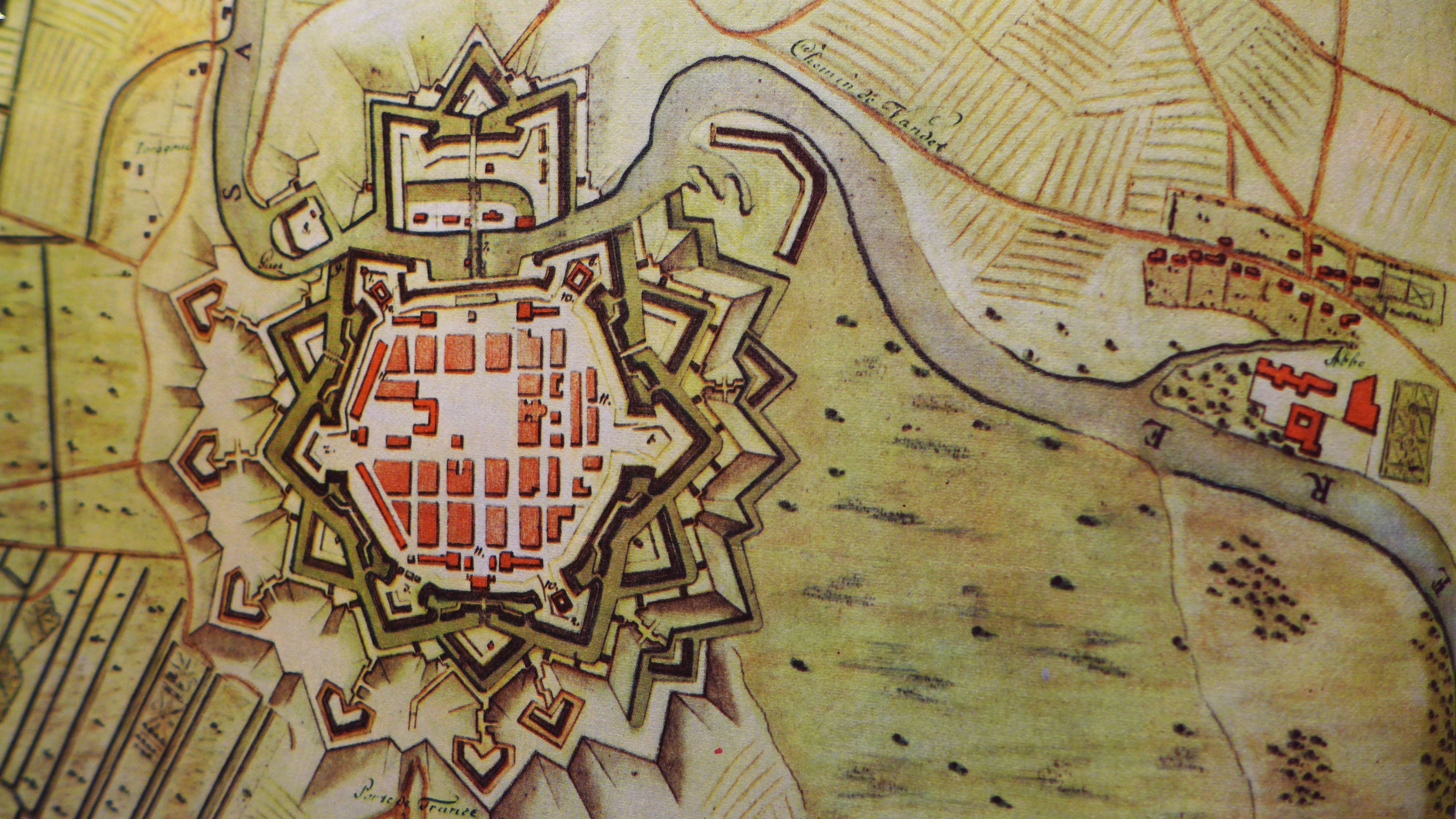
Situation of the abbey and the village of Fraulautern on the Flandernweg on the "Plan de Sarlouis et de la Situation", map around 1740 with the municipal fortification; in the east the village of Fraulautern with its abbey on the banks of the Saar (Stadtarchiv Saarlouis)

Fraulautern Abbey (German: Abtei Fraulautern; Latin: Abbatia in Lutrea) was a community of Augustinian canonesses of the nobility, founded in the 12th century; it was suppressed in the 1790s during the French Revolution.

== Abbey buildings ==
The abbey buildings, which are still extant in part, are located in Fraulautern, now part of Saarlouis in Saarland, Germany. Between the French Revolution and 1936, when Fraulautern was incorporated into Saarlouis (then known as Saarlautern), the buildings were used as the town hall. They are now used by the Grundschule of Fraulautern under the name "Im Alten Kloster".

== Abbesses ==
From R. Rudolf Rehanek:

- c. 1160: Margarethe
- 1169–1197: ?
- c. 1225: Meisterin J.
- 1225–1236: ?
- 1241: Berta
- 1260: Jutta
- 1262–1269: ?
- 1269–1279: Gertrud
- 1289: Elsa
- 1296: Havils Nonneyer
- 1299, 1303: Mathilde von Herbitzheim
- 1308–1312: Hanvela
- 1312–1335: Elisabeth von Saarbrücken
- 1353–1344: Hildegarde
- 1344: Esebet
- 1354: ?
- 1357–1373: Gudela
- 1395: Aleyt von Castel
- 1403: Lysa von der Neuerburg
- 1406, 1443: Katharina von Wolfstein
- 1448–1472: Margarethe von Huntingen
- 1472–1492: Katharina von Bettingen
- 1492–1507: Eva Huberissen von Schellodenbach (Schallodenbach)
- 1507–1522: Margarethe von Wolfstein / Gertrud Brederin von Hohenstein
- 1550–1560: Hildegard von Becheln
- 1565–1587: Margarethe von Bübingen / Apollonia von Gressnich
- 1587–1598: Apollonia von Gressnich / Agnes Braun von Schmidtburg
- 1617–1622: Johanetta von Wiltz
- 1622–1626: Anna Maria von Geispoltzheim
- 1626–1633: Gabriele de Braubach
- 1646–1677: Dorothea Braun von Schmidtburg
- 1677–1691: Carolina von Hagen
- 1691–1695: Arnolda Elisabeth von Weller
- 1700: Odilia Braun von Schmidtburg
- 1708: A. E. von Metzenhausen
- 1720–1730: A. M. von Geispitzheim
- 1730–1757: Maria Theresia de Saintignon
- 1757–1773: Maria Helene von Rathsamshausen
- 1773–1791: Sophie von Neuenstein

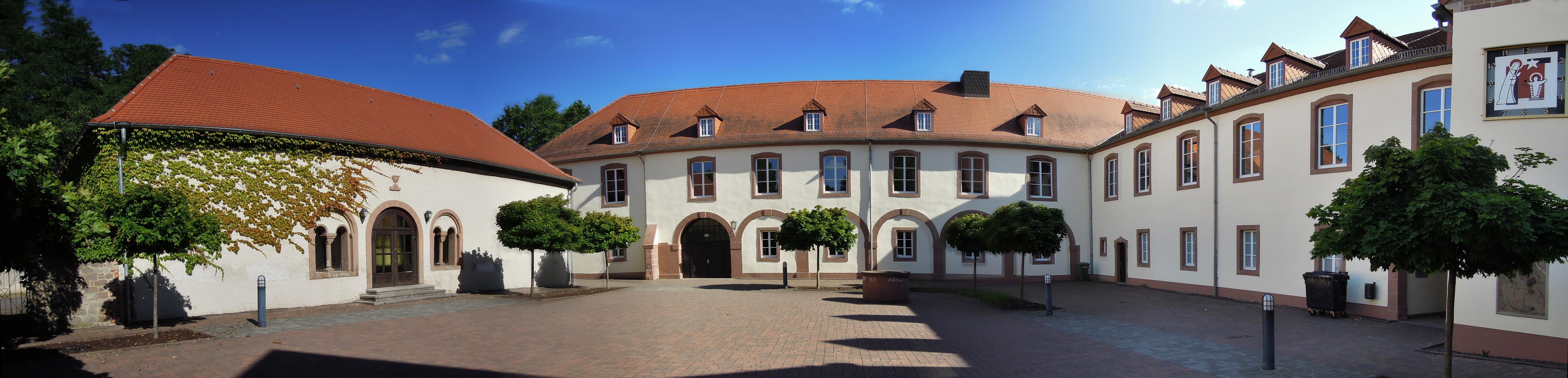
Panorama of the former abbey buildings
