= Kröppen =

- Municipality
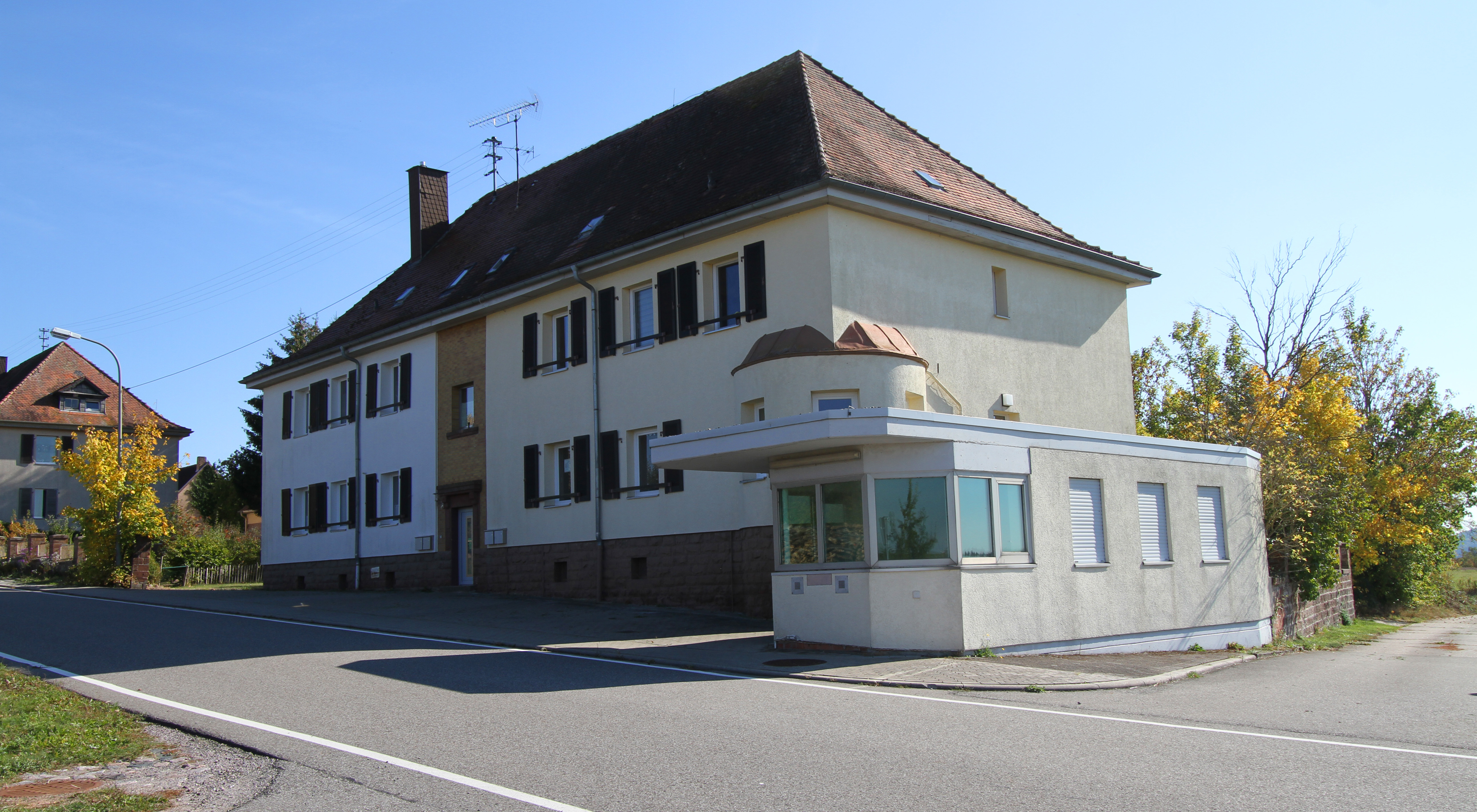
- Former customs station Kröppen

- Coat of arms

- Location of Kröppen within Südwestpfalz district
- Interactive map of Kröppen
- Location within Germany Location within Rhineland-Palatinate
- Coordinates: 49°9′1″N 7°31′39″E
- Country: Germany
- State: Rhineland-Palatinate
- District: Südwestpfalz
- Municipal assoc.: Pirmasens-Land

Government
  - Mayor (2019–24): Steffen Schwarz

Area
  - Total: 10.48 km^{2} (4.05 sq mi)
- Elevation: 325 m (1,066 ft)

Population (2025-12-31)
  - Total: 700
  - Density: 67/km^{2} (170/sq mi)
- Time zone: UTC+01:00 (CET)
  - Summer (DST): UTC+02:00 (CEST)
- Postal codes: 66957
- Dialling codes: 06335
- Vehicle registration: PS

Kröppen (German pronunciation: [ˈkʁœpn̩]) is a municipality in Südwestpfalz district, in Rhineland-Palatinate, western Germany and belongs to the municipal association Pirmasens-Land.
