= Trulben =

- Municipality
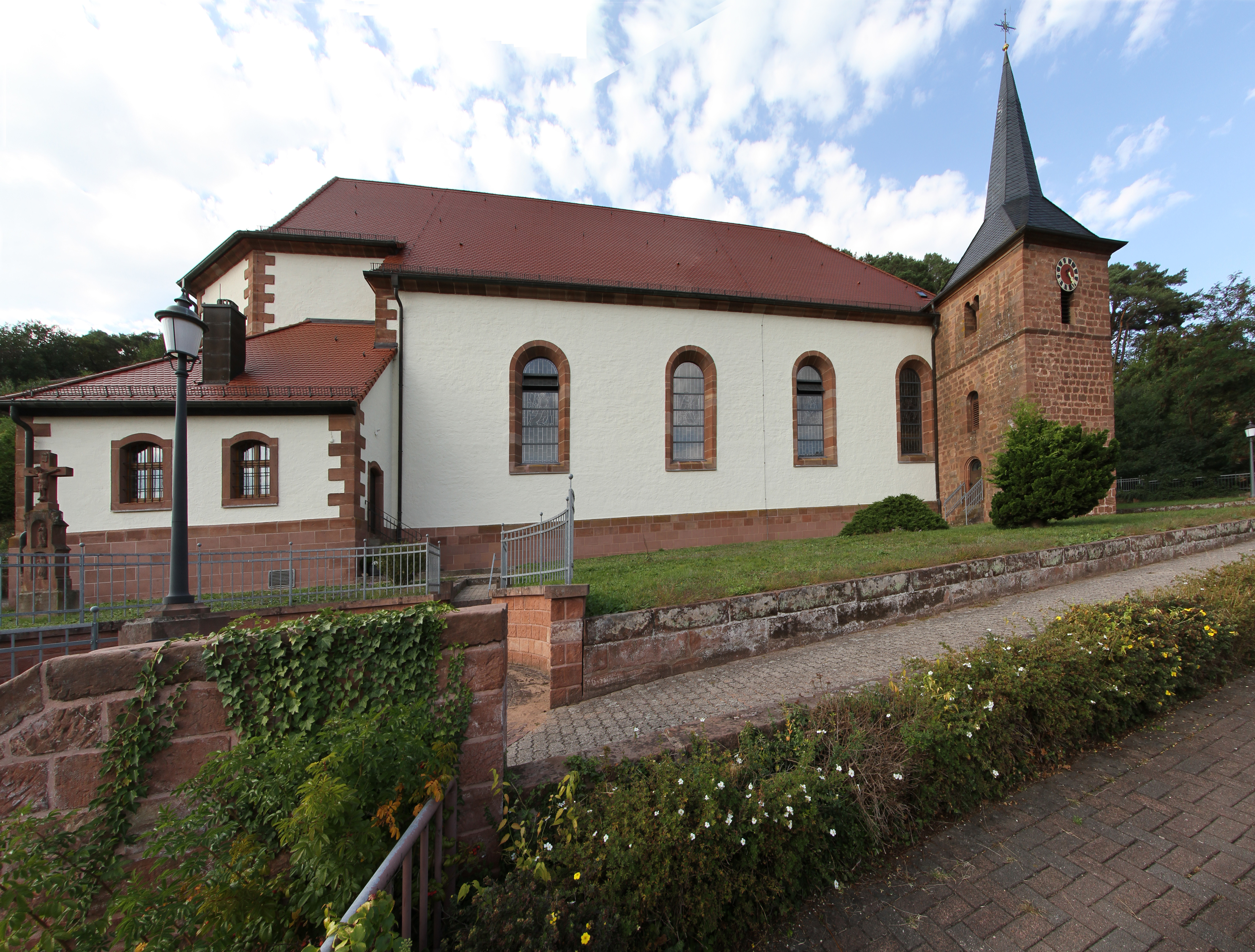

- Coat of arms

- Location of Trulben within Südwestpfalz district
- Interactive map of Trulben
- Location within Germany Location within Rhineland-Palatinate
- Coordinates: 49°11′50″N 7°32′0″E
- Country: Germany
- State: Rhineland-Palatinate
- District: Südwestpfalz
- Municipal assoc.: Pirmasens-Land
- Subdivisions: 2

Government
  - Mayor (2019–24): Harald Hatzfeld (SPD)

Area
  - Total: 7.36 km^{2} (2.84 sq mi)
- Elevation: 300 m (980 ft)

Population (2025-12-31)
  - Total: 1,096
  - Density: 149/km^{2} (386/sq mi)
- Time zone: UTC+01:00 (CET)
  - Summer (DST): UTC+02:00 (CEST)
- Postal codes: 66957
- Dialling codes: 06335
- Vehicle registration: PS
- Website: www.trulben.de

Trulben is a municipality in Südwestpfalz district, in Rhineland-Palatinate, western Germany and belongs to the municipal association Pirmasens-Land.
