= Hornbach Abbey =

Coordinates: 49.186927°N 7.369601°E

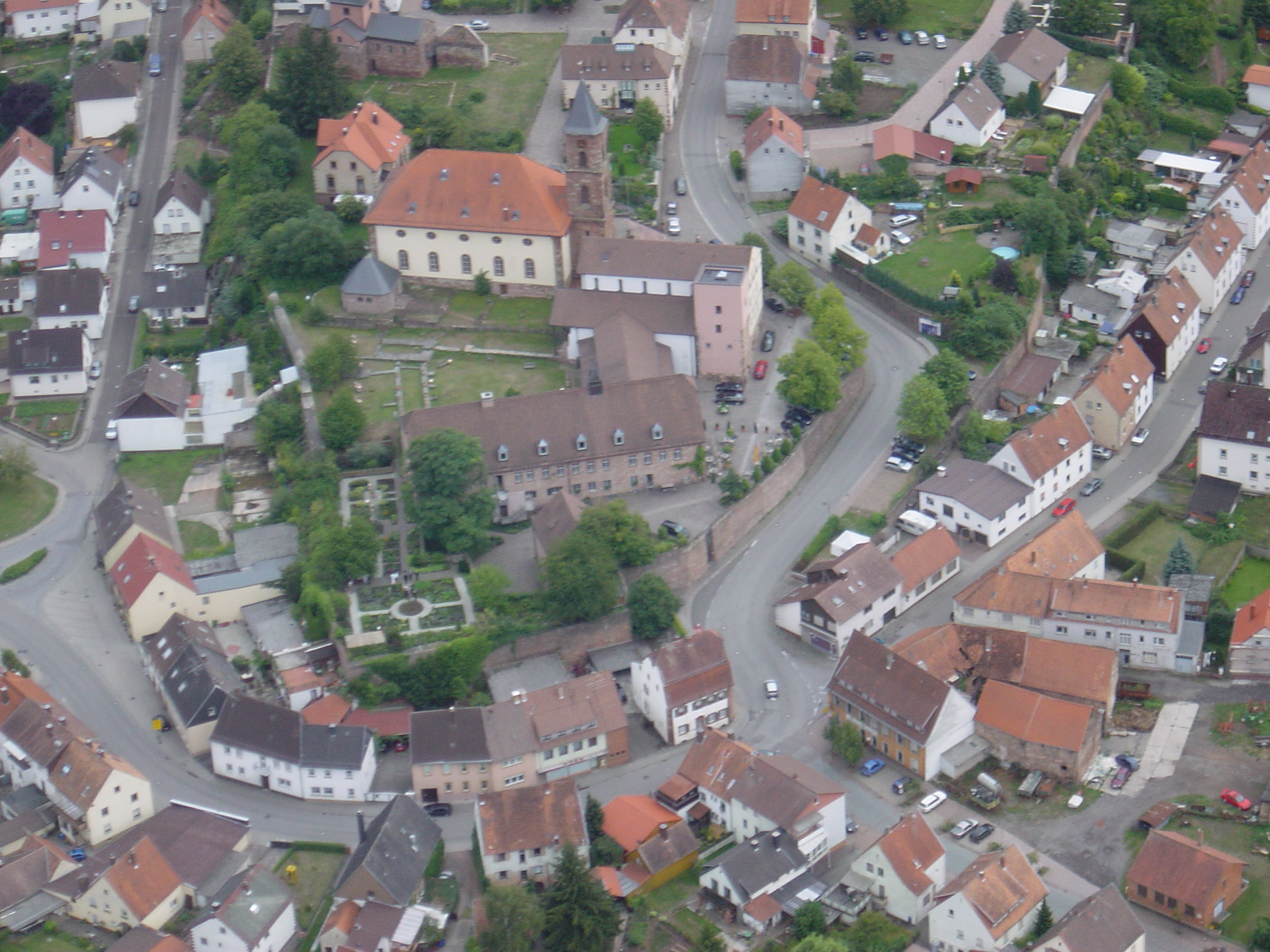

- Location within Rhineland-Palatinate Location within Germany
- Location: Pirmasens, Rhineland-Palatinate
- Country: Germany
- Denomination: Protestant Lutheran
- Previous denomination: Catholic

History
- Status: Convent
- Founded: 741
- Founder: Saint Pirmin

Hornbach Abbey (German: Kloster Hornbach) is a former monastery founded around 741 in the historic town of Gamundias (today Hornbach) by Saint Pirmin, which soon became a Benedictine abbey. The most important neighbouring abbeys were Bausendorf, Saint-Avold, Glandern, Villers-Bettnach, Fraulautern, Mettlach, Tholey, and the stift of St. Arnual. The neighboring spiritual centers were Trier and Metz. At present, all that remains of Hornbach Abbey are the structural remains of the convent buildings, which have been supplemented by a monastery museum, and a modern chapel with the historical tomb of the monastery's founder.

== History ==
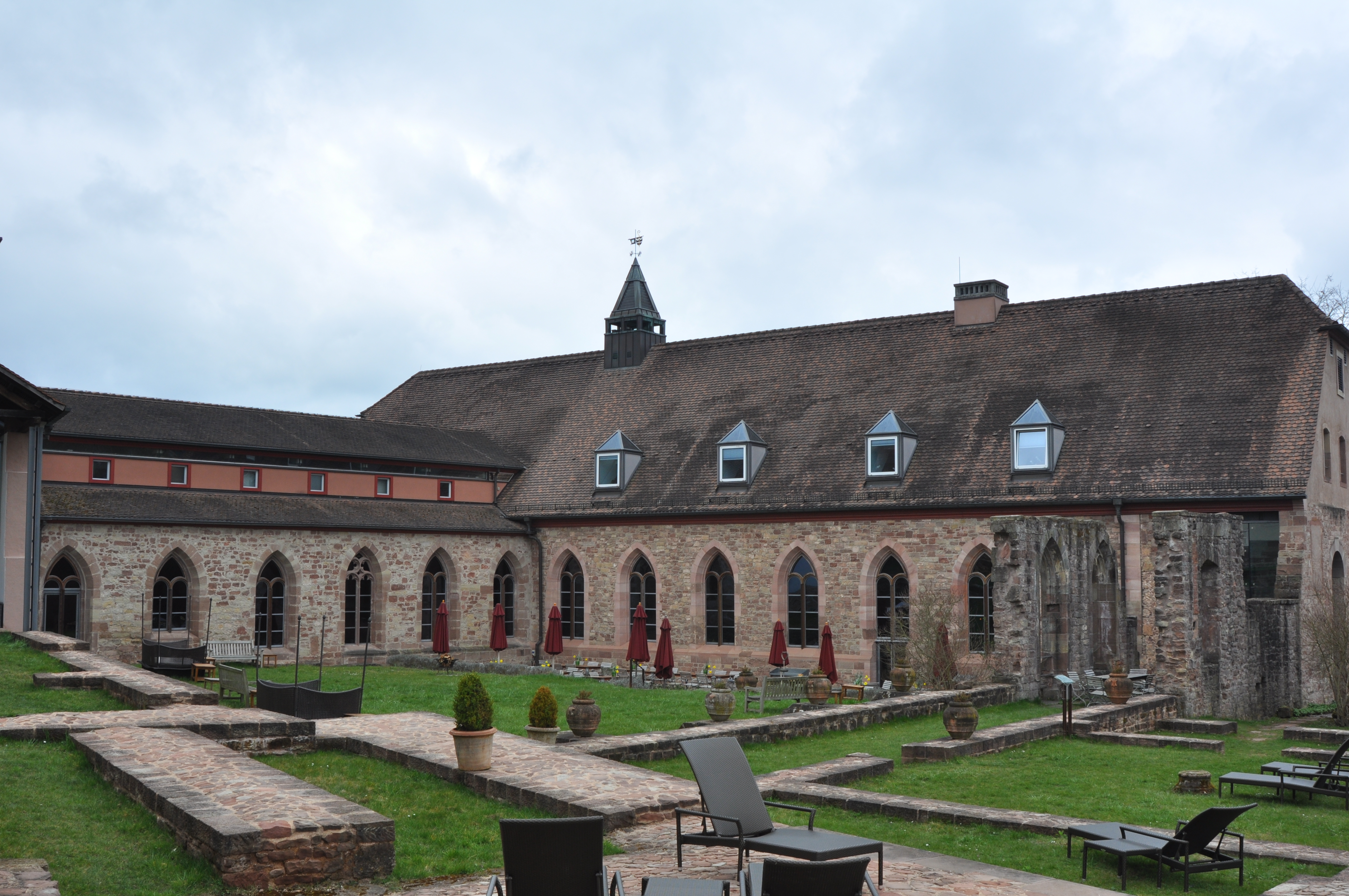
The rest of the convent building (right) and the cloister, both are integrated into a hotel; the foundations of the crossing tower in the foreground

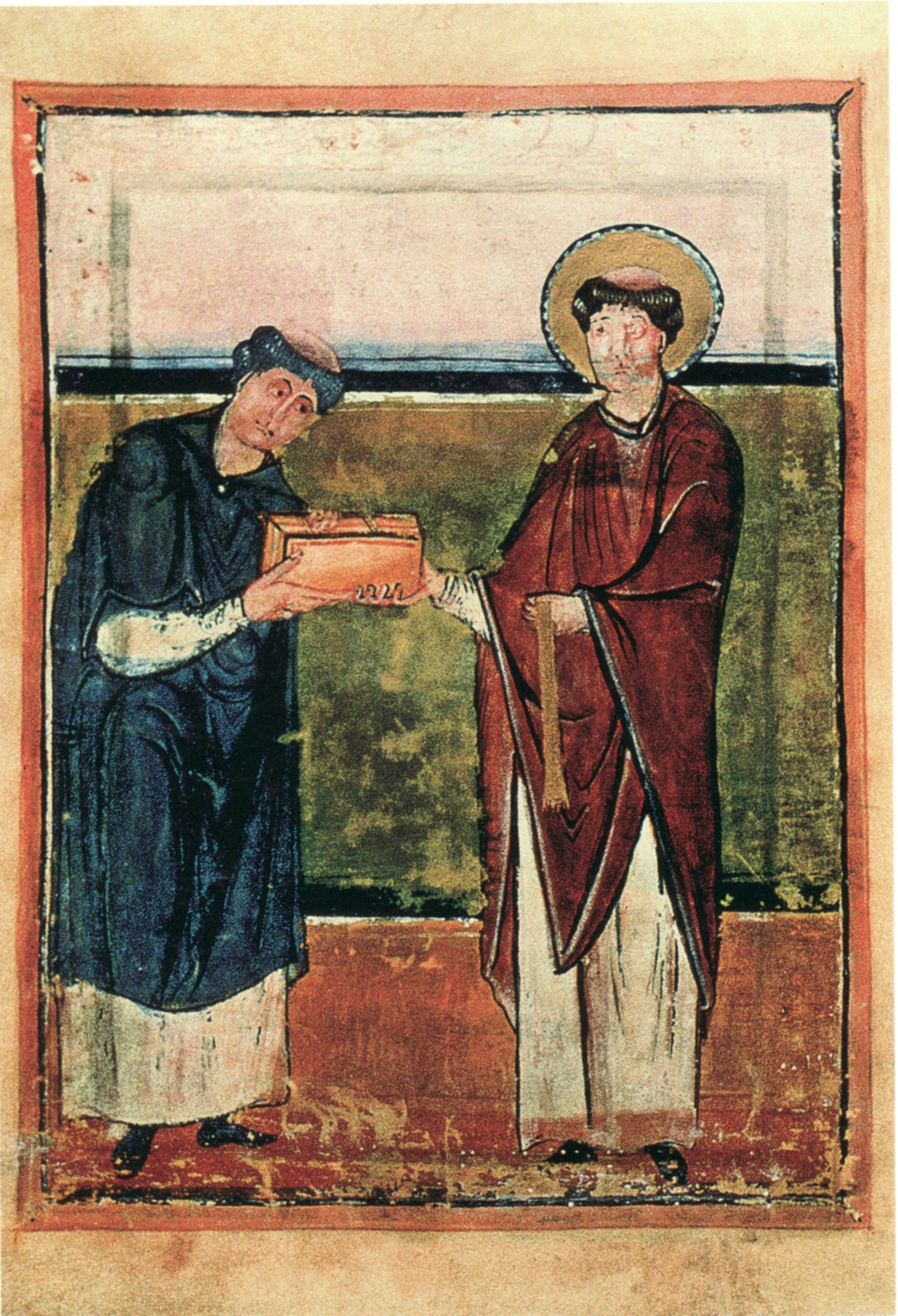
Painting from the Hornbach Sacramentary: The Hornbach Abbot Adalbert (left) hands over the Sacramentary to Saint Pirmin

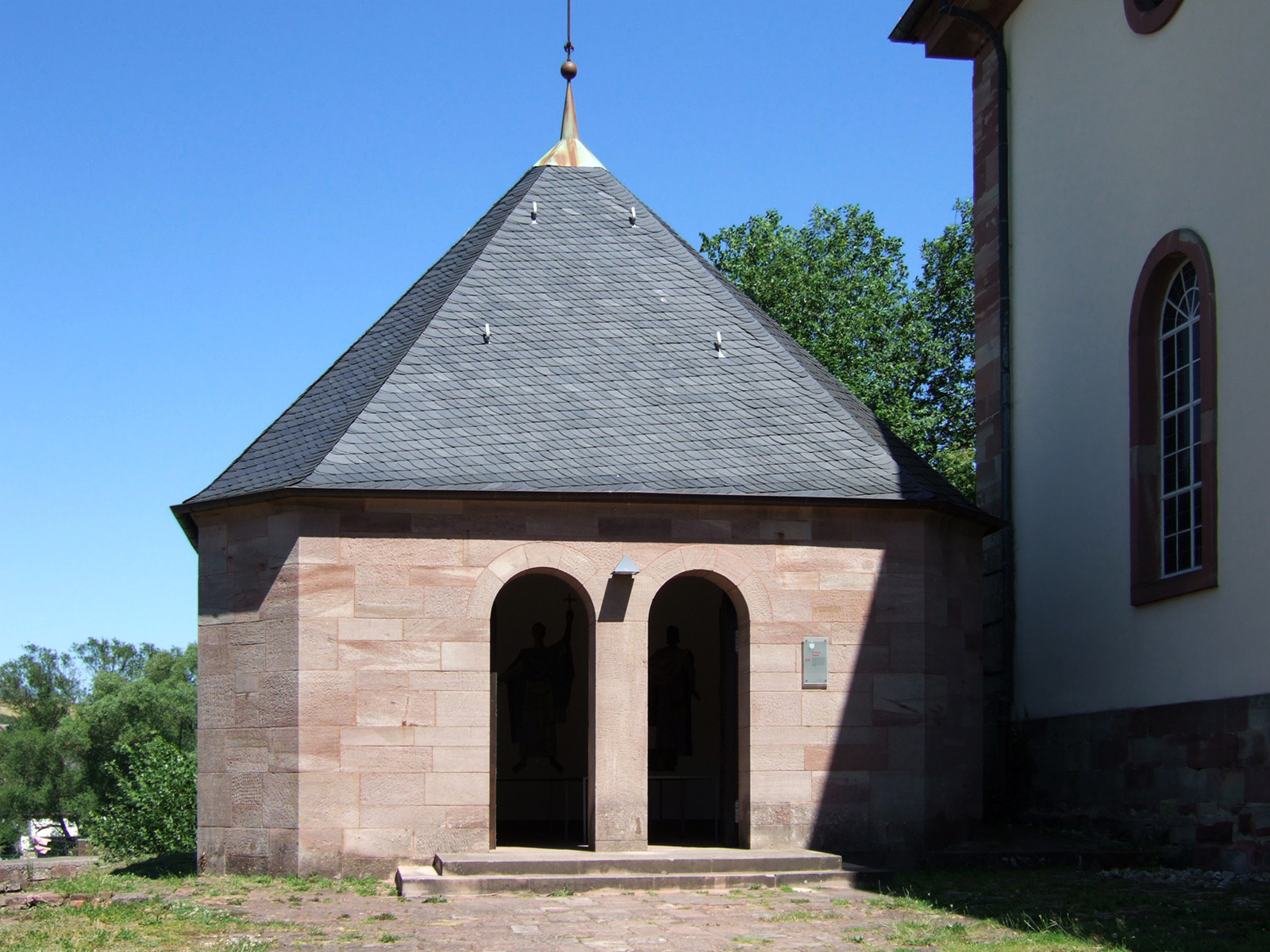
The modern chapel above Saint Pirmin's tomb

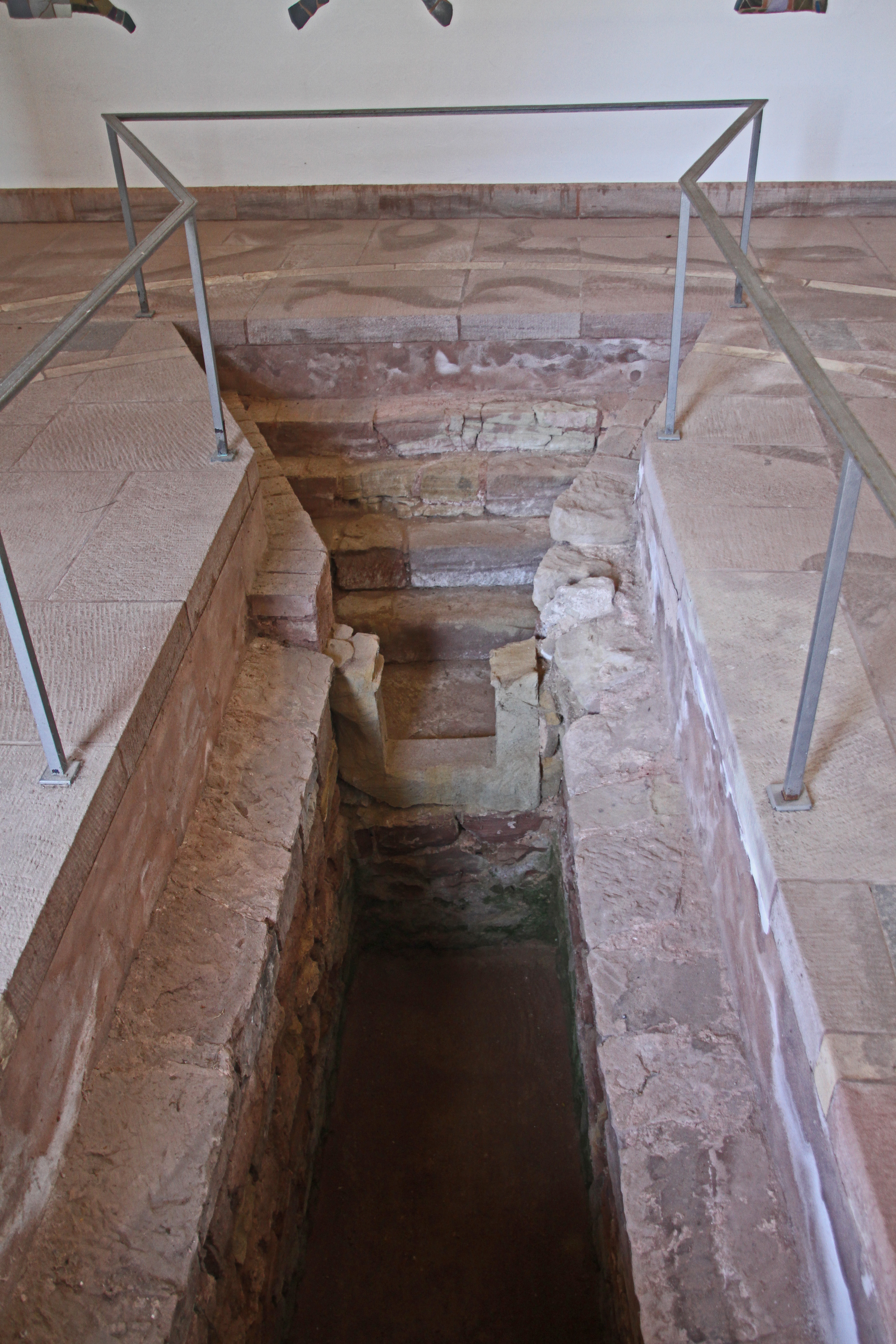
Empty Saint Pirmin's tomb in Hornbach

The village Gamundias had a Celtic and later a Roman settlement, each with a mountain sanctuary on the site on which the monastery would be built later; Roman coin finds prove Roman settlement from 496 AD.

Hornbach Abbey was part of the diocese of Metz. After the foundation of Murbach Abbey in 727 by Count Eberhard (Etichonids), Pirmin came to Gamundias around 740/741. There Count Warnharius (Widonids, ancestors of the Salians) donated the construction of a Benedictine monastery; Sigibald († 741), Bishop of Metz signed the deed of foundation and confirmed the monastery. As a monastery owned by the Salians, Hornbach Abbey enjoyed extensive privileges. After his death in 753, Saint Pirmin was buried in the monastery. With the emergence of his cult of veneration, its importance increased, as can be seen from several rebuildings and extensions, as well as from numerous documents that mention a tax payment to the monastery. The saint's tomb was moved to the eastern apse; from 827 Pirmin was named – along with Peter – as the patron saint of Hornbach Abbey. Around 850 the monastery was in charge of Zell Abbey near Worms, in the vicinity of which it also owned several churches and estates. In 1087, Emperor Henry IV gave Hornbach Abbey to the bishop of Speyer, Rüdiger Huzmann. In the 11th century, a monumental pillar basilica measuring 72 meters in length was built, which, in addition to the two apses, had five towers and a west building. Emperor Henry V granted the monastery the right to mint coins, which was exercised until about 1230. In the 12th century the building was renovated. The monastery gave important impulses for the development in Upper Lorraine, which is documented in numerous village and estate foundings by the monks. When it came under the influence of the County of Zweibrücken, its decline began.

In 1548 only three monks lived here and in 1557 – during the Reformation – Hornbach Abbey was finally abolished. The monastery assets, the current income and the monastery buildings were used to establish a state school, which was responsible for the education of new generations of pastors and higher civil servants needed in Palatinate-Zweibrücken, or to prepare them for university studies. In 1631 the school was moved to Zweibrücken. Afterwards the unused building fell into disrepair. Wars also led to further destruction; in the Franco-Dutch War, for example, French troops slighted the crossing tower of the basilica.

The Solothurn Central Library houses the so-called Hornbach Sacramentary, a codex of the 10th century, made by the Hornbach scribe monk Eburnant on behalf of his abbot Adalbert (approx. 970 to 990). Another precious manuscript preserved in Hornbach during the Middle Ages is the Codex Laudianus, a bilingual codex from around 600, which contains the Acts of the Apostles in Greek and Latin. It probably came to the continent with the British missionaries in the 8th century and came into the possession of William Laud ("Laudian Acts", today Oxford, Bodleian Library, Msc. Laud. Gr. 35) at the time of the Thirty Years' War.

== Present-day significance ==
Since 2000 the majority of the preserved monastery remains have been integrated into a hotel complex, and a monastery museum Historama Kloster Hornbach was established in the basement of the building to convey the history of the monastery.

The relics of Saint Pirmin were brought to Speyer in 1558 by the last abbot of Hornbach, Count Anton von Salm. From there they were brought to Innsbruck in 1575 by the former president of the Reichskammergericht (Imperial Chamber Court) and now governor of Tyrol, Count Schweikhard von Helfenstein. Today they are still kept there, in a modern shrine of the Innsbruck Jesuit Church. After the rediscovery of the Hornbach original tomb on the former abbey grounds in 1953, some of the bones were returned from there. Today they are kept in Hornbach, Speyer and Pirmasens. The Evangelical Church of the Palatinate, which owns the former abbey district, had a chapel built over the historic tomb in 1957, and it is now once again a place of pilgrimage.

To the empty tomb some steps lead down, ending in front of a contoured sandstone frame at the foot of the tomb niche. It is a window opening through which the pilgrims could touch the shrine of the saint. The tomb is considered the oldest known testimony of ecclesiastical architecture in the Palatinate.

== Bibliography ==
- Richard Antoni (2002), Leben und Taten des Bischofs Pirmin, Die karolingische Vita (Reichenauer Texte und Bilder, 9), ed. Walter Berschin, Stuttgart: Mattes-Verlag.
- Stefan Flesch (1991), Die monastische Schriftkultur der Saargegend im Mittelalter (Veröffentlichungen der Kommission für Saarländische Landesgeschichte und Volksforschung 20), Saarbrücken: Saarbrücker Drucker und Verleger. online
- Pia Heberer (2010), Das Kloster Hornbach in der Pfalz. Baugeschichte und Sakraltopographie, Mainz: Generaldirektion Kulturelles Erbe Rheinland-Pfalz|Generaldirektion Kulturelles Erbe – Rheinland-Pfalz, ISBN 978-3-936113-02-0.
- Franz Xaver Remling (1836), Urkundliche Geschichte der ehemaligen Abteien und Klöster im jetzigen Rheinbayern, Neustadt an der Haardt: Theil-Verlag, p. 53–87.
