= Eppenbrunn =

- Municipality
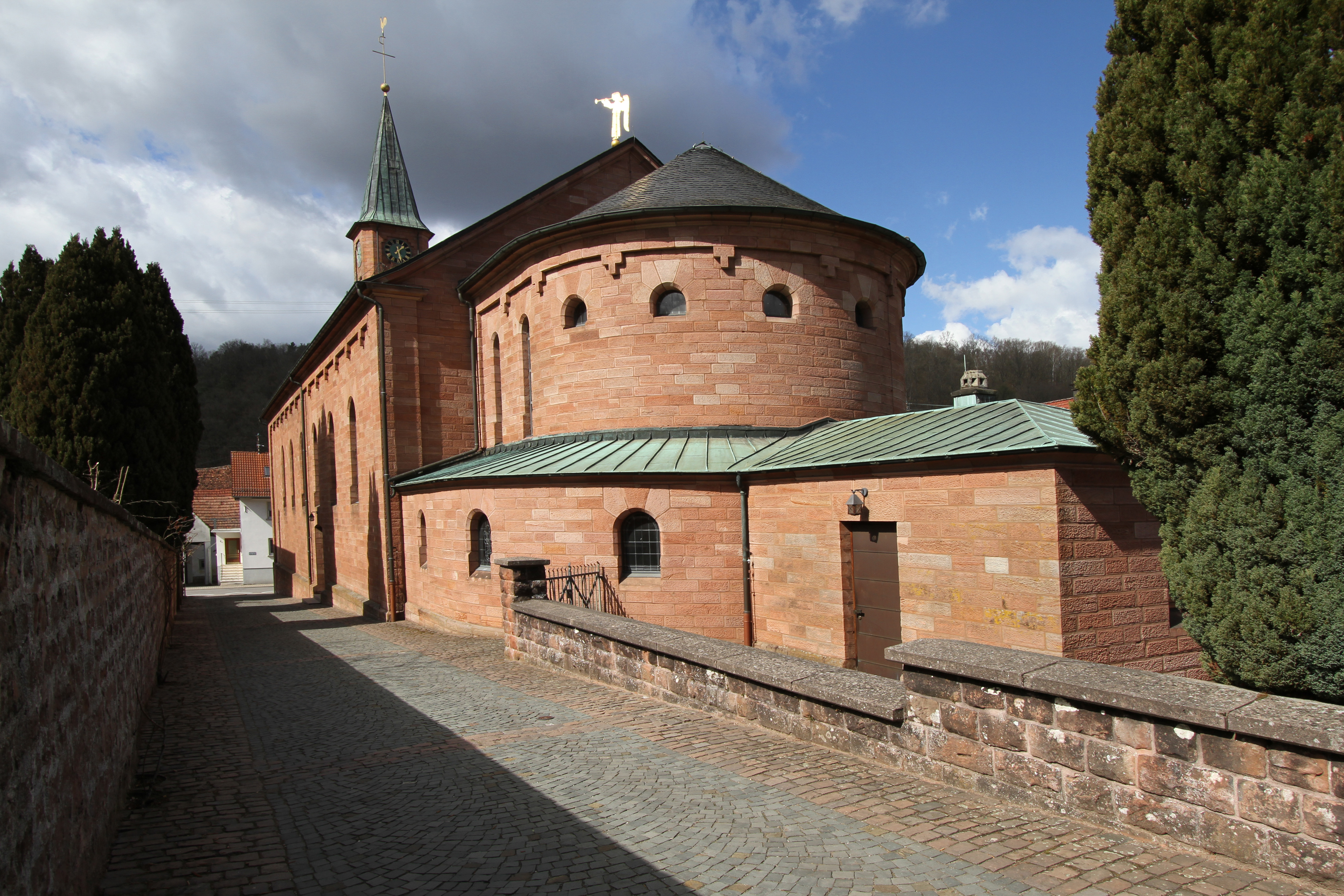

- Coat of arms

- Location of Eppenbrunn within Südwestpfalz district
- Interactive map of Eppenbrunn
- Location within Germany Location within Rhineland-Palatinate
- Coordinates: 49°7′N 7°34′E
- Country: Germany
- State: Rhineland-Palatinate
- District: Südwestpfalz
- Municipal assoc.: Pirmasens-Land
- Subdivisions: 2

Government
  - Mayor (2019–24): Andreas Pein (SPD)

Area
  - Total: 34.03 km^{2} (13.14 sq mi)
- Elevation: 285 m (935 ft)

Population (2025-12-31)
  - Total: 1,238
  - Density: 36.38/km^{2} (94.22/sq mi)
- Time zone: UTC+01:00 (CET)
  - Summer (DST): UTC+02:00 (CEST)
- Postal codes: 66957
- Dialling codes: 06335
- Vehicle registration: PS
- Website: pirmasens-land.de

Eppenbrunn is a municipality in Südwestpfalz district, in Rhineland-Palatinate, western Germany and belongs to the municipal association Pirmasens-Land.

Within the municipality is the 1.5 km long bunter sandstone formation called the Altschlossfelsen, which lies by the French border and was settled as early as Roman times.
