= Hilst =

- Municipality
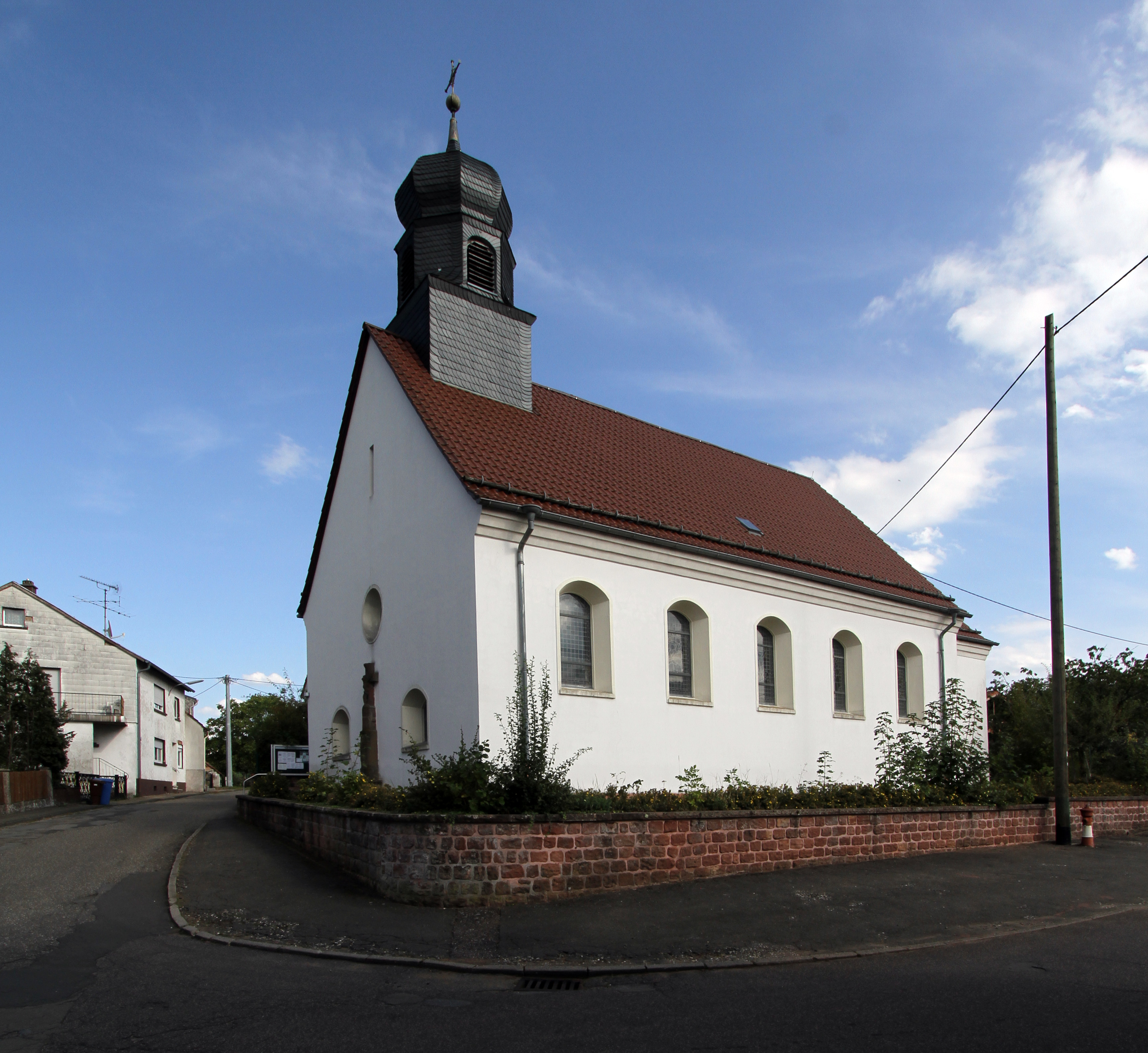

- Coat of arms

- Location of Hilst within Südwestpfalz district
- Interactive map of Hilst
- Location within Germany Location within Rhineland-Palatinate
- Coordinates: 49°7′24″N 7°31′44″E
- Country: Germany
- State: Rhineland-Palatinate
- District: Südwestpfalz
- Municipal assoc.: Pirmasens-Land

Government
  - Mayor (2022–24): Philipp Andreas

Area
  - Total: 3.37 km^{2} (1.30 sq mi)
- Elevation: 388 m (1,273 ft)

Population (2025-12-31)
  - Total: 309
  - Density: 91.7/km^{2} (237/sq mi)
- Time zone: UTC+01:00 (CET)
  - Summer (DST): UTC+02:00 (CEST)
- Postal codes: 66957
- Dialling codes: 06335
- Vehicle registration: PS
- Website: www.hilst.de

Hilst (German pronunciation: [hɪlst]) is a municipality in Südwestpfalz district, in Rhineland-Palatinate, western Germany and belongs to the municipal association Pirmasens-Land.
