= Schweix =

- Municipality
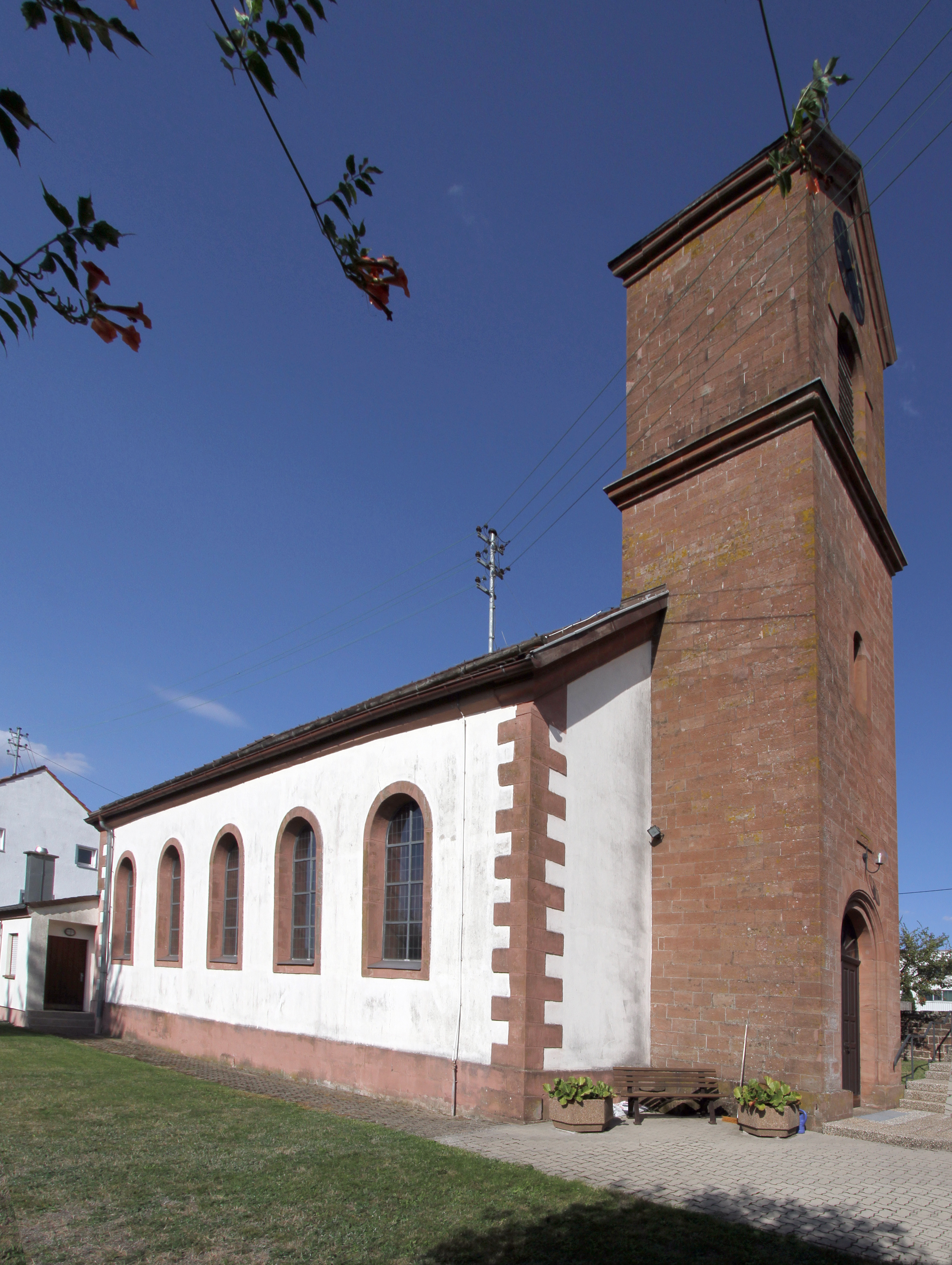

- Coat of arms

- Location of Schweix within Südwestpfalz district
- Interactive map of Schweix
- Location within Germany Location within Rhineland-Palatinate
- Coordinates: 49°07′35″N 07°30′43″E
- Country: Germany
- State: Rhineland-Palatinate
- District: Südwestpfalz
- Municipal assoc.: Pirmasens-Land

Government
  - Mayor (2019–24): Marco Maas

Area
  - Total: 3.73 km^{2} (1.44 sq mi)
- Elevation: 377 m (1,237 ft)

Population (2025-12-31)
  - Total: 279
  - Density: 74.8/km^{2} (194/sq mi)
- Time zone: UTC+01:00 (CET)
  - Summer (DST): UTC+02:00 (CEST)
- Postal codes: 66957
- Dialling codes: 06335
- Vehicle registration: PS
- Website: www.schweix.de

Schweix (German pronunciation: [ʃvaɪks]) is a municipality in Südwestpfalz district, in Rhineland-Palatinate, western Germany and belongs to the municipal association Pirmasens-Land.
