= Lindre-Haute =

- Commune
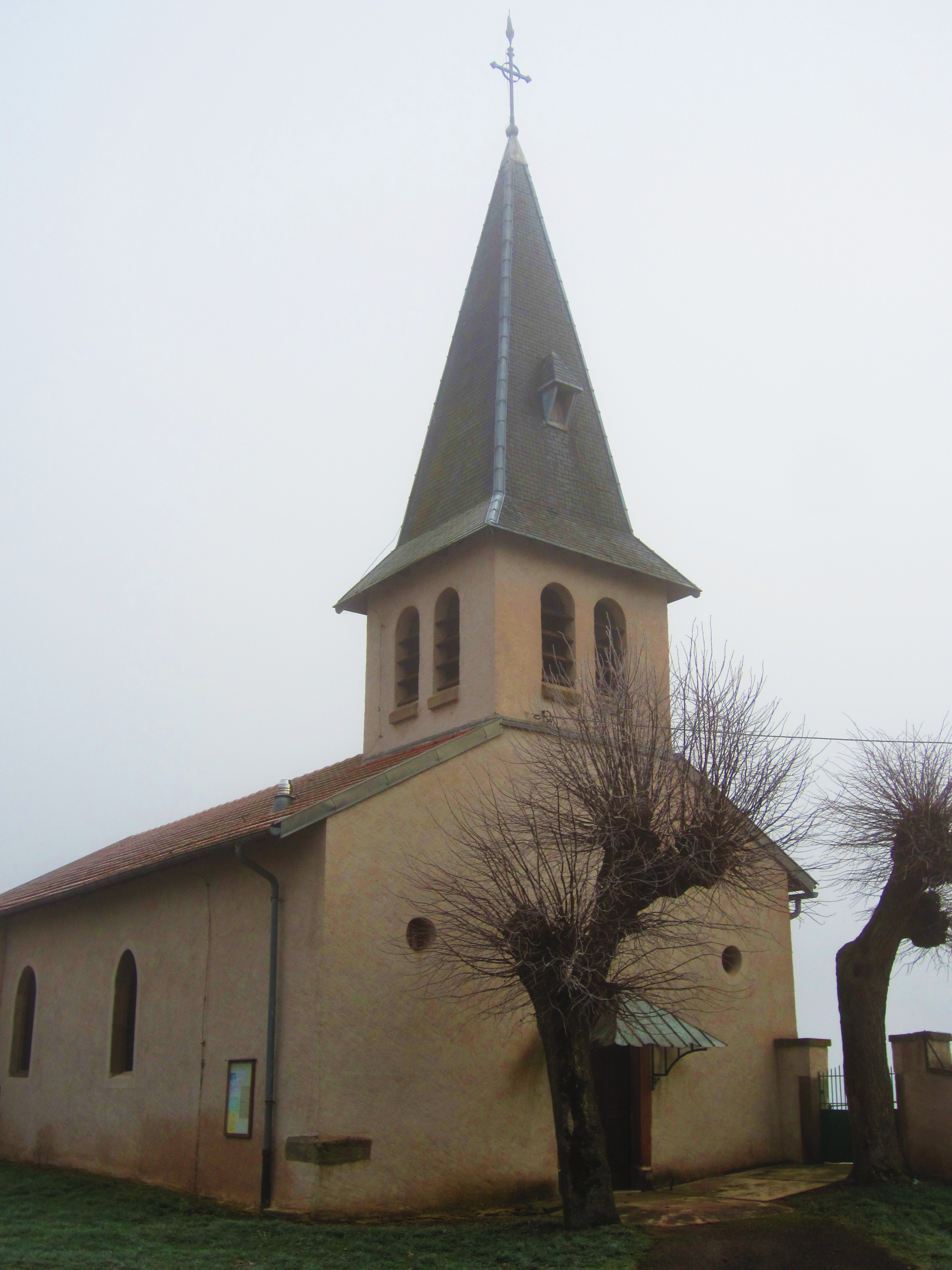
- The church in Lindre-Haute

- Coat of arms
- Location of Lindre-Haute
- Location within France Location within Grand Est
- Coordinates: 48°48′52″N 6°45′04″E
- Country: France
- Region: Grand Est
- Department: Moselle
- Arrondissement: Sarrebourg-Château-Salins
- Canton: Le Saulnois
- Intercommunality: CC du Saulnois

Government
  - Mayor (2020–2026): Olivier Guyon
- Area^{1}: 2.46 km^{2} (0.95 sq mi)
- Elevation: 220 m (720 ft)
- Highest elevation: 247 m (810 ft)
- Lowest elevation: 205 m (673 ft)
- Population (2023): 47
  - Density: 19/km^{2} (49/sq mi)
- Time zone: UTC+01:00 (CET)
  - Summer (DST): UTC+02:00 (CEST)
- INSEE/Postal code: 57405 /57260
- ^{1} French Land Register data, which excludes lakes, ponds, glaciers > 1 km^{2} (0.386 sq mi or 247 acres) and river estuaries.

Lindre-Haute (French pronunciation: [lɛ̃dʁ ot]; German: Ober-Linder) is a commune in the Moselle department in Grand Est in north-eastern France.

== See also ==
- Communes of the Moselle department
