= Lemberg, Germany =

Lemberg
- Municipality
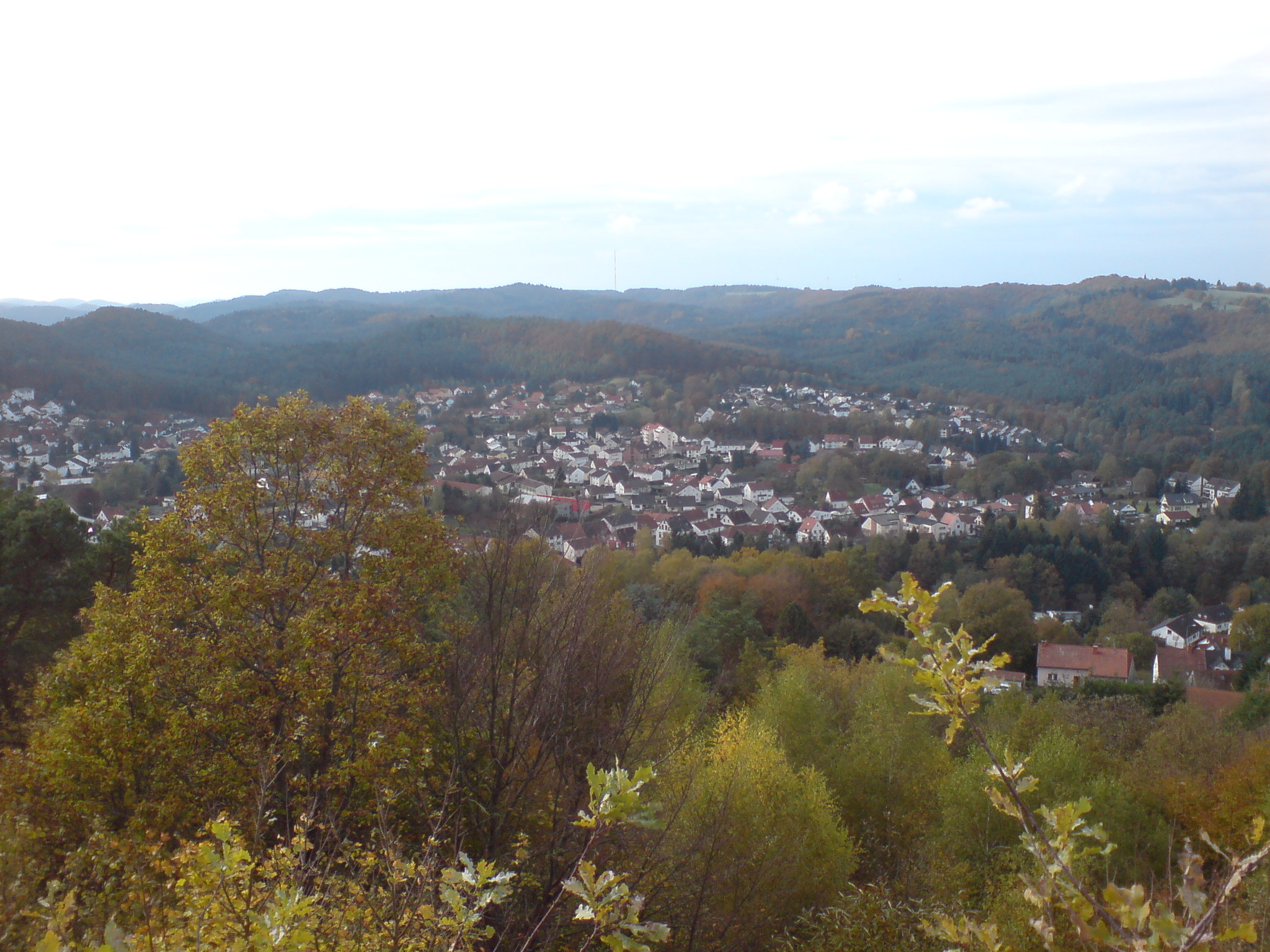

- Coat of arms

- Location of Lemberg within Südwestpfalz district
- Interactive map of Lemberg
- Location within Germany Location within Rhineland-Palatinate
- Coordinates: 49°10′N 7°39′E
- Country: Germany
- State: Rhineland-Palatinate
- District: Südwestpfalz
- Municipal assoc.: Pirmasens-Land

Government
  - Mayor (2019–24): Martin Niebuhr (SPD)

Area
  - Total: 58.18 km^{2} (22.46 sq mi)
- Elevation: 340 m (1,120 ft)

Population (2025-12-31)
  - Total: 3,451
  - Density: 59.32/km^{2} (153.6/sq mi)
- Time zone: UTC+01:00 (CET)
  - Summer (DST): UTC+02:00 (CEST)
- Postal codes: 66969
- Dialling codes: 06331
- Vehicle registration: PS

Lemberg (German pronunciation: [ˈlɛmbɛʁk]) is a municipality in Südwestpfalz district, in Rhineland-Palatinate, western Germany. Lemberg belongs to the municipal association Pirmasens-Land, where it is the largest local municipality in terms of both the area and the number of inhabitants. It is the sixth largest by population within the district and the second largest after the area after Wilgartswiesen. Lemberg is a state-recognized resort and an economic sub-centre.

In addition to the town of Lemberg, the municipality includes the villages of Glashütte, Langmühle and Salzwoog, each of which is represented by a local advisory board and a local councilor. The fourth district consists of the two hamlets Kettrichhof and Rodalberhof. Other populated localities are the settlements Am Soll and Gutenbach, as well as the homesteads of Altenwoogsmühle and Stephanshof.
