= Ruppertsweiler =

- Municipality
- Coat of arms

- Location of Ruppertsweiler within Südwestpfalz district
- Interactive map of Ruppertsweiler
- Location within Germany Location within Rhineland-Palatinate
- Coordinates: 49°11′49.1″N 7°41′6.2″E
- Country: Germany
- State: Rhineland-Palatinate
- District: Südwestpfalz
- Municipal assoc.: Pirmasens-Land

Government
  - Mayor (2019–24): Guido Hahn

Area
  - Total: 4.78 km^{2} (1.85 sq mi)
- Elevation: 306 m (1,004 ft)

Population (2025-12-31)
  - Total: 1,453
  - Density: 304/km^{2} (787/sq mi)
- Time zone: UTC+01:00 (CET)
  - Summer (DST): UTC+02:00 (CEST)
- Postal codes: 66957
- Dialling codes: 06395
- Vehicle registration: PS
- Website: www.ruppertsweiler.de

Ruppertsweiler is a municipality in Südwestpfalz district, in Rhineland-Palatinate, western Germany and belongs to the municipal association Pirmasens-Land.
