= Marimont-lès-Bénestroff =

- Commune
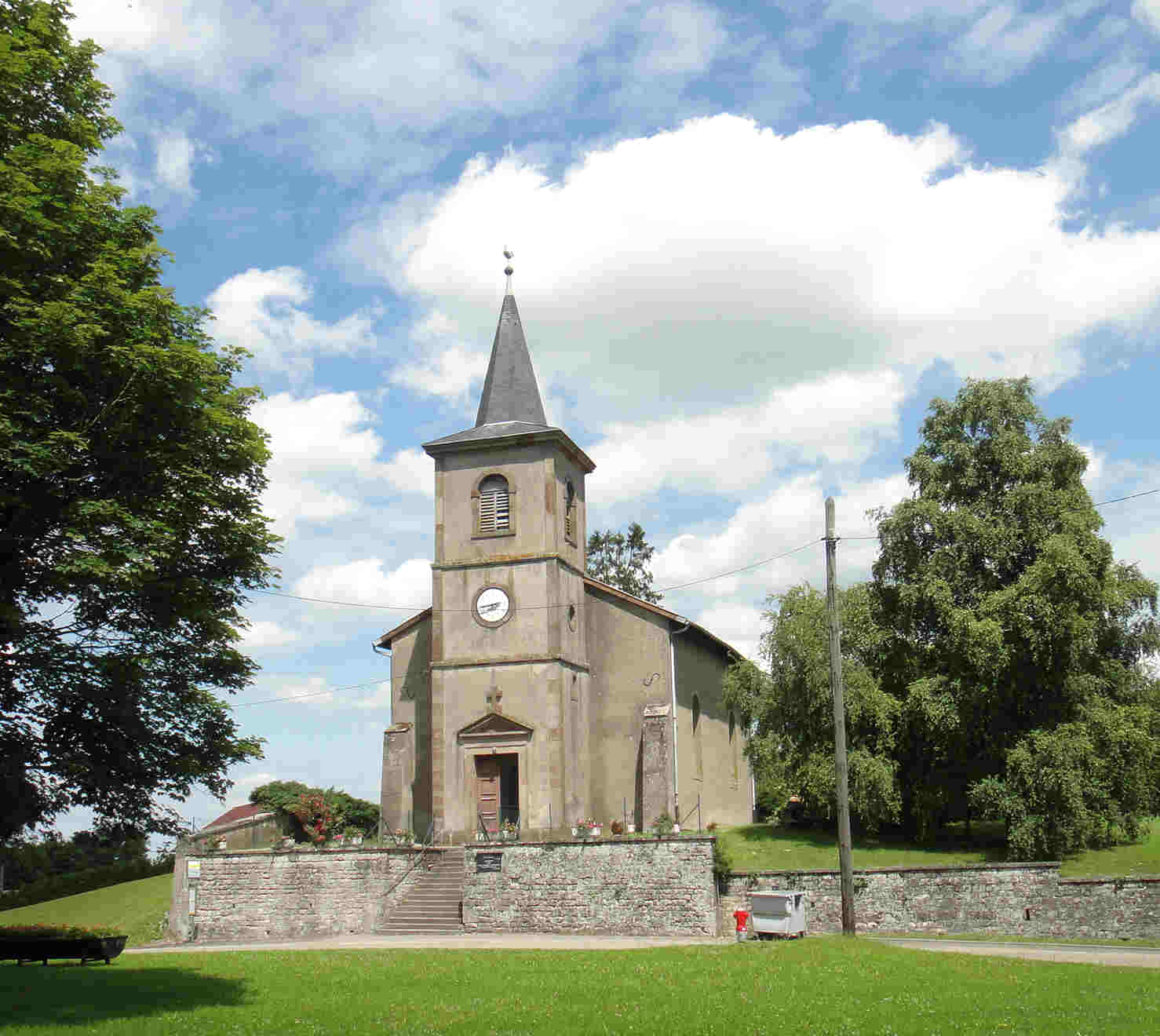
- The church in Marimont-lès-Bénestroff

- Coat of arms
- Location of Marimont-lès-Bénestroff
- Location within France Location within Grand Est
- Coordinates: 48°53′24″N 6°47′02″E
- Country: France
- Region: Grand Est
- Department: Moselle
- Arrondissement: Sarrebourg-Château-Salins
- Canton: Le Saulnois
- Intercommunality: CC du Saulnois

Government
  - Mayor (2020–2026): Marcel Amps
- Area^{1}: 3.99 km^{2} (1.54 sq mi)
- Elevation: 300 m (980 ft)
- Highest elevation: 330 m (1,080 ft)
- Lowest elevation: 239 m (784 ft)
- Population (2023): 56
  - Density: 14/km^{2} (36/sq mi)
- Time zone: UTC+01:00 (CET)
  - Summer (DST): UTC+02:00 (CEST)
- INSEE/Postal code: 57446 /57670
- ^{1} French Land Register data, which excludes lakes, ponds, glaciers > 1 km^{2} (0.386 sq mi or 247 acres) and river estuaries.

Marimont-lès-Bénestroff (French pronunciation: [maʁimɔ̃ lɛ benɛstʁɔf], literally Marimont near Bénestroff; German: Morsberg) is a commune in the Moselle department in Grand Est in north-eastern France.

== See also ==
- Communes of the Moselle department
