= Vinningen =

- Municipality
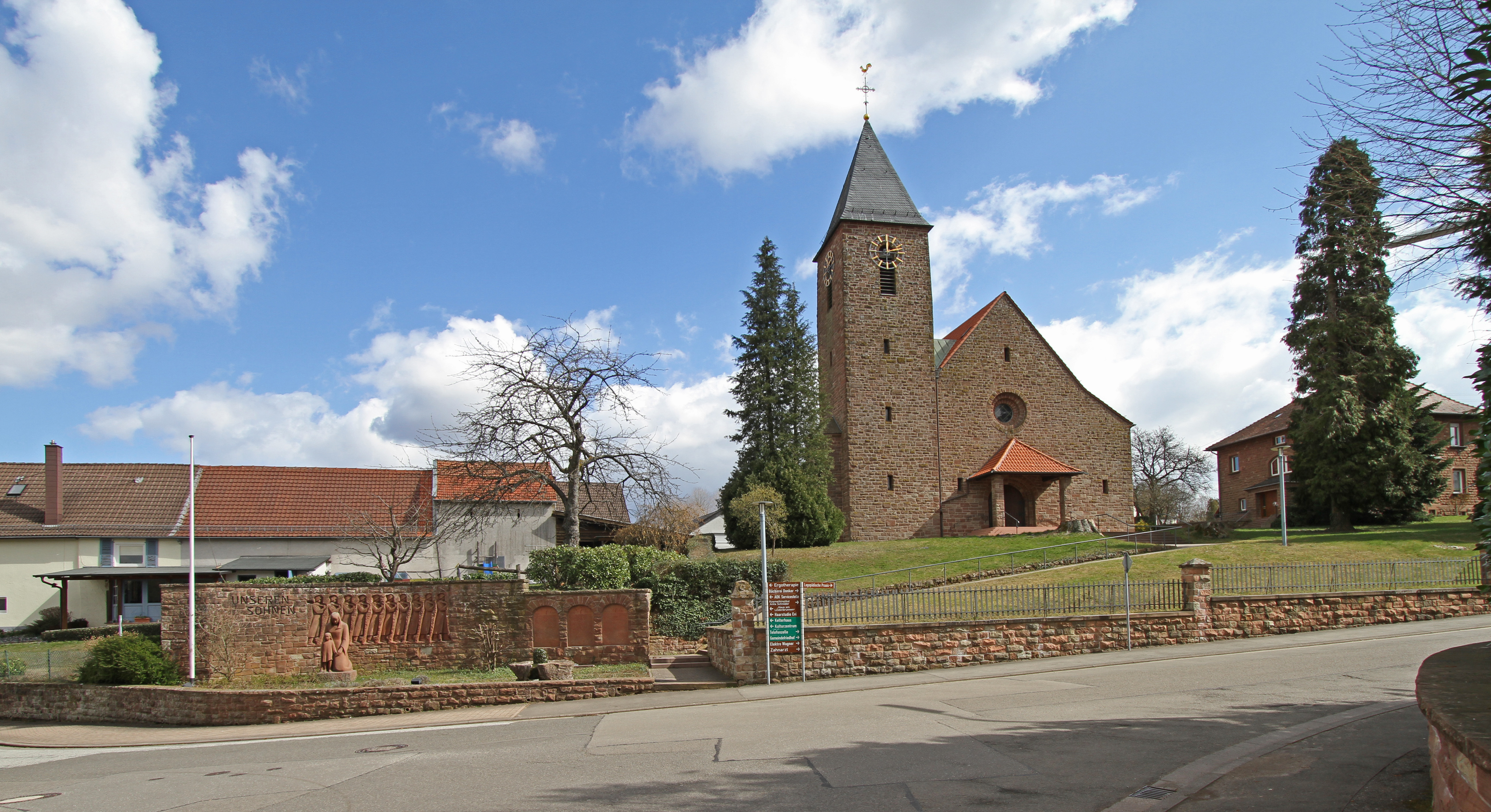

- Coat of arms

- Location of Vinningen within Südwestpfalz district
- Interactive map of Vinningen
- Location within Germany Location within Rhineland-Palatinate
- Coordinates: 49°9′21.99″N 7°33′5.12″E
- Country: Germany
- State: Rhineland-Palatinate
- District: Südwestpfalz
- Municipal assoc.: Pirmasens-Land

Government
  - Mayor (2019–24): Felix Kupper

Area
  - Total: 12.64 km^{2} (4.88 sq mi)
- Elevation: 440 m (1,440 ft)

Population (2025-12-31)
  - Total: 1,706
  - Density: 135.0/km^{2} (349.6/sq mi)
- Time zone: UTC+01:00 (CET)
  - Summer (DST): UTC+02:00 (CEST)
- Postal codes: 66957
- Dialling codes: 06335
- Vehicle registration: PS
- Website: www.vinningen.de

Vinningen (German pronunciation: [ˈfɪnɪŋən]) is a municipality in Südwestpfalz district, in Rhineland-Palatinate, western Germany and belongs to the municipal association Pirmasens-Land.
