= List of coats of arms with the Palatine Lion =

Palatine Lion

This list of coats of arms bearing the Palatine Lion includes municipal coats of arms as well as other shields and company logos which depict the Palatine Lion.

== The Palatine Lion in coats of arms of regional bodies and administrations ==
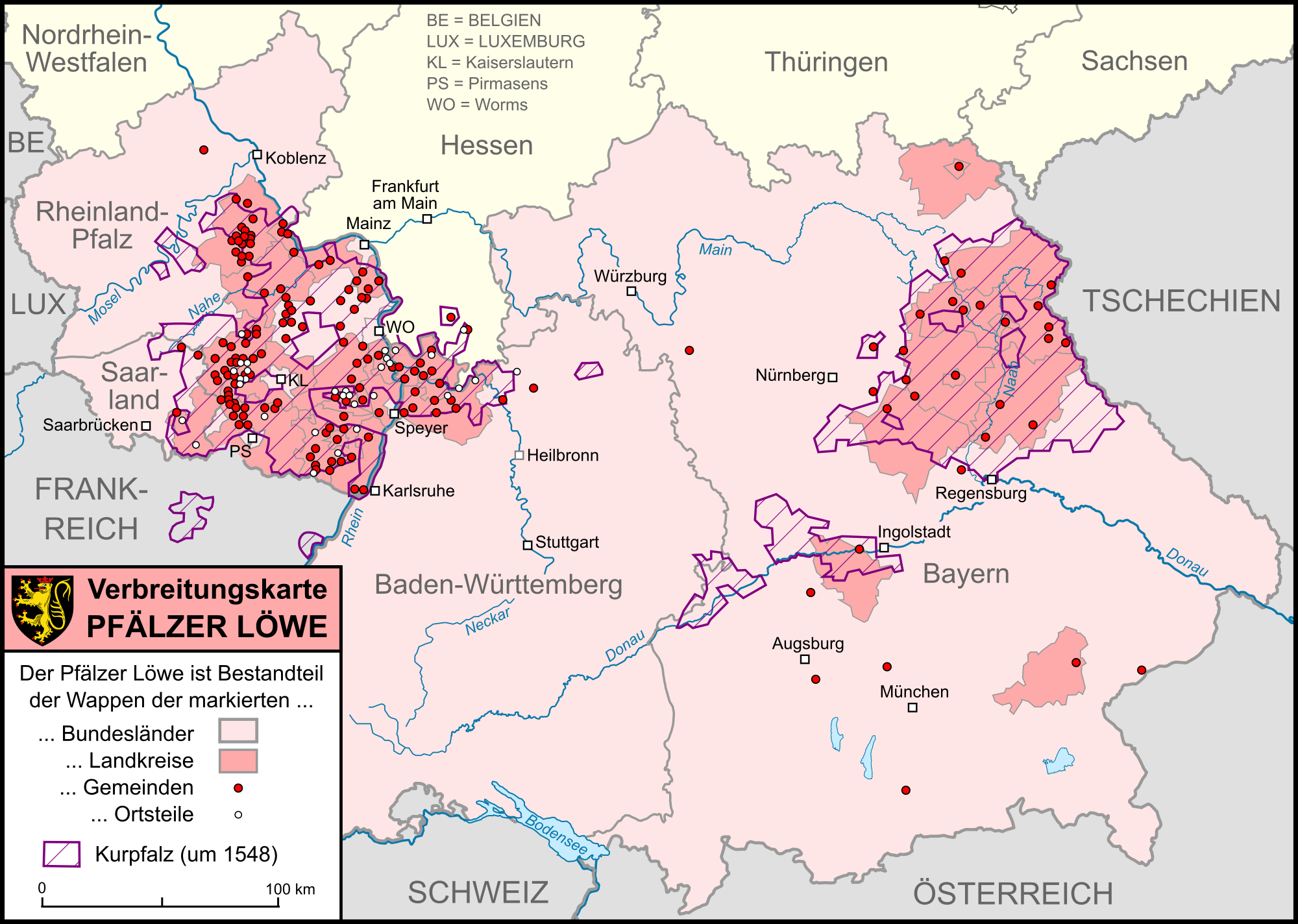
Distribution of the Palatine Lion emblem

Key to the columns

- Status:
  - Federal state = Federal state of Germany
  - Former municipality = former independent village parish (Ortsgemeinde)
  - former prov. = former province (Regierungsbezirk or Bezirk)
  - Higher ad. = higher level administration (höhere Kommunalverwaltung)
  - Former co. = former county (Landkreis)
  - parish = village/town district/parish and other administrative units at village level
  - VG = collective municipality (Verbandsgemeinde)
- Remarks:
  - Only used where there are variations from the normal design or to links to separate articles

| Coat of arms | Status | Name | VG / Co. / Prov. | State | Remarks |
|---|---|---|---|---|---|
| | town | Neustadt an der Weinstraße | Neustadt an der Weinstraße | Rhineland-Palatinate | |
| | town | Heidelberg | Heidelberg | Baden-Württemberg | on three green hills |
| | town | Pleystein | Neustadt an der Waldnaab | Bavaria | |
| | town | Schriesheim | Rhein-Neckar-Kreis | Baden-Württemberg | standing on two crossed diagonal arrows |
| | town | Altdorf bei Nürnberg | Nuremberg Land | Bavaria | bearing a shield |
| | village | Altrip | Rhein-Pfalz-Kreis | Rhineland-Palatinate | uncrowned, bears an escutcheon |
| | former municipality | Dilsberg part of Neckargemünd | Rhein-Neckar-Kreis | Baden-Württemberg | uncrowned, bears an escutcheon |
| | town | Frankenthal (Pfalz) | Frankenthal (Pfalz) | Rhineland-Palatinate | |
| | village | Horschbach | VG Altenglan | Rhineland-Palatinate | charged with a diagonal silver wavy line |
| | village | Lambsheim | Rhein-Pfalz-Kreis | Rhineland-Palatinate | uncrowned, bears an escutcheon |
| | higher ad. | Palatinate (provincial authority) | Palatinate region | Rhineland-Palatinate | |
| | former province | Rhenish Palatinate | | Kingdom of Bavaria | |
| | town | Bad Sobernheim | Bad Kreuznach | Rhineland-Palatinate | bearing the Wheel of Mainz in its forepaws |
| | higher ad. | Upper Bavaria | | Bavaria | |
| | village | Klosterkumbd | VG Simmern/Hunsrück | Rhineland-Palatinate | tail queue fourchy, bearing a golden sword |
| | village | Quirnbach/Pfalz | VG Glan-Münchweiler | Rhineland-Palatinate | uncrowned, regardant, colours reversed |
| | former co. | Mannheim | | Baden-Württemberg | |
| | town | Ludwigshafen | Ludwigshafen | Rhineland-Palatinate | uncrowned, armed gold, regardant, as shield bearer |
| | village | Flossenbürg | Neustadt an der Waldnaab | Bavaria | crowned and armed gules |
| | former municipality | Hammelbach part of Grasellenbach | Bergstraße | Hesse | |
| | town | Braunau am Inn | province Braunau am Inn | Upper Austria | |
| | town | Hof (Saale) | Hof (Saale) | Bavaria | |
| | town | Lindenfels | Bergstraße | Hesse | |
| | market town | Lauterhofen | Neumarkt in der Oberpfalz | Bavaria | two lions combattant |
| | federal state | Baden-Württemberg | | Baden-Württemberg | details |
| | village | Aspisheim | VG Sprendlingen-Gensingen | Rhineland-Palatinate | uncrowned |
| | village | Bechhofen (Pfalz) | VG Zweibrücken-Land | Rhineland-Palatinate | uncrowned |
| | village | Edingen-Neckarhausen | Rhein-Neckar-Kreis | Baden-Württemberg | uncrowned |
| | village | Föckelberg | VG Altenglan | Rhineland-Palatinate | charged with a diagonal silver wavy line |
| | collective municipality | Gau-Algesheim | Mainz-Bingen | Rhineland-Palatinate | |
| | town | Grafenwöhr | Neustadt an der Waldnaab | Bavaria | |
| | town | Mannheim | Mannheim | Baden-Württemberg | |
| | former municipality | Matzenbach | Landkreis Kusel | Rhineland-Palatinate | uncrowned, bears a golden millstone |
| | village | Nanzdietschweiler | VG Glan-Münchweiler | Rhineland-Palatinate | uncrowned |
| | village | Neunkirchen am Potzberg | VG Altenglan | Rhineland-Palatinate | |
| | village | Niederkumbd | VG Simmern/Hunsrück | Rhineland-Palatinate | uncrowned |
| | county | Rhein-Hunsrück-Kreis | | Rhineland-Palatinate | |
| | village | Rieschweiler-Mühlbach | VG Thaleischweiler-Fröschen – Wallhalben | Rhineland-Palatinate | |
| | county | Südwestpfalz | | Rhineland-Palatinate | |
| | former municipality | Moosbrunn part of Schönbrunn | Rhein-Neckar-Kreis | Baden-Württemberg | uncrowned, colours reversed, armed sable, langued gules |
| | county | Rhein-Neckar-Kreis | | Baden-Württemberg | colours reversed in order to comply with rule of tincture |
| | former municipality | Wagenschwend part of Limbach | Neckar-Odenwald-Kreis | Baden-Württemberg | uncrowned, colours reversed |
| | former co. | Sinsheim | | Baden-Württemberg | |
| | village | Dienheim | VG Rhein-Selz | Rhineland-Palatinate | |
| | village | Gondershausen | VG Emmelshausen | Rhineland-Palatinate | |
| | former municipality | Lützelsachsen part of Weinheim | Rhein-Neckar-Kreis | Baden-Württemberg | |
| | village | Maisborn | VG Emmelshausen | Rhineland-Palatinate | |
| | town | Mendig | VG Mendig | Rhineland-Palatinate | |
| | county | Neustadt an der Waldnaab | Upper Palatinate | Bavaria | |
| | village | Ohmbach | VG Schönenberg-Kübelberg | Rhineland-Palatinate | uncrowned |
| | former municipality | Oppau part of Ludwigshafen | Ludwigshafen | Rhineland-Palatinate | uncrowned, 1929 to 1938 |
| | town | Wiesloch | Rhein-Neckar-Kreis | Baden-Württemberg | uncrowned |
| | former municipality | Oppau part of Ludwigshafen | Ludwigshafen | Rhineland-Palatinate | to 1929 |
| | village | Altweidelbach | VG Simmern/Hunsrück | Rhineland-Palatinate | uncrowned |
| | village | Biedershausen | VG Thaleischweiler-Fröschen – Wallhalben | Rhineland-Palatinate | uncrowned |
| | village | Lohnweiler | VG Lauterecken-Wolfstein | Rhineland-Palatinate | |
| | village | Steinalben | VG Waldfischbach-Burgalben | Rhineland-Palatinate | uncrowned, contourné |
| | village | Traisen | VG Bad Münster am Stein-Ebernburg | Rhineland-Palatinate | crowned, bearing a grate |
| | village | Oberalben | VG Kusel | Rhineland-Palatinate | uncrowned, field azure |
| | village | Mutterschied | VG Simmern/Hunsrück | Rhineland-Palatinate | |
| | town | Bacharach | VG Rhein-Nahe | Rhineland-Palatinate | |
| | village | Konken | VG Kusel | Rhineland-Palatinate | uncrowned, field azure |
| | village | Laubach (Hunsrück) | VG Simmern/Hunsrück | Rhineland-Palatinate | tail queue fourchy, uncrowned |
| | village | Steinselz | (Arrondissement Weißenburg) | (Lower Alsace) | |
| | former Verbandsgemeinde | Nierstein-Oppenheim | Mainz-Bingen | Rhineland-Palatinate | |
| | village | Oberstaufenbach | VG Altenglan | Rhineland-Palatinate | uncrowned |
| | village | Bergheim (Upper Bavaria) | Neuburg-Schrobenhausen | Bavaria | |
| | village | Ilvesheim | Rhein-Neckar-Kreis | Baden-Württemberg | |
| | village | Lambsborn | Kaiserslautern | Rhineland-Palatinate | uncrowned |
| | village | Mengerschied | VG Simmern/Hunsrück | Rhineland-Palatinate | |
| | village | Obrigheim (Baden) | Neckar-Odenwald-Kreis | Baden-Württemberg | uncrowned |
| | village | Reifenberg | VG Thaleischweiler-Fröschen – Wallhalben | Rhineland-Palatinate | uncrowned |
| | village | Schefflenz | Neckar-Odenwald-Kreis | Baden-Württemberg | uncrowned |
| | village | Schmalenberg | VG Waldfischbach-Burgalben | Rhineland-Palatinate | uncrowned |
| | collective municipality | Waldfischbach-Burgalben | Südwestpfalz | Rhineland-Palatinate | uncrowned |
| | village | Seesbach | Bad Kreuznach | Rhineland-Palatinate | |
| | federal state | Rhineland-Palatinate | | Rhineland-Palatinate | details |
| | former collective municipality | Heßheim | Rhein-Pfalz-Kreis | Rhineland-Palatinate | uncrowned |
| | collective municipality | Lambsheim-Heßheim | Rhein-Pfalz-Kreis | Rhineland-Palatinate | uncrowned, bears an escutcheon |
| | village | Kollweiler | VG Weilerbach | Rhineland-Palatinate | uncrowned |
| | county | Mainz-Bingen | Mainz-Bingen | Rhineland-Palatinate | |
| | county | Kaiserslautern | Kaiserslautern | Rhineland-Palatinate | |
| | federal state | Bavaria | | Bavaria | uncrowned, for details see coat of arms of Bavaria |
| | village | Dirmstein | Bad Dürkheim | Rhineland-Palatinate | |
| | principality | Electorate of the Palatinate | | Holy Roman Empire | historic coat of arms |
| | village | Meckenheim | Bad Dürkheim | Rhineland-Palatinate | |
| | town | Auerbach in der Oberpfalz | Amberg-Sulzbach | Bavaria | |
| | town | Bärnau | Tirschenreuth | Bavaria | |
| | town | Eschenbach in der Oberpfalz | Neustadt an der Waldnaab | Bavaria | |
| | former municipality | Friesenheim part of Ludwigshafen | Ludwigshafen | Rhineland-Palatinate | uncrowned |
| | village | Haßloch | Bad Dürkheim | Rhineland-Palatinate | |
| | town | Kemnath | Tirschenreuth | Bavaria | |
| | collective municipality | Mendig | county Mayen-Koblenz | Rhineland-Palatinate | uncrowned, to 1973 |
| | market town | Moosbach | Neustadt an der Waldnaab | Bavaria | |
| | former municipality | Neckarhausen part of Edingen-Neckarhausen | Rhein-Neckar-Kreis | Baden-Württemberg | |
| | village | Niederotterbach | VG Bad Bergzabern | Rhineland-Palatinate | |
| | village | Oberotterbach | VG Bad Bergzabern | Rhineland-Palatinate | |
| | county | Saarpfalz-Kreis | | Saarland | |
| | town | Weiden in der Oberpfalz | Weiden in der Oberpfalz | Bavaria | |
| | collective municipality | Wachenheim | Bad Dürkheim | Rhineland-Palatinate | |
| | town | Leimen | Rhein-Neckar-Kreis | Baden-Württemberg | uncrownded, colours reversed |
| | village | Emmelshausen | VG Emmelshausen | Rhineland-Palatinate | |
| | collective municipality | Grünstadt-Land | Bad Dürkheim | Rhineland-Palatinate | |
| | former co. | Tauberbischofsheim | | Baden-Württemberg | |
| | former Verbandsgemeinde | Thaleischweiler-Fröschen | Südwestpfalz | Rhineland-Palatinate | |
| | village | Waldalgesheim | VG Rhein-Nahe | Rhineland-Palatinate | |
| | collective municipality | Freinsheim | Bad Dürkheim | Rhineland-Palatinate | |
| | village | Freisen | St. Wendel | Saarland | contourné |
| | collective municipality | Nieder-Olm | Mainz-Bingen | Rhineland-Palatinate | |
| | federal state | Saarland | | Saarland | Wappendetails |
| | market town | Schnaittach | Nürnberger Land | Bavaria | uncrowned, demi-lion |
| | village | Tiefenbach (Hunsrück) | VG Simmern/Hunsrück | Rhineland-Palatinate | uncrowned |
| | village | Wiesbach (Pfalz) | VG Zweibrücken-Land | Rhineland-Palatinate | uncrowned |
| | village | Grasellenbach | Bergstraße | Hesse | |
| | village | Heltersberg | VG Waldfischbach-Burgalben | Rhineland-Palatinate | uncrowned, contourné |
| | parish | Waldfischbach part of Waldfischbach-Burgalben | VG Waldfischbach-Burgalben | Rhineland-Palatinate | uncrowned, contourné |
| | village | Fronhofen | VG Simmern/Hunsrück | Rhineland-Palatinate | uncrowned, contourné, tail queue fourchée |
| | town | Dachau | Dachau | Bavaria | contourné |
| | former municipality | Sandhofen part of Mannheim | Mannheim | Baden-Württemberg | a lion or contourné, armed or, uncrowned, bears a bishop's crozier |
| | market town | Hohenfels | Oberpfalz | Bavaria | a lion or regardant, langued gules |
| | former municipality | Mußbach part of Neustadt (Weinstr.) | Neustadt an der Weinstraße | Rhineland-Palatinate | contourné, uncrowned |
| | village | Wallhalben | VG Thaleischweiler-Fröschen – Wallhalben | Rhineland-Palatinate | uncrowned, contourné |
| | village | Frankweiler | VG Landau-Land | Rhineland-Palatinate | contourné |
| | former municipality | Gimmeldingen part of Neustadt (Weinstr.) | Neustadt an der Weinstraße | Rhineland-Palatinate | contourné |
| | former municipality | Haardt part of Neustadt (Weinstr.) | Neustadt an der Weinstraße | Rhineland-Palatinate | contourné, uncrowned |
| | former co. | Heidelberg | | Baden-Württemberg | |
| | county | Hof | Oberfranken | Bavaria | contourné |
| | county | Kusel | | Rhineland-Palatinate | contourné, uncrowned |
| | former municipality | Lachen-Speyerdorf part of Neustadt (Weinstr.) | Neustadt an der Weinstraße | Rhineland-Palatinate | contourné, uncrowned |
| | county | Mühldorf am Inn | Upper Bavaria | Bavaria | contourné |
| | village | Neuerkirch | VG Simmern/Hunsrück | Rhineland-Palatinate | contourné |
| | county | Neumarkt in der Oberpfalz | Oberpfalz | Bavaria | contourné |
| | county | Tirschenreuth | Oberpfalz | Bavaria | contourné |
| | village | Schirmitz | Neustadt an der Waldnaab | Bavaria | contournéer Rumpf |
| | village | Barbelroth | VG Bad Bergzabern | Rhineland-Palatinate | contourné |
| | village | Birkenhördt | VG Bad Bergzabern | Rhineland-Palatinate | contourné |
| | former co. | Neustadt an der Weinstraße | | Rhineland-Palatinate | |
| | county | Rhein-Pfalz-Kreis | | Rhineland-Palatinate | contourné, uncrowned (to 2003 "Landkreis Ludwigshafen") |
| | village | Sargenroth | VG Simmern/Hunsrück | Rhineland-Palatinate | contourné, uncrowned |
| | county | Südliche Weinstraße | | Rhineland-Palatinate | contourné, uncrowned |
| | village | Külz (Hunsrück) | VG Simmern/Hunsrück | Rhineland-Palatinate | contourné, in blue with a church |
| | county | Bad Dürkheim | Bad Dürkheim | Rhineland-Palatinate | contourné |
| | village | Nohfelden | St. Wendel | Saarland | contourné |
| | county | Amberg-Sulzbach | Amberg-Sulzbach | Bavaria | contourné |
| | village | Bammental | Rhein-Neckar-Kreis | Baden-Württemberg | contourné, uncrowned |
| | town | Edenkoben | VG Edenkoben | Rhineland-Palatinate | contourné |
| | former co. | Frankenthal (Pfalz) | | Rhineland-Palatinate | |
| | village | Meckesheim | Rhein-Neckar-Kreis | Baden-Württemberg | contourné, armed or und uncrowned |
| | higher ad. | Upper Palatinate | Upper Palatinate provincial authority | Bavaria | contourné |
| | village | Rosenkopf | VG Zweibrücken-Land | Rhineland-Palatinate | uncrowned, contourné |
| | county | Schwandorf | Schwandorf | Bavaria | contourné |
| | former municipality | Waldhilsbach part of Neckargemünd | Rhein-Neckar-Kreis | Baden-Württemberg | contourné, uncrowned |
| | village | Walsheim | VG Landau-Land | Rhineland-Palatinate | contourné |
| | town | Weinheim | Rhein-Neckar-Kreis | Baden-Württemberg | contourné |
| | village | Heddesheim | Rhein-Neckar-Kreis | Baden-Württemberg | contourné |
| | village | Krähenberg | VG Thaleischweiler-Fröschen – Wallhalben | Rhineland-Palatinate | uncrowned, contourné |
| | village | Pleizenhausen | VG Simmern/Hunsrück | Rhineland-Palatinate | contourné, uncrowned |
| | former municipality | Böhl part of Böhl-Iggelheim | Rhein-Pfalz-Kreis | Rhineland-Palatinate | passant |
| | village | Brücken (Pfalz) | VG Schönenberg-Kübelberg | Rhineland-Palatinate | passant, bears a golden hammer |
| | village | Frettenheim | Alzey-Worms | Rhineland-Palatinate | passant |
| | village | Kümbdchen | VG Simmern/Hunsrück | Rhineland-Palatinate | passant |
| | town | Lambrecht | Bad Dürkheim | Rhineland-Palatinate | obere Hälfte, passant |
| | town | Simmern/Hunsrück | VG Simmern/Hunsrück | Rhineland-Palatinate | passant |
| | collective municipality | Simmern/Hunsrück | Rhein-Hunsrück-Kreis | Rhineland-Palatinate | passant |
| | market town | Bruck in der Oberpfalz | Schwandorf | Bavaria | passant |
| | village | Schlammersdorf | Neustadt an der Waldnaab | Bavaria | passant |
| | village | Altlußheim | Rhein-Neckar-Kreis | Baden-Württemberg | uncrowned demi-lion, with a bishop's crozier |
| | town | Bad Tölz | Bad Tölz-Wolfratshausen | Bavaria | demi-lion, uncrowned |
| | village | Ilbesheim | VG Landau-Land | Rhineland-Palatinate | uncrowned, demi-lion from a triple hill issuant |
| | village | Selzen | VG Rhein-Selz | Rhineland-Palatinate | demi-lion, bearing a key argent |
| | town | Alzey | Alzey-Worms | Rhineland-Palatinate | demi-lion |
| | town | Amberg | Amberg | Bavaria | demi-lion |
| | village | Dorn-Dürkheim | VG Rhein-Selz | Rhineland-Palatinate | demi-lion |
| | village | Eimsheim | VG Rhein-Selz | Rhineland-Palatinate | demi-lion |
| | village | Erdesbach | VG Altenglan | Rhineland-Palatinate | demi-lion |
| | county | Germersheim | | Rhineland-Palatinate | demi-lion |
| | village | Heinzenhausen | VG Lauterecken-Wolfstein | Rhineland-Palatinate | demi-lion |
| | village | Hochborn | Alzey-Worms | Rhineland-Palatinate | demi-lion |
| | town | Hockenheim | Rhein-Neckar-Kreis | Baden-Württemberg | demi-lion |
| | village | Kirchenpingarten | Bayreuth | Bavaria | demi-lion, bears a skep |
| | former municipality | Oberhochstadt | Hochstadt (Pfalz) | Rhineland-Palatinate | demi-lion, bears a fusil argent (to 1969) |
| | town | Schwandorf | Schwandorf | Bavaria | demi-lion |
| | collective municipality | Sprendlingen-Gensingen | Mainz-Bingen | Rhineland-Palatinate | azure field |
| | market town | Eslarn | Neustadt an der Waldnaab | Bavaria | uncrowned, demi-lion |
| | village | Biebelnheim | Alzey-Worms | Rhineland-Palatinate | demi-lion |
| | village | Harthausen | Rhein-Pfalz-Kreis | Rhineland-Palatinate | two demi-lions, cf. the older coat of arms |
| | (older coat of arms) | Harthausen | Rhein-Pfalz-Kreis | Rhineland-Palatinate | 1845–1951, two uncrowned lions combattant, bearing a millstone |
| | former municipality | Niedereisenbach | Landkreis Kusel | Rhineland-Palatinate | demi-lion, uncrowned |
| | village | Alfeld (Mittelfranken) | Nürnberger Land | Bavaria | demi-lion |
| | village | Steindorf | Aichach-Friedberg | Bavaria | demi-lion |
| | collective municipality | Alzey-Land | Alzey-Worms | Rhineland-Palatinate | demi-lion |
| | village | Belgweiler | VG Simmern/Hunsrück | Rhineland-Palatinate | demi-lion, uncrowned |
| | village | Manubach | VG Rhein-Nahe | Rhineland-Palatinate | demi-lion, bearing an escutcheon |
| | village | Undenheim | VG Rhein-Selz | Rhineland-Palatinate | |
| | village | Berg bei Neumarkt in der Oberpfalz | Neumarkt in der Oberpfalz | Bavaria | demi-lion |
| | village | Glanbrücken | VG Lauterecken-Wolfstein | Rhineland-Palatinate | demi-lion, uncrowned |
| | village | Erharting | Mühldorf am Inn | Bavaria | demi-lion |
| | village | Höheischweiler | VG Thaleischweiler-Fröschen – Wallhalben | Rhineland-Palatinate | demi-lion, uncrowned |
| | former Verbandsgemeinde | Wallhalben | Südwestpfalz | Rhineland-Palatinate | uncrowned, demi-lion |
| | collective municipality | Annweiler am Trifels | Südliche Weinstraße | Rhineland-Palatinate | demi-lion |
| | former co. | Ludwigshafen | | Rhineland-Palatinate | demi-lion, uncrowned, bearing a golden key |
| | village | Münchweiler am Klingbach | VG Annweiler am Trifels | Rhineland-Palatinate | uncrowned, demi-lion |
| | county | Neuburg-Schrobenhausen | Upper Bavaria | Bavaria | demi-lion |
| | collective municipality | Rhein-Nahe | Mainz-Bingen | Rhineland-Palatinate | |
| | collective municipality | Deidesheim | Bad Dürkheim | Rhineland-Palatinate | demi-lion |
| | collective municipality | Hettenleidelheim | Bad Dürkheim | Rhineland-Palatinate | demi-lion |
| | village | Niederheimbach | VG Rhein-Nahe | Rhineland-Palatinate | demi-lion |
| | village | Albersweiler | VG Annweiler am Trifels | Rhineland-Palatinate | uncrowned, contourné, demi-lion |
| | town | Schwetzingen | Rhein-Neckar-Kreis | Baden-Württemberg | contourné, uncrowned, demi-lion |
| | town | Freinsheim | Bad Dürkheim | Rhineland-Palatinate | contourné, demi-lion |
| | collective municipality | Bad Bergzabern | Südliche Weinstraße | Rhineland-Palatinate | demi-lion, uncrowned, contourné |
| | market town | Laaber | Regensburg | Bavaria | head only |
| | village | Baar | Aichach-Friedberg | Bavaria | head only |
| | village | Schwarzenbach (Oberpfalz) | Neustadt an der Waldnaab | Bavaria | head only |
| | village | Hirschbach | Amberg-Sulzbach | Bavaria | head only |
| | market town | Burglengenfeld | Schwandorf | Bavaria | head only, cabossed |
| | town district | Mörsch part of Frankenthal (Pfalz) | Frankenthal (Pfalz) | Rhineland-Palatinate | |
| | town district | Mörsch part of Frankenthal (Pfalz) | Frankenthal (Pfalz) | Rhineland-Palatinate | |
| | town district | Oggersheim part of Ludwigshafen | Ludwigshafen | Rhineland-Palatinate | |
| | town district | Grevenhausen part of Lambrecht (Pfalz) | Ludwigshafen | Rhineland-Palatinate | |
| | village | Wachenheim an der Weinstraße | Bad Dürkheim | Rhineland-Palatinate | |
| | former co. | Landkreis Rockenhausen | | Rhineland-Palatinate | |
| | village | Niedermoschel | Donnersbergkreis | Rhineland-Palatinate | |
| | village | Oberndorf | Donnersbergkreis | Rhineland-Palatinate | |
| | village | Sitters | Donnersbergkreis | Rhineland-Palatinate | |
| | village | Einselthum | Donnersbergkreis | Rhineland-Palatinate | |
| | village | Mörsfeld | Donnersbergkreis | Rhineland-Palatinate | |
| | collective municipality | Rockenhausen | Donnersbergkreis | Rhineland-Palatinate | |
| | village | Dielkirchen | Donnersbergkreis | Rhineland-Palatinate | |
| | village | Gundersweiler | Donnersbergkreis | Rhineland-Palatinate | |
| | village | Ransweiler | Donnersbergkreis | Rhineland-Palatinate | |
| | village | Ruppertsecken | Donnersbergkreis | Rhineland-Palatinate | |
| | village | Bellheim | Germersheim | Rhineland-Palatinate | |
| | village | Berg (Pfalz) | Germersheim | Rhineland-Palatinate | |
| | village | Neuburg am Rhein | Germersheim | Rhineland-Palatinate | |
| | village | Erlenbach bei Kandel | Germersheim | Rhineland-Palatinate | |
| | village | Winden | Germersheim | Rhineland-Palatinate | |
| | collective municipality | Bruchmühlbach-Miesau | Kaiserslautern | Rhineland-Palatinate | |
| | village | Bruchmühlbach-Miesau | Kaiserslautern | Rhineland-Palatinate | |
| | village | Frankelbach | Kaiserslautern | Rhineland-Palatinate | |
| | collective municipality | Ramstein-Miesenbach | Kaiserslautern | Rhineland-Palatinate | |
| | village | Hütschenhausen | Kaiserslautern | Rhineland-Palatinate | |
| | former municipality | Hütschenhausen part of Hütschenhausen | Kaiserslautern | Rhineland-Palatinate | |
| | former municipality | Katzenbach part of Hütschenhausen | Kaiserslautern | Rhineland-Palatinate | |
| | former municipality | Spesbach part of Hütschenhausen | Kaiserslautern | Rhineland-Palatinate | |
| | village | Niedermohr | Kaiserslautern | Rhineland-Palatinate | |
| | former municipality | Niedermohr part of Niedermohr | Kaiserslautern | Rhineland-Palatinate | |
| | former municipality | Reuschbach part of Niedermohr | Kaiserslautern | Rhineland-Palatinate | |
| | village | Ramstein-Miesenbach | Kaiserslautern | Rhineland-Palatinate | |
| | former municipality | Ramstein part of Ramstein-Miesenbach | Kaiserslautern | Rhineland-Palatinate | |
| | village | Steinwenden | Kaiserslautern | Rhineland-Palatinate | |
| | former municipality | Steinwenden-Weltersbach part of Steinwenden | Kaiserslautern | Rhineland-Palatinate | |
| | former municipality | Weltersbach part of Steinwenden | Kaiserslautern | Rhineland-Palatinate | |
| | former municipality | Reichenbach part of Reichenbach-Steegen | Kaiserslautern | Rhineland-Palatinate | uncrowned |
| | former municipality | Fockenberg-Limbach part of Reichenbach-Steegen | Kaiserslautern | Rhineland-Palatinate | uncrowned |
| | former co. | Zweibrücken | | Rhineland-Palatinate | |
| | village | Battweiler | Südwestpfalz | Rhineland-Palatinate | |
| | former co. | Bad Bergzabern | | Rhineland-Palatinate | |
| | former co. | Landau | | Rhineland-Palatinate | |
| | former municipality | Gräfenhausen part of Annweiler am Trifels | Südliche Weinstraße | Rhineland-Palatinate | |
| | village | Dörrenbach | Südliche Weinstraße | Rhineland-Palatinate | |
| | former municipality | Rechtenbach part of Schweigen-Rechtenbach | Südliche Weinstraße | Rhineland-Palatinate | |
| | former municipality | Mühlhofen part of Billigheim-Ingenheim | Südliche Weinstraße | Rhineland-Palatinate | |
| | village | Hallgarten | Bad Kreuznach | Rhineland-Palatinate | |
| | village | Oberhausen an der Nahe | Bad Kreuznach | Rhineland-Palatinate | |
| | former co. | St. Ingbert | | Saarland | |
| | former municipality | Bliesdalheim part of Gersheim | Saarpfalz-Kreis | Saarland | |
| | town | St. Ingbert | Saarpfalz-Kreis | Saarland | |
| | former municipality | Hassel part of St. Ingbert | Saarpfalz-Kreis | Saarland | |
| | county | Bad Kreuznach | | Rhineland-Palatinate | |
| | collective municipality | Traben-Trarbach | Kreis Bernkastel-Wittlich | Rhineland-Palatinate | |
| | former municipality | Pfalzdorf part of Goch | Kreis Kleve | North Rhine-Westphalia | |
| | former municipality | Ibersheim part of Worms | Worms | Rhineland-Palatinate | |
| | former municipality | Rheindürkheim part of Worms | Worms | Rhineland-Palatinate | |
| | village | Albig | Alzey-Worms | Rhineland-Palatinate | demi-lion |
| | village | Freimersheim (Rheinhessen) | Alzey-Worms | Rhineland-Palatinate | holding the letter "F" in its forepaws |
| | collective municipality | Rheinauen | Rhein-Pfalz-Kreis | Rhineland-Palatinate | uncrowned, bears an escutcheon |
| | Verbandsgemeinde | Rhein-Selz | Landkreis Mainz-Bingen | Rheinland-Pfalz | |
| | former municipality | Merzhausen part of Usingen | Hochtaunuskreis | Hesse | |

== The Palatine Lion in coats of arms of the German Armed Forces ==
| Coat of arms | Unit | Location |
|---|---|---|
| | Landeskommando of Rhineland-Palatinate | in Mainz in the Generalfeldzeugmeister Barracks |

== See also ==
- Electoral Rhenish Circle
- Wappenbuch des Landkreises Cochem-Zell, Darmstadt 2001, v. Alfons Friderichs, ISBN 3-00-008064-3
