= Wallhalben (Verbandsgemeinde) =

Coordinates: 49.316°N 7.527°E

Wallhalben is a former Verbandsgemeinde ("collective municipality") in the Südwestpfalz district, in Rhineland-Palatinate, Germany. The seat of the municipality was in Wallhalben. On 1 July 2014 it merged into the new Verbandsgemeinde Thaleischweiler-Wallhalben.

The Verbandsgemeinde Wallhalben consisted of the following Ortsgemeinden ("local municipalities"):

1. Biedershausen
2. Herschberg
3. Hettenhausen
4. Knopp-Labach
5. Krähenberg
6. Obernheim-Kirchenarnbach
7. Saalstadt
8. Schauerberg
9. Schmitshausen
10. Wallhalben
11. Weselberg
12. Winterbach
