= Thaleischweiler-Fröschen (Verbandsgemeinde) =

Municipality in Rhineland-Palatinate, Germany

Coordinates: 49.263°N 7.583°E

Thaleischweiler-Fröschen is a former Verbandsgemeinde ("collective municipality") in the Südwestpfalz district, in Rhineland-Palatinate, Germany. The seat of the municipality was in Thaleischweiler-Fröschen. On 1 July 2014 it merged into the new Verbandsgemeinde Thaleischweiler-Wallhalben.

The Verbandsgemeinde Thaleischweiler-Fröschen consisted of the following Ortsgemeinden ("local municipalities"):

1. Höheischweiler
2. Höhfröschen
3. Maßweiler
4. Nünschweiler
5. Petersberg
6. Reifenberg
7. Rieschweiler-Mühlbach
8. Thaleischweiler-Fröschen
