= Sickingen Heights =

Coordinates: 49°19′32″N 7°30′36″E

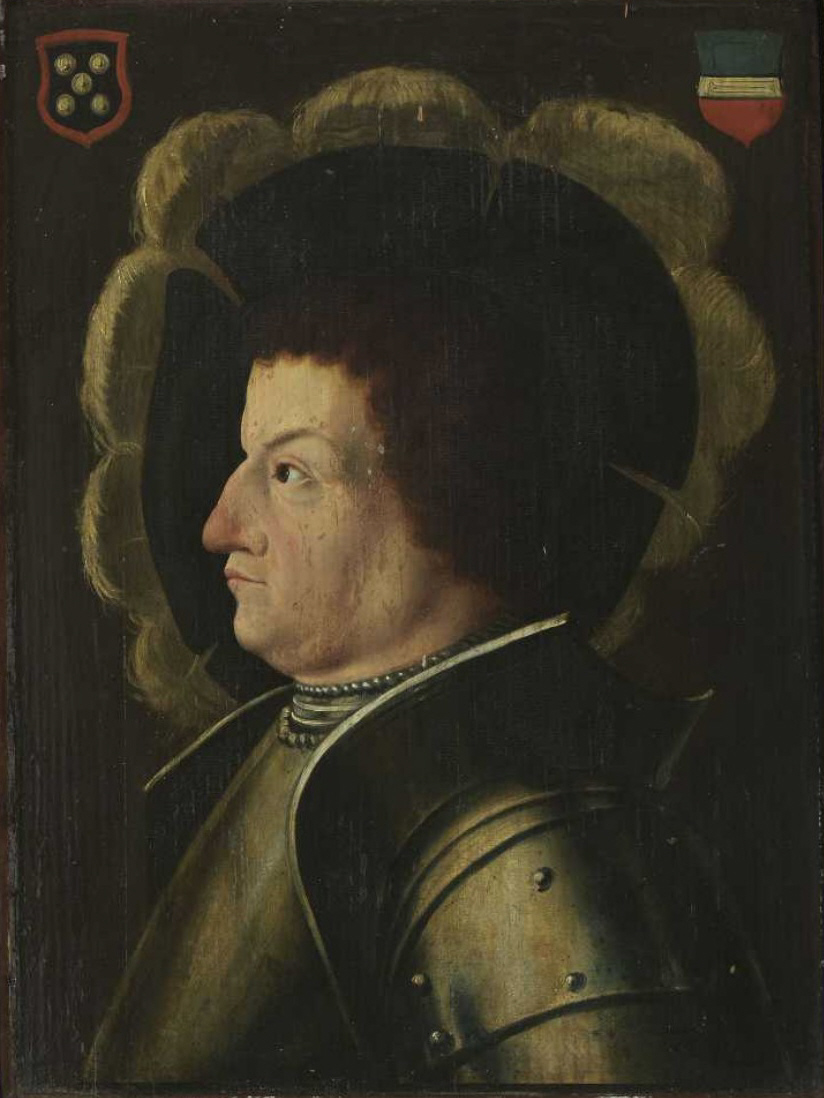
Franz von Sickingen, best known member of the House of Sickingen

The Sickingen Heights (German: Sickinger Höhe) form a landscape in the western part of the German state of Rhineland-Palatinate. The region was named after the family of imperial knight, Franz von Sickingen (1481–1523), because most of the area belonged to the territory of the House of Sickingen in the Middle Ages.

== Geography ==
=== Location ===
The Sickingen Heights form the northern part of the Westrich Plateau; about a third of the area within the county of Kaiserslautern and two-thirds in the county of Südwestpfalz. It extends from Sickingen's town of Landstuhl in the north almost to the town of Zweibrücken in the south and from the border between Rhineland-Palatinate and the Saarland in the west to the Palatinate Forest in the east.

=== Geology ===
The Sickingen Heights belong to the major region known as the Palatine-Saarland Muschelkalk Region (Pfälzisch-Saarländisches Muschelkalkgebiet). The hilly plateau, which lies at heights from 300 to 430 m above sea level (NN) descends very steeply in the north in several, densely wooded, escarpments to the Landstuhl Marsh. Numerous small and medium-sized rock formations from the bunter sandstone of the Karlstal beds outcrop along the escarpment, for example the Heidenfelsen near Hauptstuhl, the eponymous rocks near Bärenloch in Kindsbach or the rock landscape in the Fleischackerloch near Landstuhl. Somewhat less rugged in appearance is the plateau's westward transition to the Saarland and even less than that in the east, where the valley of the Moosalb forms the boundary. In the south the Sickingen Heights transition almost seamlessly into the Zweibrücken Hills.

=== Rivers and streams ===
Much of the Sickingen Heights is drained southwards by the Moosalb, Wallhalb and Auerbach into the Schwarzbach and then via the Blies, Saar and Moselle into the Rhine. The Lambsbach flows westwards directly into the Blies.

== Sights and culture ==
- In the old schoolhouse at Queidersbach, built in 1836, is the Sickingen Heights Museum (Museum Sickinger Höhe). Opened in 1976 and covering an area of 500 m^{2}, the museum offers an overview of history of the region from early times until the recent past.
- In 1869, the Krähenberg Meteorite fell in the eponymous parish. At the site of the impact there is a commemorative stone with an information board about the event, Since 2009 the Meteorite Trail (Winterbach–Krähenberg–Kleinbundenbach–Großbundenbach–Zweibrücken) has been established as a themed walk.
- In Herschberg every two years, the Wallhaben collective municipality hosts the Sickingen Dialect Poetry Competition (Sickinger Mundartdichter-Wettstreit).

== Settlement and transportation ==
The land is sparsely settled and the only large towns occur on the lower-lying perimeter of the plateau. There are no pan-regional transport routes, except for a mostly two-lane section of the A 62 motorway Landstuhl–Pirmasens.

Due to its remoteness, the region is well suited for hiking e.g. along the Mill Trail in the Wallhalb Valley. Over the Sickingen Heights runs the waymarked North Route of the Palatine sections of the historic Way of St. James.
