= Kurpfalz (region) =

Region in Germany

The Kurpfalz region in modern Germany is where the Kurpfalz dialect is spoken. In a narrower sense, it is where the former Electoral Palatinate (the original Kurpfalz) was: the areas around Mannheim and Heidelberg.

The modern Kurpfalz does not have defined borders, which is the same for Schwaben, but the Kurpfalz and the Palatinate are separated by the Rhine.

== Etymology ==
The name Pfalz "Palatine" comes from Rome's Palatine Hill, which was the nucleus of the Roman Empire and its ruling class. Pfalz originates from the term Kaiserpfalz "royal court", which is similar to a castle. During the Holy Roman Empire, Kaiserpfalzen were built in important locations as secondary seats of power for the Emperor, or, rarely, for bishops wielding Landeshoheit "territorial rights".

The name "Kurpfalz" emerged only after the Golden Bull of 1356, in which the functions of the prince-elector were defined for the Palatinate county by the Rhine.

== Dialect ==
The Kurpfälzer are usually considered to be speakers of a dialect rather than an ethnic group. The reason is that many scattered areas belonging to the historical Kurpfalz along the Oberrhein, the Mittelrhein and the Moselle, often possess their own identity. Nowadays, parts of the former electorate are located in Baden-Württemberg, Rheinland-Pfalz, Hessen, Bavaria and Alsace. These divisions emerged as early as 1800 during the Coalition Wars, when the right bank of the Rhine became a part of the Baden electorate, and, the left bank went to the First French Empire and later to the Kingdom of Bavaria. Often, the definition of the Kurpfälzer is used to define these inhabitants of Baden-Württemberg as opposed to Franconia in the east, the Württemberger (i.e., Schwaben) in the south-east and the Badenern in the south. Although the Kurpfälzer are frequently associated with the Badener, they do not see themselves as such.

"Kurpfälzisch" is spoken on the right bank of the Rhine. The difference to the Pfalz dialect spoken on the left bank is minimal. The Palatinate language area extends from Mannheim and Viernheim in the north to Weinheim, Heidelberg and Wiesloch towards Bruchsal in the south. In the east, it reaches the Baden Odenwald from Neckargemünd to Eberbach, Mosbach and Sinsheim. Approximately 1,500,000 people live in the area where Kurpfälzisch language is spoken.

== History ==
The historical Electoral Palatinate has its roots in the Rhenish-Lorraine Palatinate, the core areas of which country were initially located further to the north. The territory was moved later to the south, where it remained until its division, as a result of the house of the Ezzonids dying out in the 11th century. After County of Palatine had been allotted to various ruling houses, the rule of the Wittelsbacher began in the 13th century. Through this family, the County Palatine, which was soon to be called "Kurpfalz", gained great political importance in Southern Germany. After the Bavarian Wittelsbacher lineage died out, the Electorate of Bavaria went to the Palatine lineage in 1777. As a result, the Electorate of Palatinate-Bavaria was formed until the division of the Electoral Palatinate. The part of the Palatinate which is located on the left side of the Rhine became French during the French revolutionary wars but later became part of the kingdom of Bavaria after the subversion of Napoleon Bonaparte. The core territory of the Electoral Palatinate between the Rhine and the Neckar became part of the Grand Dutchy of Baden because of the Reichsdeputationshauptschluss in 1803 and shared its history from that point onwards (see Baden in the 19th century).

== During the 20th and 21st centuries ==
Mannheim's mayor, Hermann Heimerich, attempted to overcome the division of the old Electoral Palatinate in 1948, which ultimately failed. One reason for this was that, because of their unity, the South German territorial states had an advantage over the divided character of the Electoral Palatinate. Cities like Worms, Speyer or Bruchsal could not identify themselves with the historical Electoral Palatinate.

In 2005, the Rhine-Neckar Metropolitan Region was formed through a treaty which aimed to strengthen and facilitate transnational cooperation. This brought the old Electoral Palatinate closer together again.

== Influence ==
=== Coat of arms ===
The coat of arms of the historical Electoral Palatinate can be found in a number of coats of arms, however, mostly without the white and blue diamond of the Wittelsbacher. From a heraldic perspective, the Electoral Palatinate plays a subordinate role to the Coat of arms of Baden-Württemberg.

Kurpfalz	Bammental	Mannheim	Schwetzingen	Weinheim	Baden-Württemberg

See List of coats of arms with the Palatine Lion.

=== Other influences ===
- Kurpfalzbrücke – one of the bridges of Mannheim over the Neckar, built between 1947 and 1950
- Kurpfälzisches orchestra – is considered the successor to the "Hofkapelle electorate" of the elector Karl Theodor
- Kurpfälzisches Museum – Museum with an archeological section in Heidelberg
- Kurpfalz-Park – an amusement and animal park in Wachenheim (Rheinland-Palatinate)
- Kurpfalzring – former name (from 1938 to 1965) of today's motorsport and race track Hockenheimring Baden-Württemberg
- Kurpfälzisches Winzerfest Wiesloch – annual wine festival in Wiesloch
- Kurpfalz-Centrum – Administrative and shopping center in Leimen

The local performers Bülent Ceylan and Joy Fleming are also known beyond the Kurpfalz borders.

== Literature ==
- Schweickert, Alexander: Kurpfalz, Kohlhammer Verlag 1997, ISBN 978-3170140387
- Schaab, Meinhard: Geschichte der Kurpfalz, Bd. 1 Mittelalter, Kohlhammer Verlag 1988, ISBN 978-3170098008
- Schaab, Meinhard: Geschichte der Kurpfalz, Bd. 2 Neuzeit, Kohlhammer Verlag 1992, ISBN 978-3170098770
