= List of landscapes in Rhineland-Palatinate =

Location of Rhineland-Palatinate within Germany

This is a list of landscapes in Rhineland-Palatinate covering the regions of the Eifel, Hunsrück, Moselle-Saar, Westerwald, Rhenish Hesse and the Palatinate:

1. Ahr Hills
2. Ahr Valley
3. Alzey Hills
4. Bienwald
5. Bingen Forest
6. Bitburg Land
7. Boppard Hamm
8. Breisig Ländchen
9. Buchfinkenland
10. Cochem Krampen
11. Dahner Felsenland
12. Eifel
13. Einrich
14. Gräfenstein Land
15. Haardt
16. High Eifel
17. High Westerwald
18. Holzland
19. Hunsrück
20. Idarwald
21. Islek
22. Kaiserslauten Basin
23. Kannenbäckerland
24. Kondelwald
25. Kröver Reich
26. Kroppach Switzerland
27. Kyllwald
28. Landstuhl Marsh
29. Lützelsoon
30. Maifeld
31. Mehringen Switzerland
32. Meulenwald
33. Middle Moselle
34. Middle Rhine
35. Moselle Hills
36. Moselle valley
37. Mosel-Saar-Ruwer
38. Nahe valley
39. Nahe Uplands
40. Neuwied Basin
41. Upper Mundat Forest
42. Upper Moselle
43. Osburg Hochwald
44. Pellenz
45. Palatine Uplands
46. Palatinate Forest
47. Palatine Depression
48. Palatine Rhine Plain
49. Palatinate
50. Prümer Kalkmulde
51. Rhenish Hesse
52. Rhenish-Hessian Switzerland
53. Rhenish-Hessian Hills
54. Ruwer valley
55. Saargau
56. Saar valley
57. Salmwald
58. Schneifel
59. Schönecken Switzerland
60. Schwarzwälder Hochwald
61. Sickingen Heights
62. Siegerland
63. Soonwald
64. Stumpfwald
65. South Palatinate
66. Trier valley
67. Lower Moselle
68. Viertäler
69. Anterior Palatinate
70. Vorderwesterwald
71. Vulkan Eifel
72. Wasgau
73. Weinstraße
74. Westerwald
75. Westrich
76. Westrich Plateau
77. Wildenburg Land
78. Wittlich Depression
79. Wonnegau
80. Zeller Hamm
81. Zweibrücken Hills

== See also ==
- List of regions of Saxony
- Little Switzerland (landscape)
