= Weselberg =

- Municipality
- Coat of arms

- Location of Weselberg within Südwestpfalz district
- Interactive map of Weselberg
- Location within Germany Location within Rhineland-Palatinate
- Coordinates: 49°20′7″N 7°36′27″E
- Country: Germany
- State: Rhineland-Palatinate
- District: Südwestpfalz
- Municipal assoc.: Thaleischweiler-Wallhalben

Government
  - Mayor (2019–24): Michael Schmitt (CDU)

Area
  - Total: 14.64 km^{2} (5.65 sq mi)
- Elevation: 435 m (1,427 ft)

Population (2025-12-31)
  - Total: 1,329
  - Density: 90.78/km^{2} (235.1/sq mi)
- Time zone: UTC+01:00 (CET)
  - Summer (DST): UTC+02:00 (CEST)
- Postal codes: 66919
- Dialling codes: 06333, 06375
- Vehicle registration: PS
- Website: www.wallhalben.de

Weselberg (German pronunciation: [ˈveːzl̩bɛʁk]) is a municipality in the Wallhalben municipality of the Südwestpfalz district of Rhineland-Palatinate in Germany. The sister portion of the town on the western outskirts is Zeselberg. The chief economic activity is agriculture.

The coat of arms was granted March 23, 1983. The components are made up of wheat ears (agricultural character), cannonballs (from the descendants of Franz von Sickingen, who owned the village until 1793), and the chapel (a typical part of such a town).
