= Knopp-Labach =

- Municipality
- Coat of arms

- Location of Knopp-Labach within Südwestpfalz district
- Interactive map of Knopp-Labach
- Location within Germany Location within Rhineland-Palatinate
- Coordinates: 49°19′58.12″N 7°30′22.45″E
- Country: Germany
- State: Rhineland-Palatinate
- District: Südwestpfalz
- Municipal assoc.: Thaleischweiler-Wallhalben

Government
  - Mayor (2019–24): Ralph Schneider

Area
  - Total: 5.95 km^{2} (2.30 sq mi)
- Elevation: 350 m (1,150 ft)

Population (2025-12-31)
  - Total: 420
  - Density: 71/km^{2} (180/sq mi)
- Time zone: UTC+01:00 (CET)
  - Summer (DST): UTC+02:00 (CEST)
- Postal codes: 66917
- Dialling codes: 06375
- Vehicle registration: PS

Knopp-Labach is a municipality in Südwestpfalz district, in Rhineland-Palatinate, western Germany. It is situated approximately 15 km northwest of Pirmasens, and 15 km northeast of Zweibrücken. Until 1 July 2014, when it became part of the Verbandsgemeinde ("collective municipality") Thaleischweiler-Wallhalben, Knopp-Labach had been a part of the Verbandsgemeinde Wallhalben.
