= Westrich Plateau =

Landscape in Germany

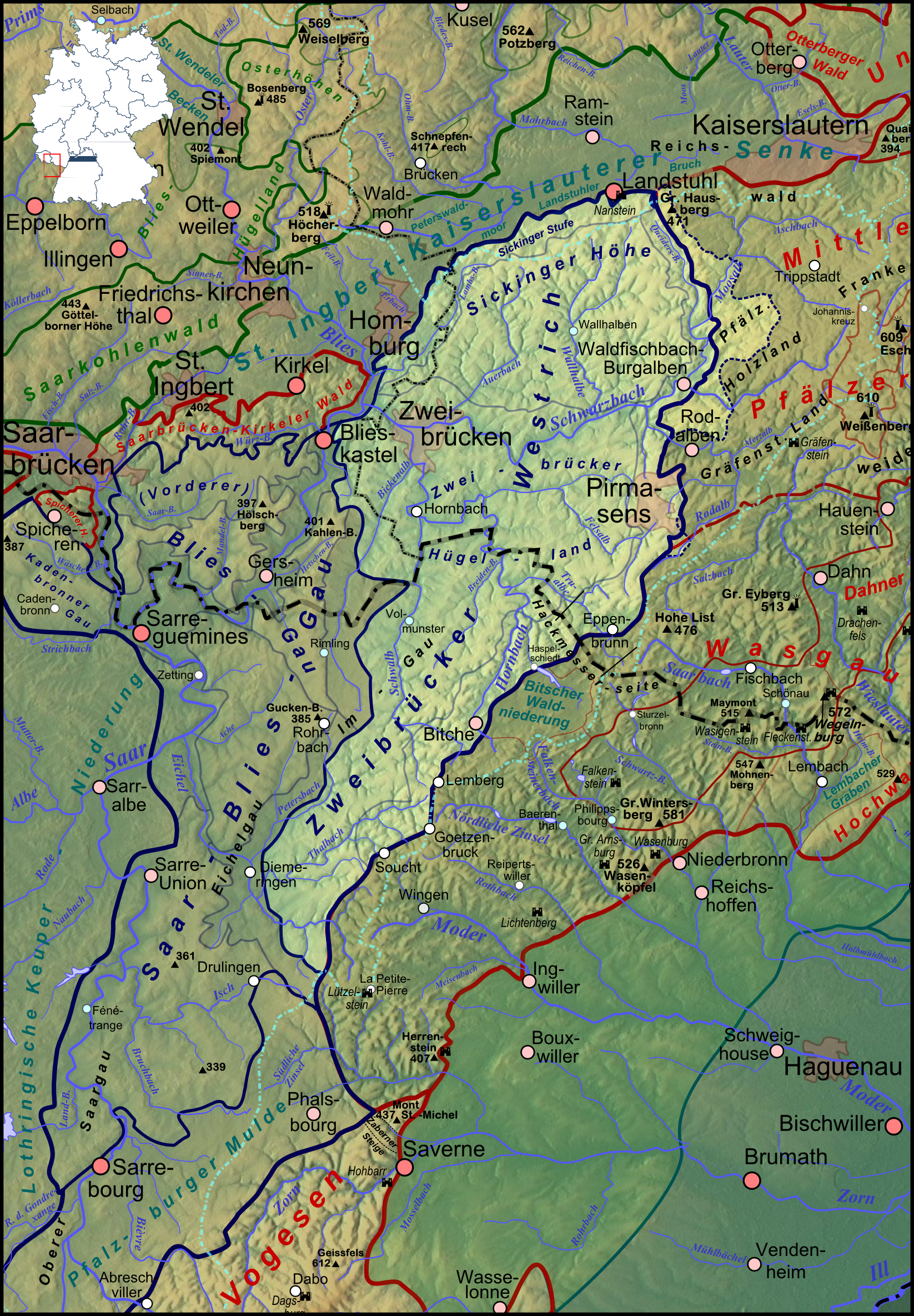
The Westrich Plateau (highlighted) to the west of the Palatinate Forest and Wasgau

The Westrich Plateau (German: Westricher Hochfläche), also Zweibrücken Westrich (Zweibrücker Westrich) or Southwest Palatine Plateau (Südwestpfälzische Hochfläche), is a landscape in the German state of Rhineland-Palatinate, with small areas also in the Saarland (Saarpfalz-Kreis). Its heart is in the southwest of the Palatinate region and it is part of the historic region of Westrich.

== Geography ==
=== Structure and boundaries ===
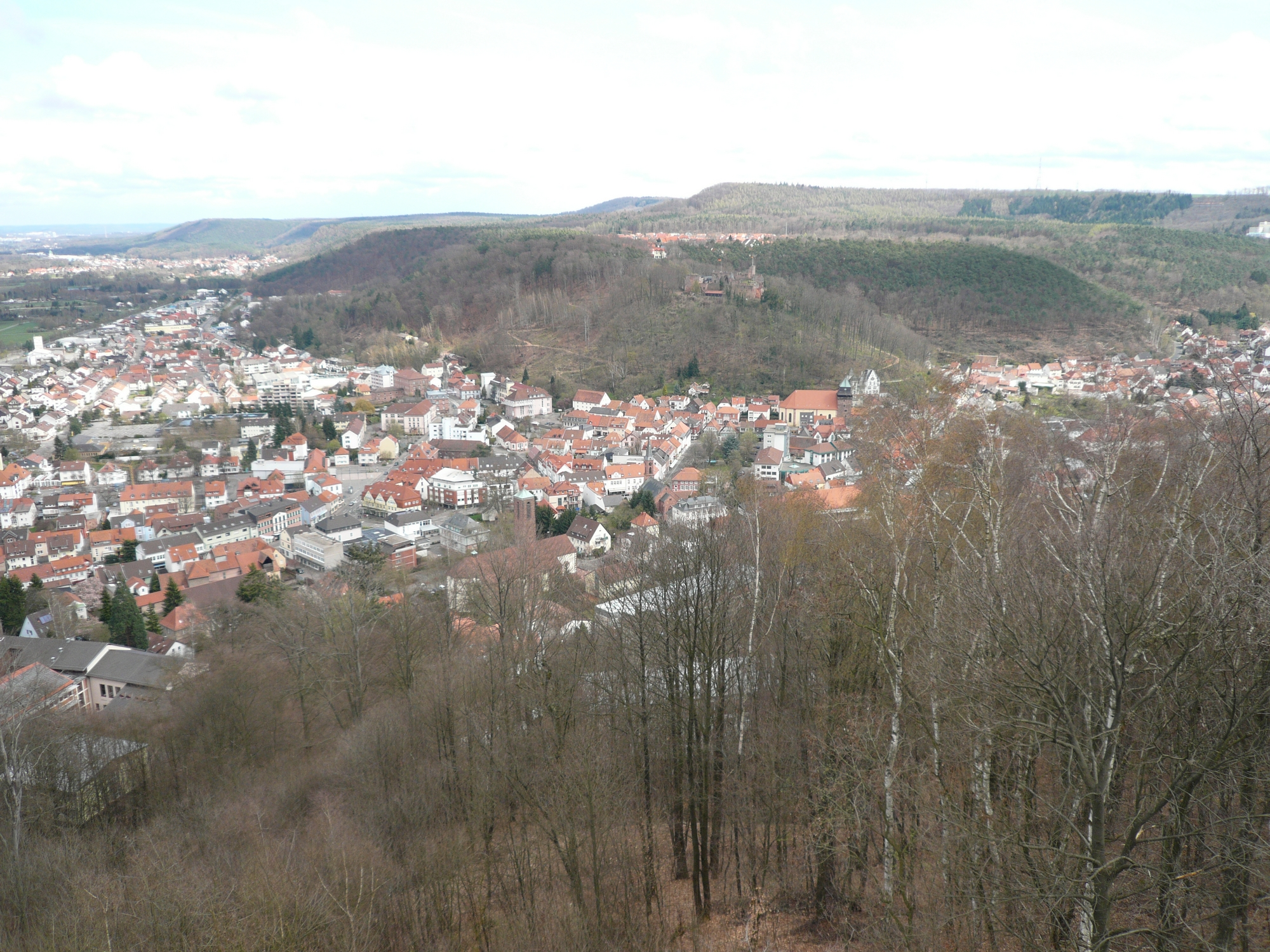
The Sickingen Escarpment rising from Landstuhl (on the left) to the Sickingen Heights (on the right)

The Westrich Plateau consists mainly of the Sickingen Heights in the north and the Zweibrücken Hills in the south which, morphologically, belong more to northeastern Lorraine in France).

The main plateau falls away in a marked scarp slope, the Sickingen Escarpment, to the northwest (towards the Homburg Basin) and especially to the north, towards the Landstuhl Marsh. By contrast, the eastern edge of the Westrich transitions rather smoothly from its muschelkalk plateau to the bunter sandstone of the Palatine Forest. The subdivisions of the plateau along the Moosalb and near Eppenbrunn also extend into the wooded region of the Palatine Forest Nature Park. In the east the land gradually descends to the settlement fringe of Pirmasens and the Trualbe, opposite the Queidersbach and the Moosalb valley, which forms the actual eastern boundary. To the south the Zweibrücken Hills continue the plateau into France, and more specifically into the Bitscherland and the Alsace bossue.

The central section of the plateau's western boundary with the Saint Ingbert-Kirkeler Woods and, further south, with the Bliesgau, runs (according to the Bundesanstalt für Landeskunde, Saarbrücken sheet, and popular opinion) just west of the state border with Saarland and does not cross the valley of the Blies, which from here on forms the boundary with the first-named of the two regions. This compares with a purely Saarland division according to Quasten which also counts a narrow strip of land southwest of Blieskastel (right = west of the Blies) as part of the Zweibrücken Westrich.

== Literature ==
- August Becker (2005) [1857], Die Pfalz und die Pfälzer (in German) (7. ed.), Landau/Pfalz (1st edn., 1857): Pfälzische Verlagsanstalt, pp. 338–363, ISBN 3898571939
- Michael Geiger (2010), "Die Landschaften der Pfalz", in Michael Geiger (ed.), Geographie der Pfalz (in German), Landau/Pfalz: Verlag Pfälzische Landeskunde, pp. 92–113, ISBN 9783981297409
- Daniel Häberle (1913), Der Pfälzerwald : Ein Beitrag zur Landeskunde der Rheinpfalz (in German), Braunschweig und Berlin: Georg Westermann Verlag
- Karl Heinz (1976), Pfalz mit Weinstraße : Landschaft, Geschichte, Kultur, Kunst, Volkstum (in German), Heroldsberg: Glock und Lutz Verlag, pp. 239–268, ISBN 978-3850007412
- Emil Heuser (1979) [1900 ASIN B0043G3V6M], Neuer Pfalzführer (in German) (14th ed.), Ludwigshafen/Rhein (1st edn., 1900), ASIN B0043G3V6M: Waldkirch Verlag
- Heinz Wittner (1981), Großer Pfalzführer (in German), Stuttgart: Deutscher Wanderverlag Dr. Mair & Schnabel & Co., pp. 479–510, ISBN 3813401065
