= Palatine Lion =

Heraldic charge

Palatine Lion

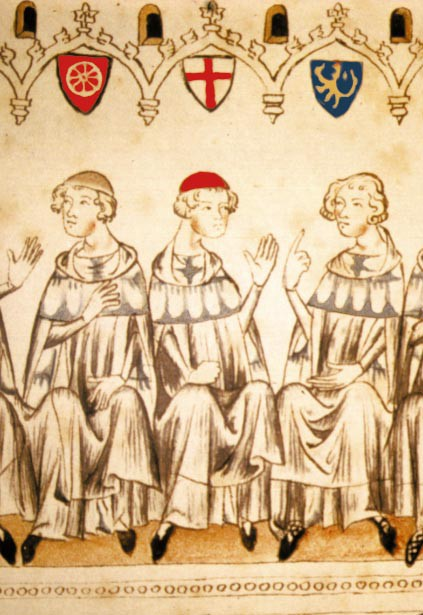
Three electors sitting below their coats of arms (1341), from the left: Peter of Mainz, Balduin of Trier and Rudolph

The Palatine Lion (German: Pfälzer Löwe), less commonly the Palatinate Lion, is an heraldic charge (see also: heraldic lions). It was originally part of the family coat of arms of the House of Wittelsbach and is found today on many coats of arms of municipalities, counties and regions in South Germany and the Austrian Innviertel.

== Forms ==
The main design is described as sable a lion rampant or, crowned, armed and langued gules. Originally uncrowned, the lion was first depicted with a red crown in the early 14th century in the Zürich armorial. This probably relates to the pre-eminent position held by the Prince-Elector of the Palatinate as an imperial vicar, since the Golden Bull of 1356.

In addition to these two main forms, there are a number of variants. Many villages used the symbols of their ruling families as seals. In order to minimise the risk of confusion, the detail of the coat of arms was changed when authority was granted to use them. Occasionally other colours were used in order to stay faithful to the rule of tincture.

The Palatine Lion of Neustadt an der Weinstraße as an example

Meckenheim uses the Electoral Palatine coat of arms with the addition of the letter "M".

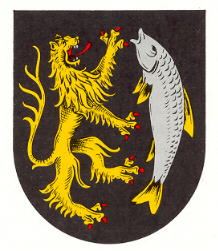
Waldfischbach

Heltersberg, like Waldfischbach with the position of the paws altered

Rhein-Neckar-Kreis, altered tincture

City of Heidelberg

Landkreis Neumarkt in der Oberpfalz

Selzen

Lonsheim

Albig

Worms-Ibersheim

Bammental, coat of arms with the lion and the diamonds of Electoral Palatinate

== History ==
=== Emergence ===
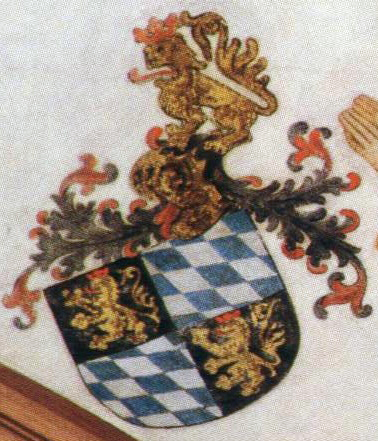
Coat of arms of Electoral Palatinate, with helmet and Palatine lions as crest; Collegiate Church of Neustadt an der Weinstraße, around 1420

The Palatine Lion first appears in the County Palatine of the Rhine under the Wittelsbach Count Palatine, Otto the Illustrious in his equestrian seal (Reitersiegel) of 1229. However, the use of the symbol is probably older; it may well go back to predecessors of the Wittelsbachs, the Welf counts palatine, who ruled from 1195 to 1214: Counts Palatine Henry the Elder and Henry the Younger. Prior to that the Hohenstaufen Count Palatine Conrad, father-in-law of Henry the Elder, had around 1,190 coins minted with a lion image. The colours of the Hohenstaufens were also gold and black.

=== Wittelsbach era ===
Following the enfeoffment of the Bavarian Duke Louis in 1214 with the County Palatine of the Rhine, Duke Otto II of Bavaria inherited the County of Bogen in the mid-13th century along with its blue and white lozenged coat of arms. For centuries the golden lion on a black field and the blue and white lozenges were used as the family coat of arms of the Old Bavarian and Palatine Wittelsbachs. Not until the 16th century did the distinction between the lion for the Palatinate and the lozenges for Bavaria slowly gain ground.

In Siebmacher's Armorial of 1605 there are four coloured illustrations that use the Palatine Lion. They represent the coats of arms of the Electorate of the Palatinate and the duchies of Bavaria, Palatinate-Neuburg and Palatinate-Lützelstein.

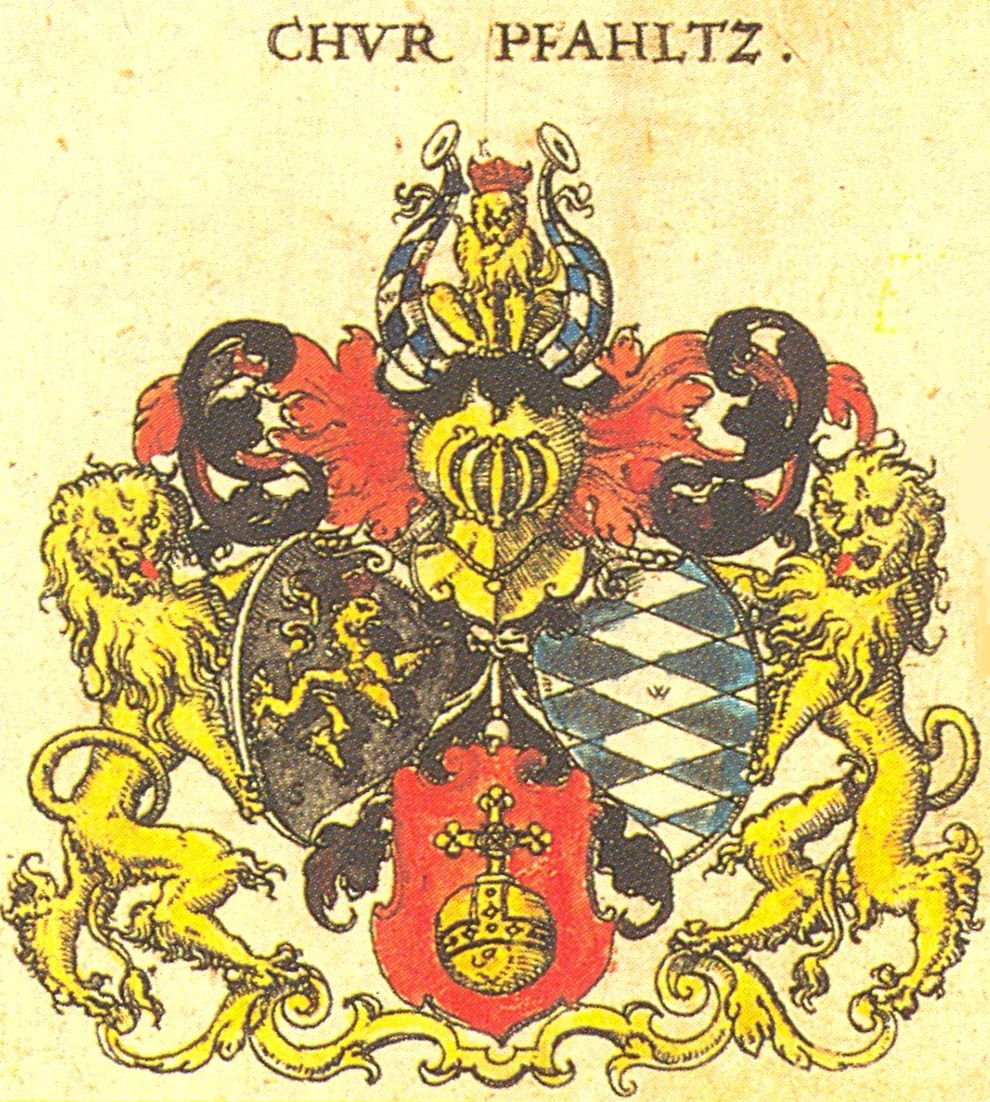
Electoral Palatinate

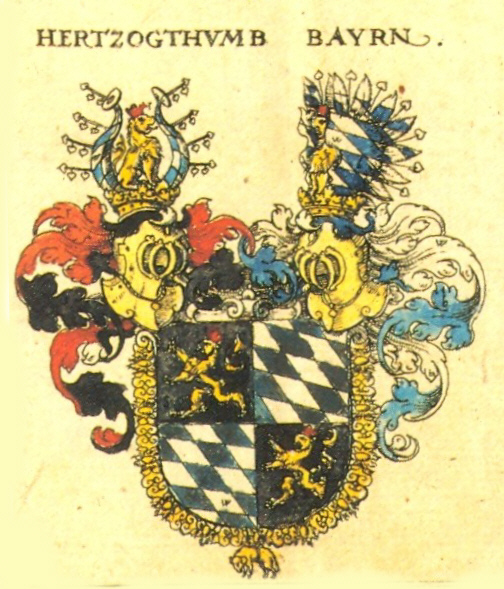
Bavaria

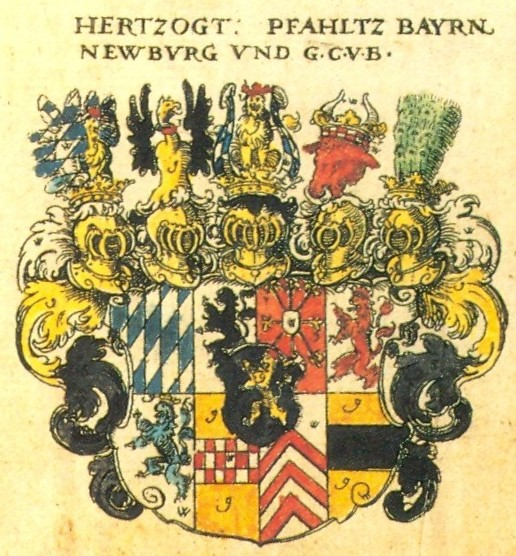
Palatinate-Neuburg

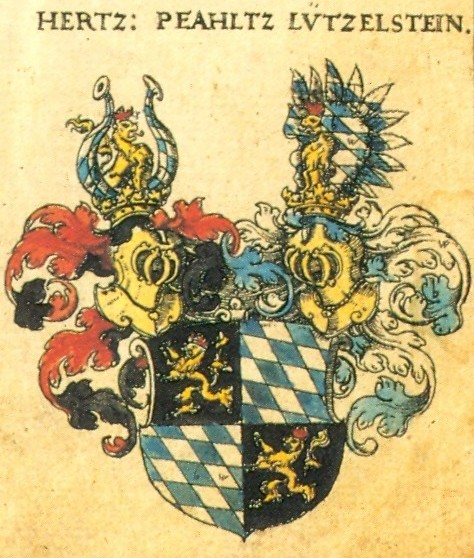
Palatinate-Lützelstein

Following the dissolution of the Palatine electorate in the wake of the Reichsdeputationshauptschluss of 1803, from 1816 the Palatine Lion in the Bavarian coat of arms was only used by the west Rhine part of the Kingdom of Bavaria, the Rhine Circle, which was renamed in 1835 at the behest of Louis I to Rhenish Palatinate (Rheinpfalz).

=== Post-war period ===
State coat of arms of Rhineland-Palatinate

After the Second World War the Palatinate Lion re-emerged as the regional symbol of the Palatinate, for example, on postage stamps in the French Zone of Occupation. Following the creation of the state of Rhineland-Palatinate in 1946, to which the Palatinate belonged, the Palatine Lion occupied a central place in the state coat of arms of Rhineland-Palatinate. The other elements of the Rhineland-Palatine coat of arms are the Wheel of Mainz (Mainzer Rad) and the Cross of Trier (Trierer Kreuz). Even the semi-official coat of arms of the province of Palatinate, which existed from 1946 to 1968 and dated to the 19th century, bore the Palatine Lion, which after the inclusion of the former territories of Electoral Mainz and Electoral Trier, symbolised the region of the present-day Palatinate.

In addition, the lion may be found in the state coats of arms of three other German federated state: the Bavarian coat of arms (uncrowned), the Saarland coat of arms and the Baden-Württemberg coat of arms; all three states used to incorporate an Electoral Palatine territory. Since 1950, the lion in the Bavarian state coat of arms, has been emblazoned in the dexter chief today for the Upper Palatinate, which once belonged to the House of Wittelsbach. From 1923 to 1934 the Palatine Lion was in the second subfield on the Bavarian shield; since 1950 it has been placed in the first subfield, as in the state coat of arms.

== Representations of the Palatine Lion ==
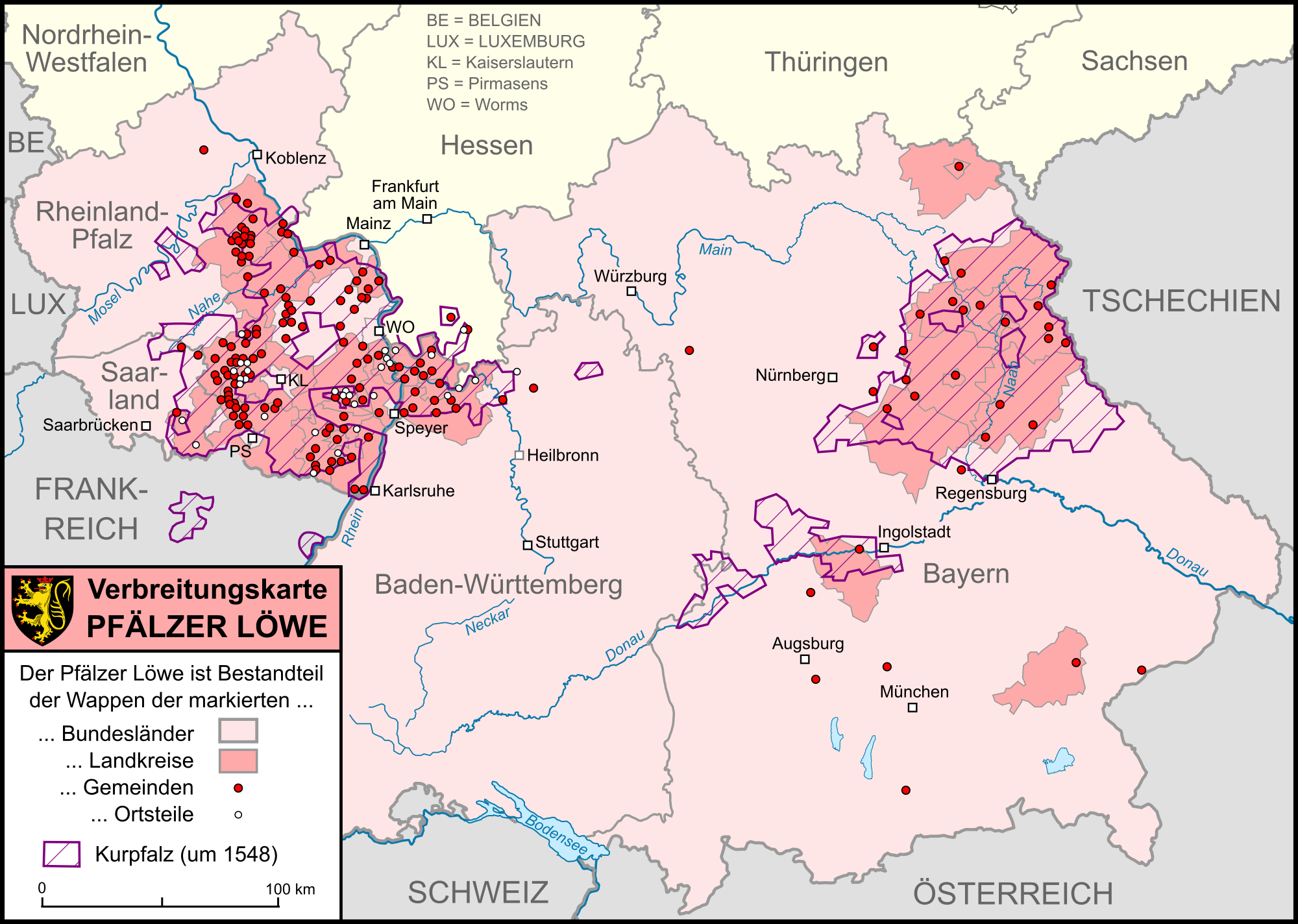
Distribution of the Palatine Lion

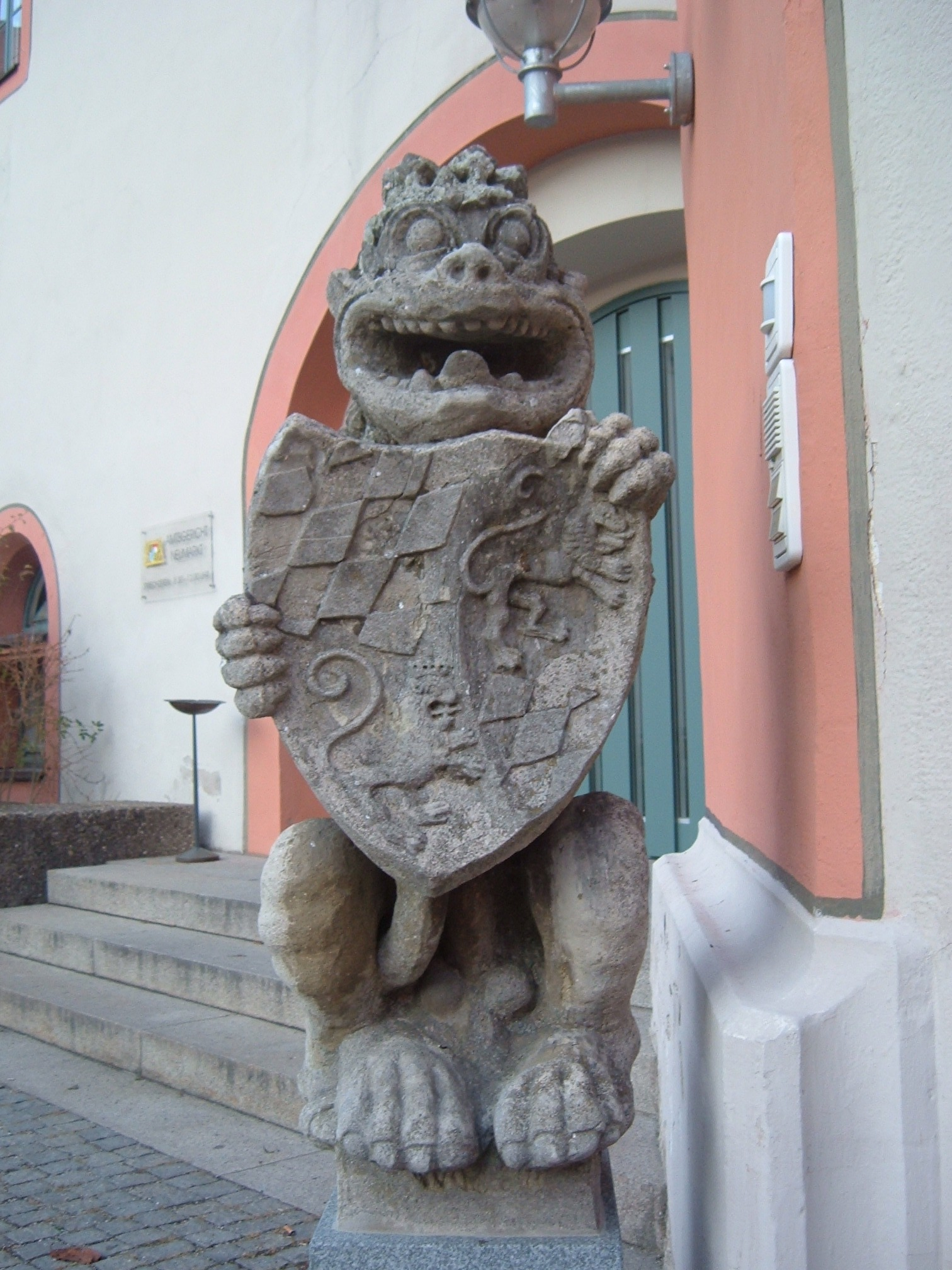
Palatine Lion with the coat of arms of Frederick II in front of the County Palatine Palace (Pfalzgrafenschloss) in Neumarkt

=== Coats of arms ===
See: List of coats of arms with the Palatine Lion

=== Flags ===
The flag of the Elector of Bavaria, used from 1623 to 1806, is quartered with the Palatine Lion in the second and third quarters; the first and fourth quarters display the blue and white fusils.

=== Seal ===
In his book, Die Siegel der Deutschen Kaiser und Könige, Otto Posse describes seals of the Electoral Palatine Imperial Vicariate:

- 1558: The count palatine in full armour on horseback with appropriate equipment (weapon, standard), in the background a princely palace, on the horse's blanket, 3 escutcheons. The rightmost depicts the Palatine Lion, the centre one the Imperial Orb for the archseneschal, the leftmost shield displays the Bavarian Wecken.
- 1612: On three escutcheons are: on the right hand one the Palatine Lion, in the centre the Imperial Orb and on the left hand one the Bavarian Wecken. On a helmet above is a crowned lion, on either side, the numbers 16 and 12 indicating the year.

=== Stonework ===
- The archway of the Hospital of the Holy Spirit in Bad Mergentheim bears the coat of arms of Prince-Bishop Francis Louis of Palatinate-Neuburg with a Palatine Lion as well as a blue lion, with gold claws and also crowned, in silver, which represents the County of Veldenz.
- The Schriesheim coat of arms, granted to the village in 1896 based on a seal from 1381, is supported by the Palatine Lion. The detail was created out of Red Main sandstone in 1964 for an octagonal trough at the municipal fountain by a firm of stonemasons from the town on the occasion of the naming of the town.
- In front of the gate of the residenz in Neumarkt stand two stone lions that hold the coat of arms of Elector Frederick II in their paws. This coat of arms also depicts the lion.

=== Paintings ===
The basilica of St. Wendelin in the Saarland county town of St. Wendel has a ceiling mural dating to 1463/64, which depicts coats of arms. Amongst the 15 shields displayed, those of the Archbishop of Cologne and the Count Palatine of the Rhine depict the Palatine Lion.

== See also ==
- Order of the Palatine Lion
- Veldenz lion

== Literature ==
- Karl Heinz Debus: Das große Wappenbuch der Pfalz. Neustadt an der Weinstraße, 1988, ISBN 3-9801574-2-3
- Alfons Friderichs: Wappenbuch des Kreises Cochem-Zell, Darmstadt, 2001, ISBN 3-00-008064-3
- Herwig John, Gabriele Wüst: Wappenbuch Rhein-Neckar-Kreis. Ubstadt-Weiher, 1996, ISBN 3-929366-27-4
- Arnold Rabbow, Dieter Gube: Blätter zum Land 1′99: Landeswappen Rheinland-Pfalz (PDF; 562 kB). Mainz, 1999
