= Thaleischweiler-Wallhalben =

- Verbandsgemeinde
- Location of Thaleischweiler-Wallhalben within Südwestpfalz district
- Interactive map of Thaleischweiler-Wallhalben
- Location within Germany Location within Rhineland-Palatinate
- Coordinates: 49°16′N 7°34′E
- Country: Germany
- State: Rhineland-Palatinate
- District: Südwestpfalz
- Seat: Thaleischweiler-Fröschen
- Subdivisions: 20 municipalities

Area
  - Total: 142.61 km^{2} (55.06 sq mi)

Population (2025-12-31)
  - Total: 16,379
  - Density: 114.85/km^{2} (297.46/sq mi)
- Time zone: UTC+01:00 (CET)
  - Summer (DST): UTC+02:00 (CEST)
- Website: www.vgtw.de

Thaleischweiler-Wallhalben is a Verbandsgemeinde ("collective municipality") in the Südwestpfalz district, in Rhineland-Palatinate, Germany. The seat of the municipality is in Thaleischweiler-Fröschen. It was formed on 1 July 2014 by the merger of the former Verbandsgemeinden Thaleischweiler-Fröschen and Wallhalben. Before 1 January 2016, the Verbandsgemeinde was named Thaleischweiler-Fröschen - Wallhalben.

The Verbandsgemeinde Thaleischweiler-Wallhalben consists of the following Ortsgemeinden ("local municipalities"):

1. Biedershausen
2. Herschberg
3. Hettenhausen
4. Höheischweiler
5. Höhfröschen
6. Knopp-Labach
7. Krähenberg
8. Maßweiler
9. Nünschweiler
10. Obernheim-Kirchenarnbach
11. Petersberg
12. Reifenberg
13. Rieschweiler-Mühlbach
14. Saalstadt
15. Schauerberg
16. Schmitshausen
17. Thaleischweiler-Fröschen
18. Wallhalben
19. Weselberg
20. Winterbach
