= Saalstadt =

- Municipality
- Coat of arms

- Location of Saalstadt within Südwestpfalz district
- Interactive map of Saalstadt
- Location within Germany Location within Rhineland-Palatinate
- Coordinates: 49°19′24″N 7°32′59″E
- Country: Germany
- State: Rhineland-Palatinate
- District: Südwestpfalz
- Municipal assoc.: Thaleischweiler-Wallhalben

Government
  - Mayor (2019–24): Gerd Kiefer

Area
  - Total: 5.29 km^{2} (2.04 sq mi)
- Elevation: 317 m (1,040 ft)

Population (2025-12-31)
  - Total: 308
  - Density: 58.2/km^{2} (151/sq mi)
- Time zone: UTC+01:00 (CET)
  - Summer (DST): UTC+02:00 (CEST)
- Postal codes: 66919
- Dialling codes: 06375
- Vehicle registration: PS
- Website: www.saalstadt.de

Saalstadt (German pronunciation: [ˈzaːlʃtat]) is a municipality in Südwestpfalz district, in Rhineland-Palatinate, western Germany.
