= Thaleischweiler-Fröschen =

- Municipality
- Coat of arms

- Location of Thaleischweiler-Fröschen within Südwestpfalz district
- Interactive map of Thaleischweiler-Fröschen
- Location within Germany Location within Rhineland-Palatinate
- Coordinates: 49°15′48″N 7°34′59″E
- Country: Germany
- State: Rhineland-Palatinate
- District: Südwestpfalz
- Municipal assoc.: Thaleischweiler-Wallhalben

Government
  - Mayor (2019–24): Thomas Peifer (CDU)

Area
  - Total: 12.27 km^{2} (4.74 sq mi)
- Elevation: 299 m (981 ft)

Population (2025-12-31)
  - Total: 2,696
  - Density: 219.7/km^{2} (569.1/sq mi)
- Time zone: UTC+01:00 (CET)
  - Summer (DST): UTC+02:00 (CEST)
- Postal codes: 66987
- Dialling codes: 06334
- Vehicle registration: PS
- Website: www.vg-thaleischweiler-froeschen.de

Thaleischweiler-Fröschen is a municipality in the Südwestpfalz district, in Rhineland-Palatinate, Germany. It is situated on the western edge of the Palatinate Forest, approximately 7 kilometres (4.3 mi) north of Pirmasens.

Thaleischweiler-Fröschen is the seat of the Verbandsgemeinde ("collective municipality") Thaleischweiler-Wallhalben.

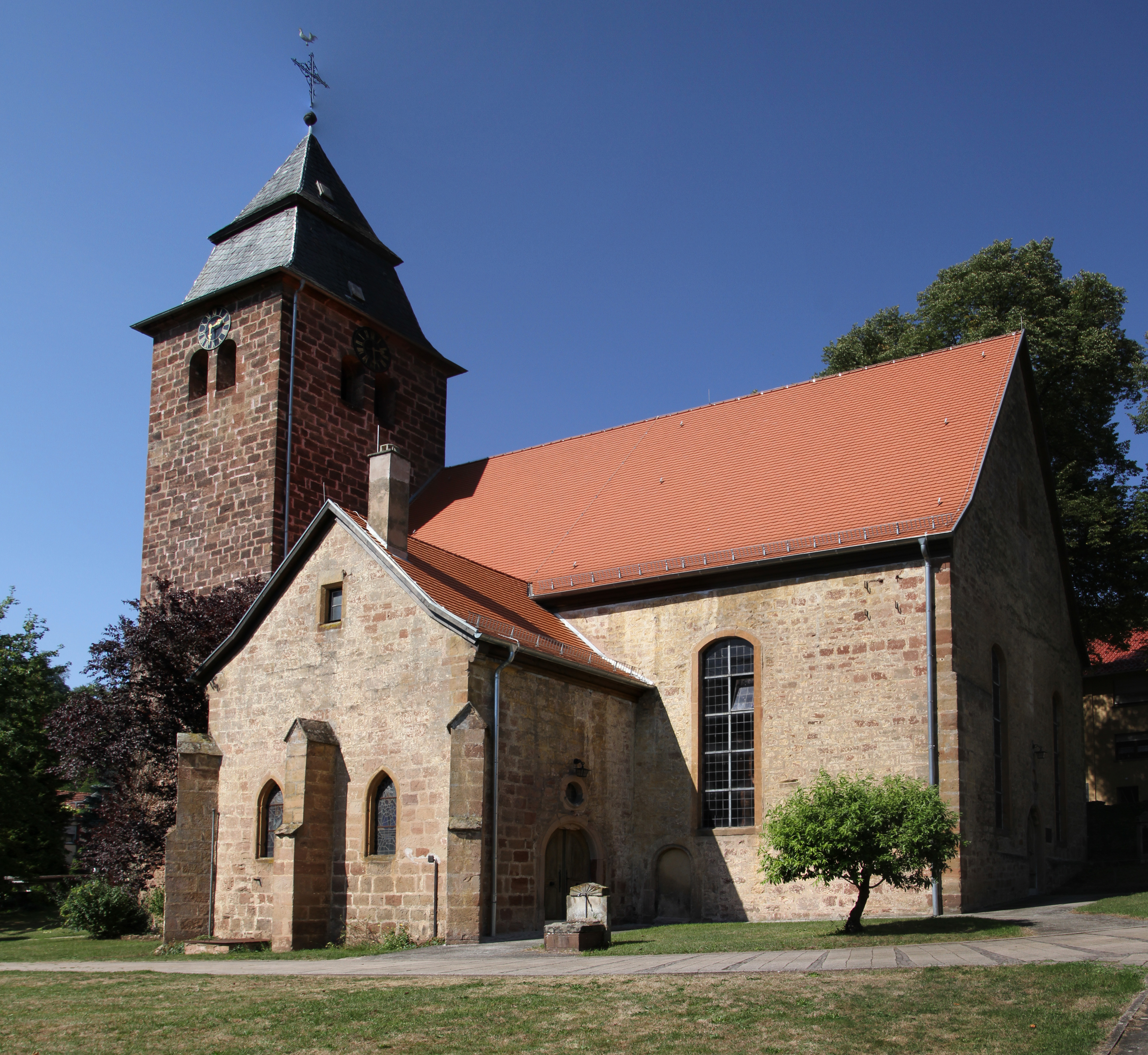
Protestant church
