= Schmitshausen =

- Municipality
- Coat of arms

- Location of Schmitshausen within Südwestpfalz district
- Interactive map of Schmitshausen
- Location within Germany Location within Rhineland-Palatinate
- Coordinates: 49°18′25″N 7°30′43″E
- Country: Germany
- State: Rhineland-Palatinate
- District: Südwestpfalz
- Municipal assoc.: Thaleischweiler-Wallhalben

Government
  - Mayor (2019–24): Markus Schieler

Area
  - Total: 4.49 km^{2} (1.73 sq mi)
- Elevation: 300 m (980 ft)

Population (2025-12-31)
  - Total: 389
  - Density: 86.6/km^{2} (224/sq mi)
- Time zone: UTC+01:00 (CET)
  - Summer (DST): UTC+02:00 (CEST)
- Postal codes: 66484
- Dialling codes: 06375
- Vehicle registration: PS

Schmitshausen is a municipality in Südwestpfalz district, in Rhineland-Palatinate, western Germany.

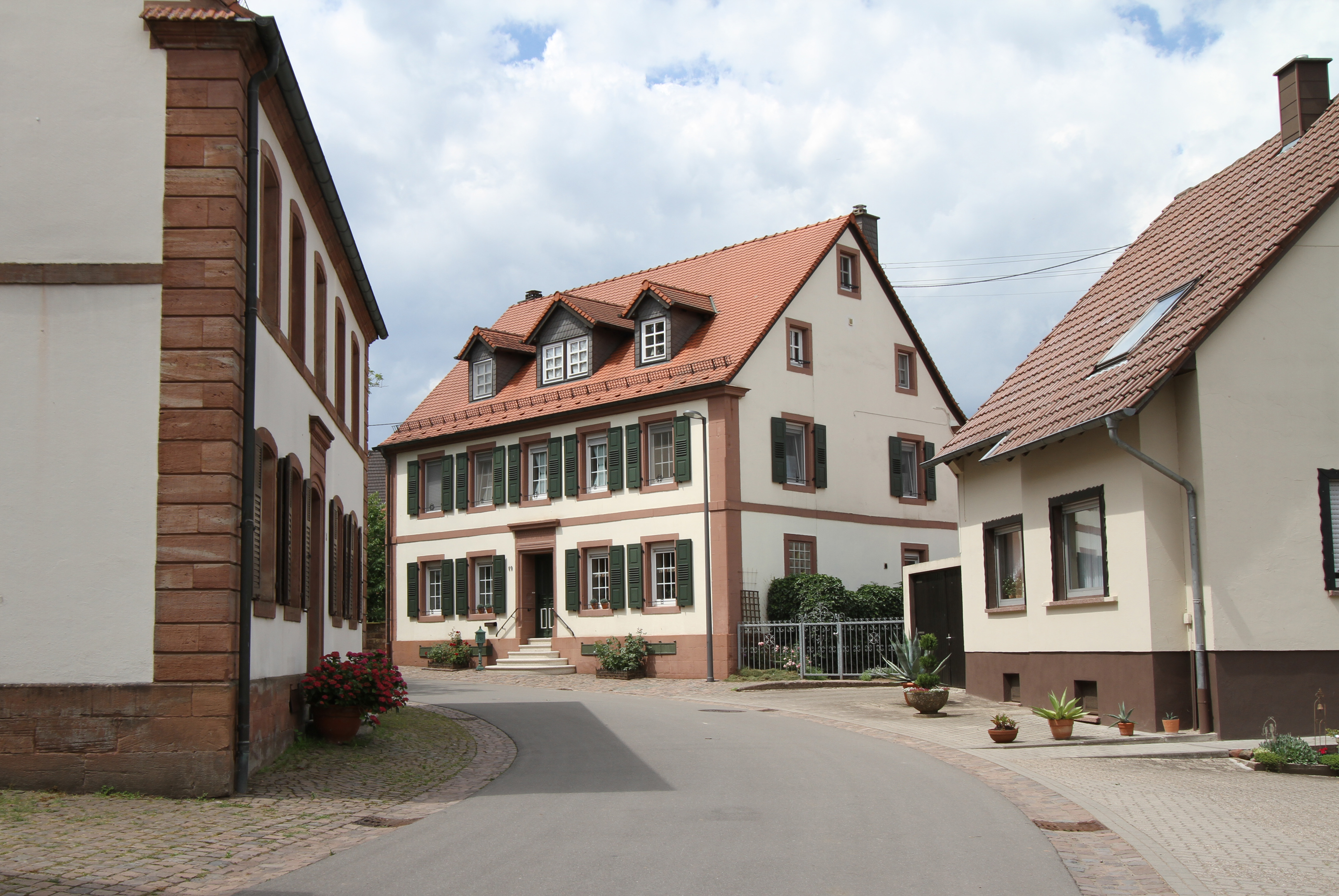
Sonnenberg street
