= Obernheim-Kirchenarnbach =

- Municipality
- Coat of arms

- Location of Obernheim-Kirchenarnbach within Südwestpfalz district
- Interactive map of Obernheim-Kirchenarnbach
- Location within Germany Location within Rhineland-Palatinate
- Coordinates: 49°21′49″N 7°34′42″E
- Country: Germany
- State: Rhineland-Palatinate
- District: Südwestpfalz
- Municipal assoc.: Thaleischweiler-Wallhalben

Government
  - Mayor (2019–24): Andreas Traub

Area
  - Total: 8.62 km^{2} (3.33 sq mi)
- Elevation: 394 m (1,293 ft)

Population (2025-12-31)
  - Total: 1,499
  - Density: 174/km^{2} (450/sq mi)
- Time zone: UTC+01:00 (CET)
  - Summer (DST): UTC+02:00 (CEST)
- Postal codes: 66919
- Dialling codes: 06371, 06375
- Vehicle registration: PS
- Website: www.wallhalben.de

Obernheim-Kirchenarnbach is a municipality in Südwestpfalz district, in Rhineland-Palatinate, western Germany.
