= Ransweiler =

- Municipality
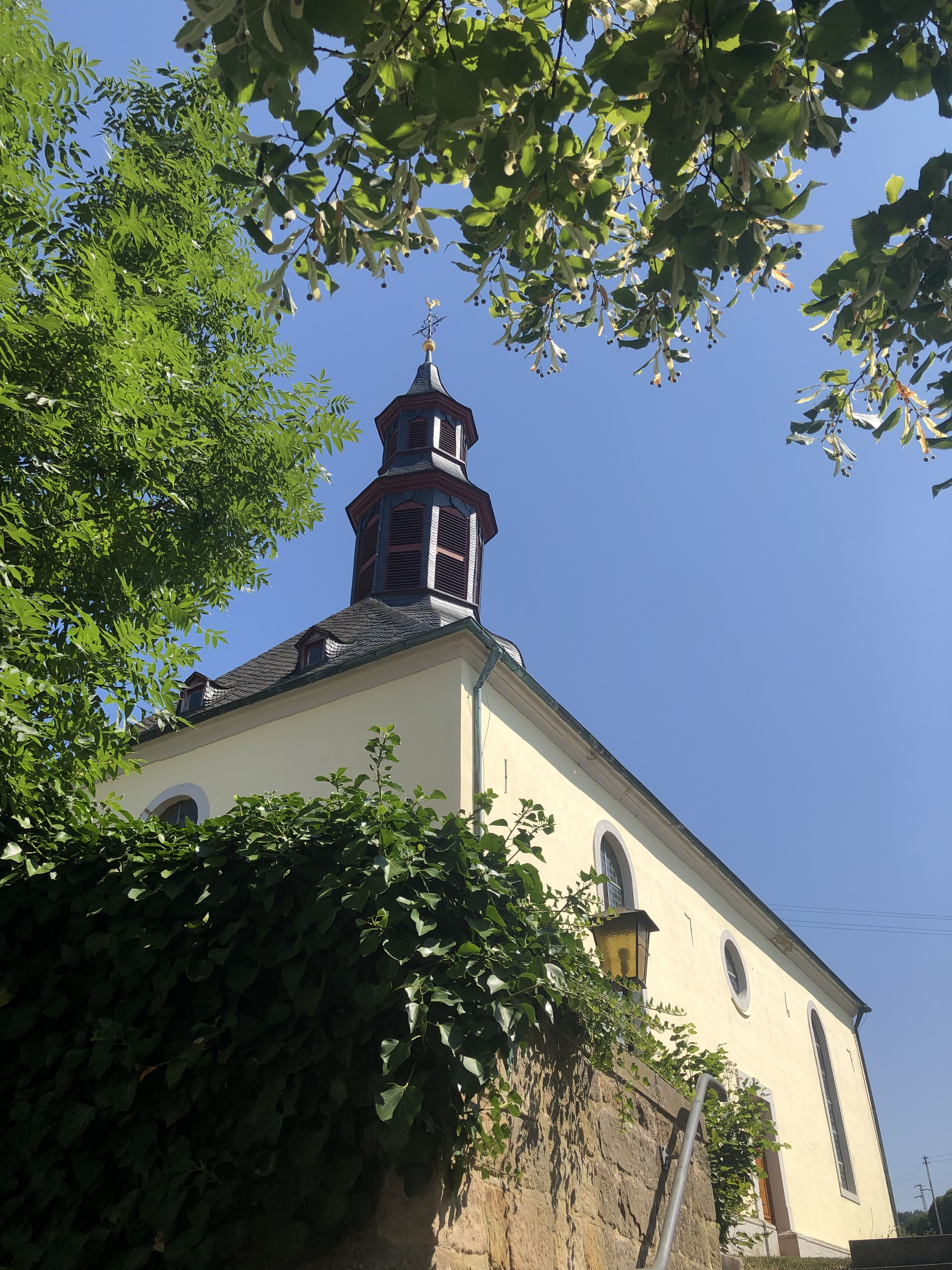
- protestant church (built in 1767)

- Coat of arms

- Location of Ransweiler within Donnersbergkreis district
- Interactive map of Ransweiler
- Location within Germany Location within Rhineland-Palatinate
- Coordinates: 49°39′54″N 7°46′9″E
- Country: Germany
- State: Rhineland-Palatinate
- District: Donnersbergkreis
- Municipal assoc.: Nordpfälzer Land

Government
  - Mayor (2019–24): Hans-Jürgen Wieland

Area
  - Total: 4.79 km^{2} (1.85 sq mi)
- Elevation: 280 m (920 ft)

Population (2025-12-31)
  - Total: 239
  - Density: 49.9/km^{2} (129/sq mi)
- Time zone: UTC+01:00 (CET)
  - Summer (DST): UTC+02:00 (CEST)
- Postal codes: 67808
- Dialling codes: 06361
- Vehicle registration: KIB
- Website: ortsgemeinde-ransweiler.de

Ransweiler (German pronunciation: [ˈʁansvaɪlɐ]) is a municipality in the Donnersbergkreis district, in Rhineland-Palatinate, Germany.
