= Höhfröschen =

- Municipality
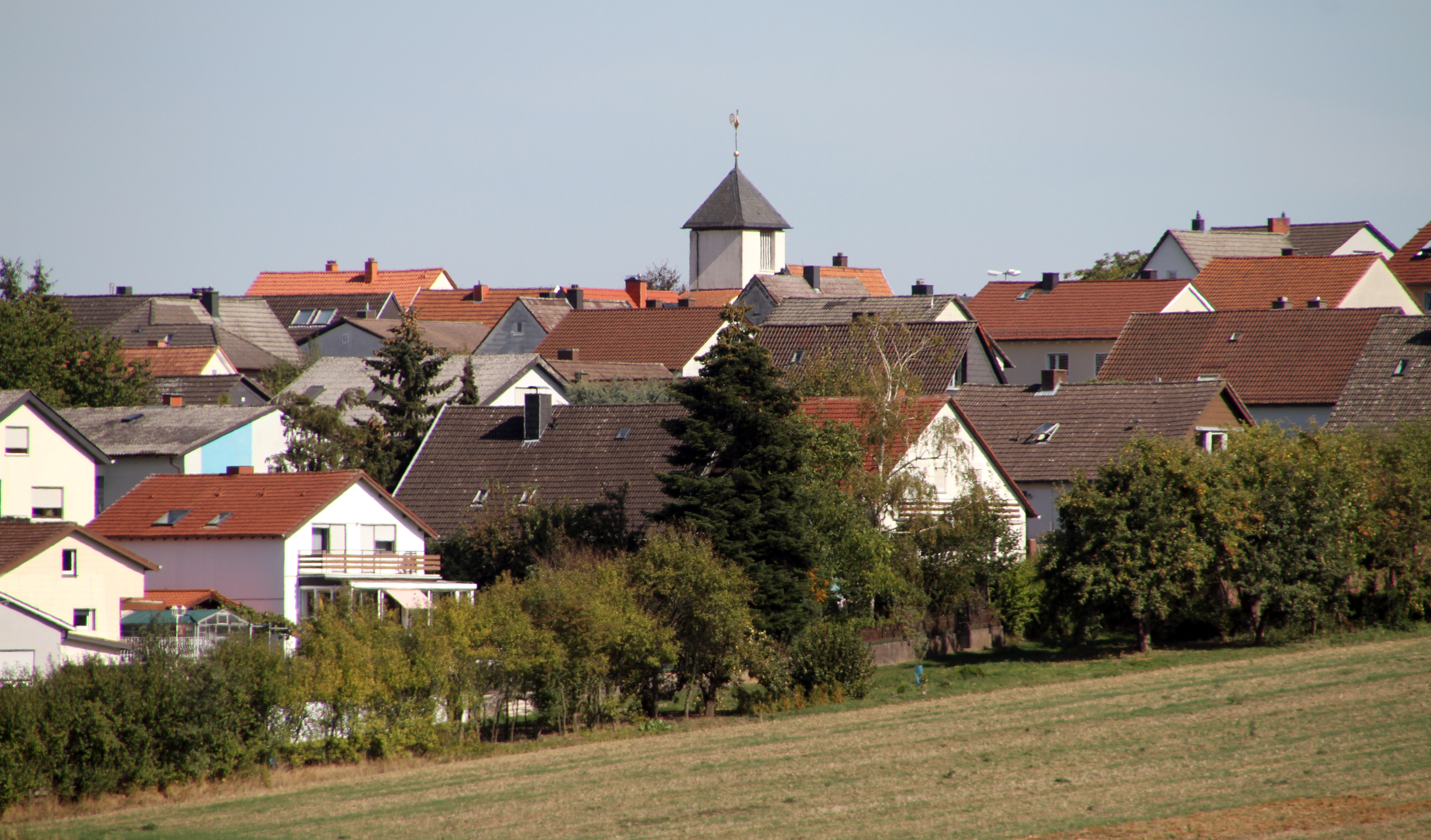

- Coat of arms

- Location of Höhfröschen within Südwestpfalz district
- Interactive map of Höhfröschen
- Location within Germany Location within Rhineland-Palatinate
- Coordinates: 49°14′48″N 7°33′46″E
- Country: Germany
- State: Rhineland-Palatinate
- District: Südwestpfalz
- Municipal assoc.: Thaleischweiler-Wallhalben

Government
  - Mayor (2019–24): Gerhard Hoffmann

Area
  - Total: 4.17 km^{2} (1.61 sq mi)
- Elevation: 344 m (1,129 ft)

Population (2025-12-31)
  - Total: 879
  - Density: 211/km^{2} (546/sq mi)
- Time zone: UTC+01:00 (CET)
  - Summer (DST): UTC+02:00 (CEST)
- Postal codes: 66989
- Dialling codes: 06334
- Vehicle registration: PS

Höhfröschen is a municipality in Südwestpfalz district, in Rhineland-Palatinate, western Germany.
