= Nünschweiler =

- Municipality
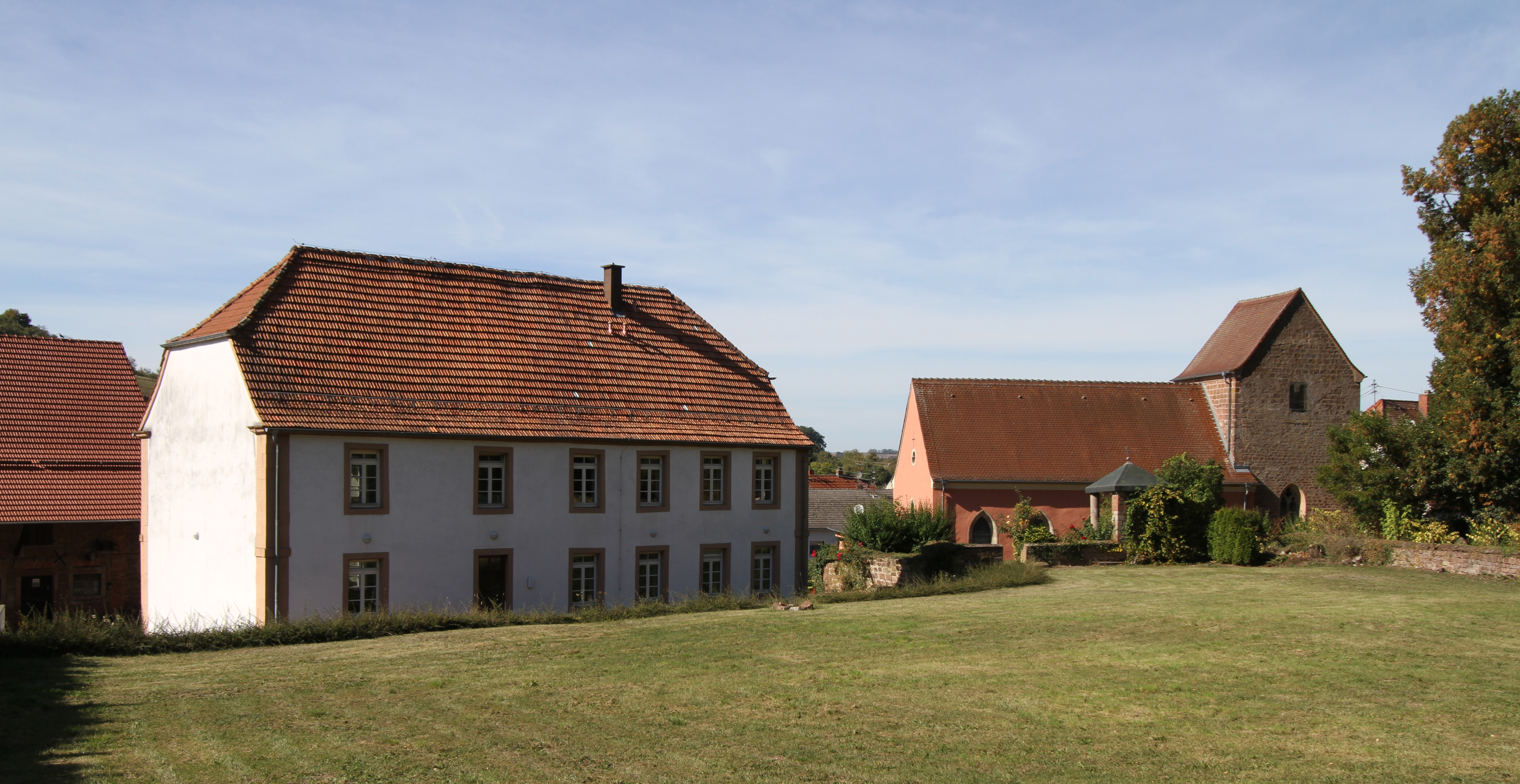

- Coat of arms

- Location of Nünschweiler within Südwestpfalz district
- Interactive map of Nünschweiler
- Location within Germany Location within Rhineland-Palatinate
- Coordinates: 49°13′23″N 7°30′16″E
- Country: Germany
- State: Rhineland-Palatinate
- District: Südwestpfalz
- Municipal assoc.: Thaleischweiler-Wallhalben

Government
  - Mayor (2019–24): Jürgen Beil (CDU)

Area
  - Total: 9.97 km^{2} (3.85 sq mi)
- Elevation: 320 m (1,050 ft)

Population (2025-12-31)
  - Total: 760
  - Density: 76/km^{2} (200/sq mi)
- Time zone: UTC+01:00 (CET)
  - Summer (DST): UTC+02:00 (CEST)
- Postal codes: 66989
- Dialling codes: 06336
- Vehicle registration: PS
- Website: Nünschweiler

Nünschweiler (German pronunciation: [ˈnʏnʃvaɪlɐ]) is a municipality in Südwestpfalz district, in Rhineland-Palatinate, western Germany.

Area: Approximately 9.97 km².

Elevation: Around 320 meters above sea level.

Population: Approximately 770 people.

Population density: About 77 people per km².

Gender distribution: ~48.7% male, 51.3% female.

Foreign nationals: Around 5.4% of residents.

Average age: 43.9 years.
