= Petersberg, Rhineland-Palatinate =

Petersberg
- Municipality
- Coat of arms

- Location of Petersberg within Südwestpfalz district
- Interactive map of Petersberg
- Location within Germany Location within Rhineland-Palatinate
- Coordinates: 49°14′20″N 7°33′57″E
- Country: Germany
- State: Rhineland-Palatinate
- District: Südwestpfalz
- Municipal assoc.: Thaleischweiler-Wallhalben

Government
  - Mayor (2019–24): Alexander Raquet

Area
  - Total: 3.84 km^{2} (1.48 sq mi)
- Elevation: 340 m (1,120 ft)

Population (2025-12-31)
  - Total: 836
  - Density: 218/km^{2} (564/sq mi)
- Time zone: UTC+01:00 (CET)
  - Summer (DST): UTC+02:00 (CEST)
- Postal codes: 66989
- Dialling codes: 06334
- Vehicle registration: PS
- Website: www.vg-thaleischweiler-froeschen.de

Petersberg (German pronunciation: [ˈpeːtɐsbɛʁk]) is a municipality in Südwestpfalz district, in Rhineland-Palatinate, western Germany.
