= Hettenhausen =

- Municipality
- Coat of arms

- Location of Hettenhausen within Südwestpfalz district
- Interactive map of Hettenhausen
- Location within Germany Location within Rhineland-Palatinate
- Coordinates: 49°20′9″N 7°33′20″E
- Country: Germany
- State: Rhineland-Palatinate
- District: Südwestpfalz
- Municipal assoc.: Thaleischweiler-Wallhalben

Government
  - Mayor (2019–24): Tobias Woll

Area
  - Total: 4.39 km^{2} (1.69 sq mi)
- Elevation: 391 m (1,283 ft)

Population (2025-12-31)
  - Total: 186
  - Density: 42.4/km^{2} (110/sq mi)
- Time zone: UTC+01:00 (CET)
  - Summer (DST): UTC+02:00 (CEST)
- Postal codes: 66919
- Dialling codes: 06375
- Vehicle registration: PS

Hettenhausen is a municipality in Südwestpfalz district, in Rhineland-Palatinate, western Germany.
