= Schauerberg =

- Municipality
- Coat of arms

- Location of Schauerberg within Südwestpfalz district
- Interactive map of Schauerberg
- Location within Germany Location within Rhineland-Palatinate
- Coordinates: 49°18′52″N 7°34′33″E
- Country: Germany
- State: Rhineland-Palatinate
- District: Südwestpfalz
- Municipal assoc.: Thaleischweiler-Wallhalben

Government
  - Mayor (2019–24): Martin Eichert

Area
  - Total: 4.08 km^{2} (1.58 sq mi)
- Elevation: 308 m (1,010 ft)

Population (2025-12-31)
  - Total: 187
  - Density: 45.8/km^{2} (119/sq mi)
- Time zone: UTC+01:00 (CET)
  - Summer (DST): UTC+02:00 (CEST)
- Postal codes: 66919
- Dialling codes: 06375
- Vehicle registration: PS
- Website: www.wallhalben.de

Schauerberg (German pronunciation: [ˈʃaʊɐbɛʁk]) is a municipality in Südwestpfalz district, in Rhineland-Palatinate, western Germany.
