= Hütschenhausen =

- Municipality
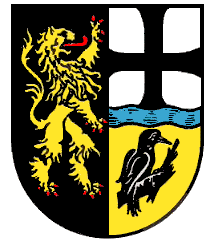
- Coat of arms

- Location of Hütschenhausen within Kaiserslautern district
- Interactive map of Hütschenhausen
- Location within Germany Location within Rhineland-Palatinate
- Coordinates: 49°25′08″N 7°28′50″E
- Country: Germany
- State: Rhineland-Palatinate
- District: Kaiserslautern
- Municipal assoc.: Ramstein-Miesenbach
- Subdivisions: 3

Government
  - Mayor (2019–24): Matthias Mahl (CDU)

Area
  - Total: 18.03 km^{2} (6.96 sq mi)
- Elevation: 240 m (790 ft)

Population (2025-12-31)
  - Total: 3,950
  - Density: 219/km^{2} (567/sq mi)
- Time zone: UTC+01:00 (CET)
  - Summer (DST): UTC+02:00 (CEST)
- Postal codes: 66882
- Dialling codes: 06372 (Hütschenhausen), 06371 (Spesbach und Katzenbach)
- Vehicle registration: KL
- Website: www.huetschenhausen.de

Hütschenhausen (German pronunciation: [hʏtʃn̩ˈhaʊzn̩]) is a municipality in the district of Kaiserslautern, in Rhineland-Palatinate, Western Germany.

== Sons and daughters of the community ==
- Julius Koh (1884 – after 1936), chemist and manager of the chemical industry
- Julius Rüb (1886–1968), politician (SPD)
- Conny Plank (1940–1987), music producer
- Gerd Itzek (born 1947), politician (SPD)
