= Rieschweiler-Mühlbach =

- Municipality
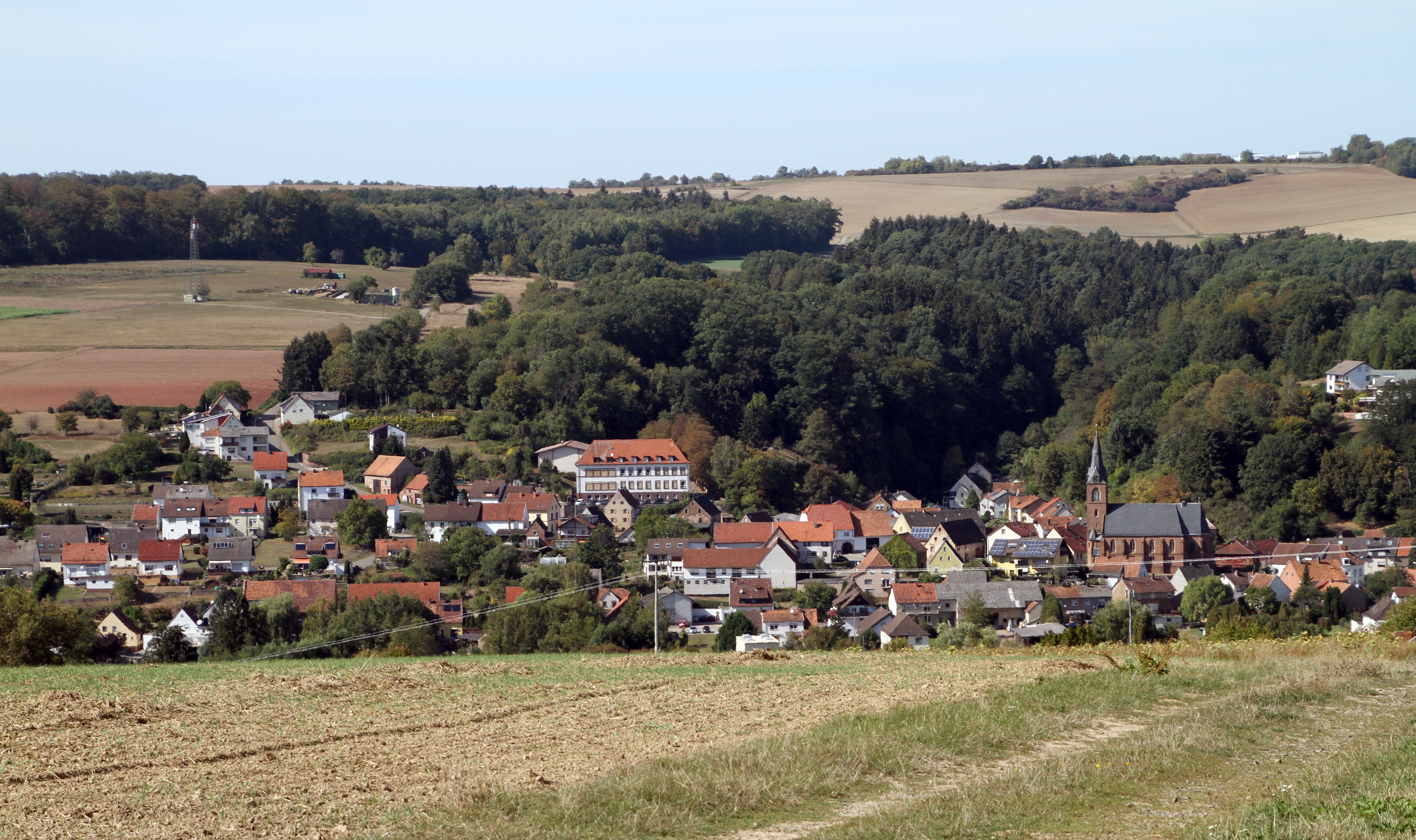

- Coat of arms

- Location of Rieschweiler-Mühlbach within Südwestpfalz district
- Interactive map of Rieschweiler-Mühlbach
- Location within Germany Location within Rhineland-Palatinate
- Coordinates: 49°14′48″N 7°30′15″E
- Country: Germany
- State: Rhineland-Palatinate
- District: Südwestpfalz
- Municipal assoc.: Thaleischweiler-Wallhalben

Government
  - Mayor (2019–24): Peter Roschy (SPD)

Area
  - Total: 10.42 km^{2} (4.02 sq mi)
- Elevation: 320 m (1,050 ft)

Population (2025-12-31)
  - Total: 1,985
  - Density: 190.5/km^{2} (493.4/sq mi)
- Time zone: UTC+01:00 (CET)
  - Summer (DST): UTC+02:00 (CEST)
- Postal codes: 66509
- Dialling codes: 06336
- Vehicle registration: PS

Rieschweiler-Mühlbach is a municipality in Südwestpfalz district, in Rhineland-Palatinate, western Germany.

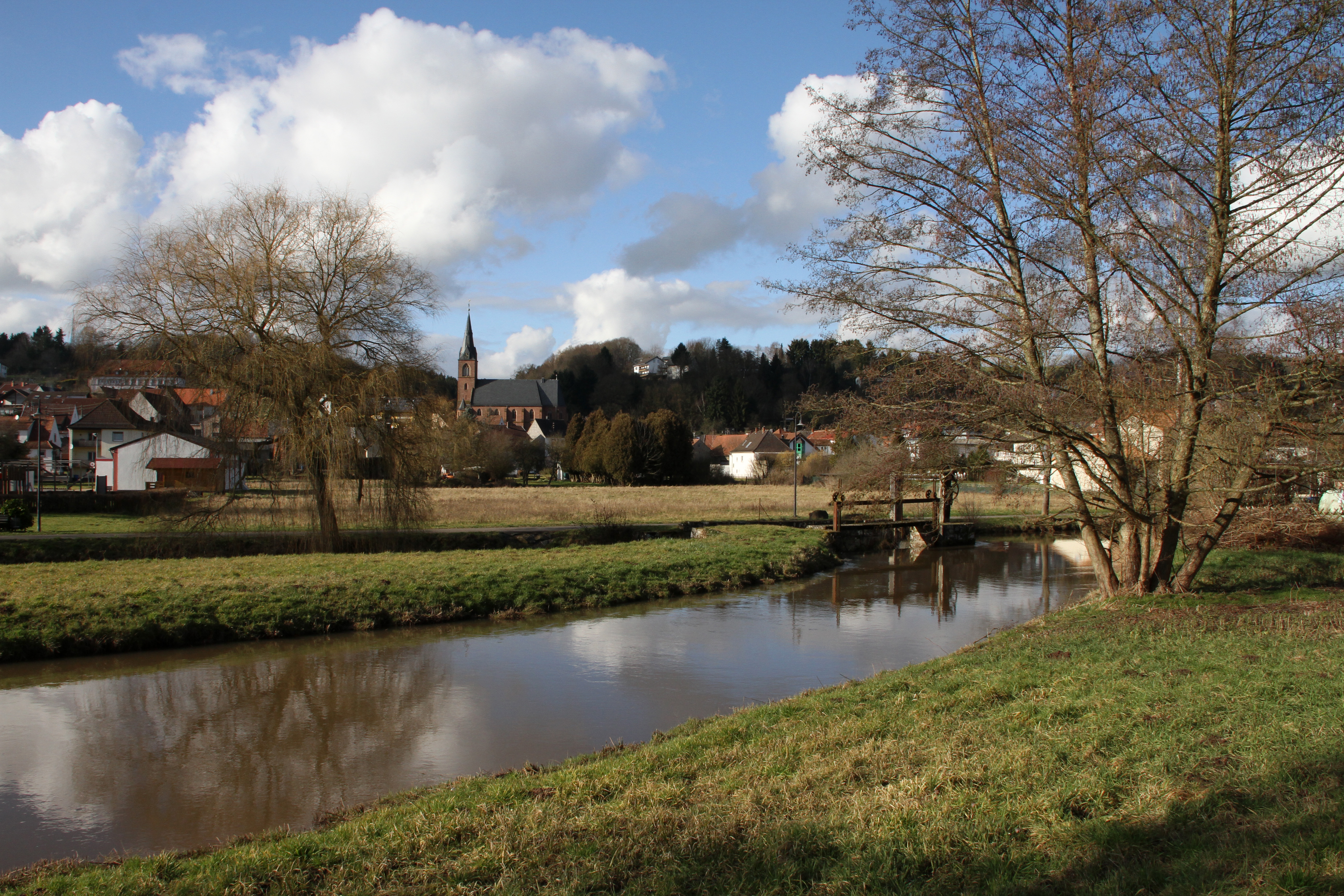
Mill creek and Protestant church
