= Herschberg =

- Municipality
- Coat of arms

- Location of Herschberg within Südwestpfalz district
- Interactive map of Herschberg
- Location within Germany Location within Rhineland-Palatinate
- Coordinates: 49°18′17″N 7°32′50″E
- Country: Germany
- State: Rhineland-Palatinate
- District: Südwestpfalz
- Municipal assoc.: Thaleischweiler-Wallhalben

Government
  - Mayor (2019–24): Andreas Schneider

Area
  - Total: 11.55 km^{2} (4.46 sq mi)
- Elevation: 367 m (1,204 ft)

Population (2025-12-31)
  - Total: 802
  - Density: 69.4/km^{2} (180/sq mi)
- Time zone: UTC+01:00 (CET)
  - Summer (DST): UTC+02:00 (CEST)
- Postal codes: 66919
- Dialling codes: 06375
- Vehicle registration: PS
- Website: www.gemeinde-herschberg.de

Herschberg (German pronunciation: [ˈhɛʁʃbɛʁk]) is a municipality in Südwestpfalz district, in Rhineland-Palatinate, western Germany.

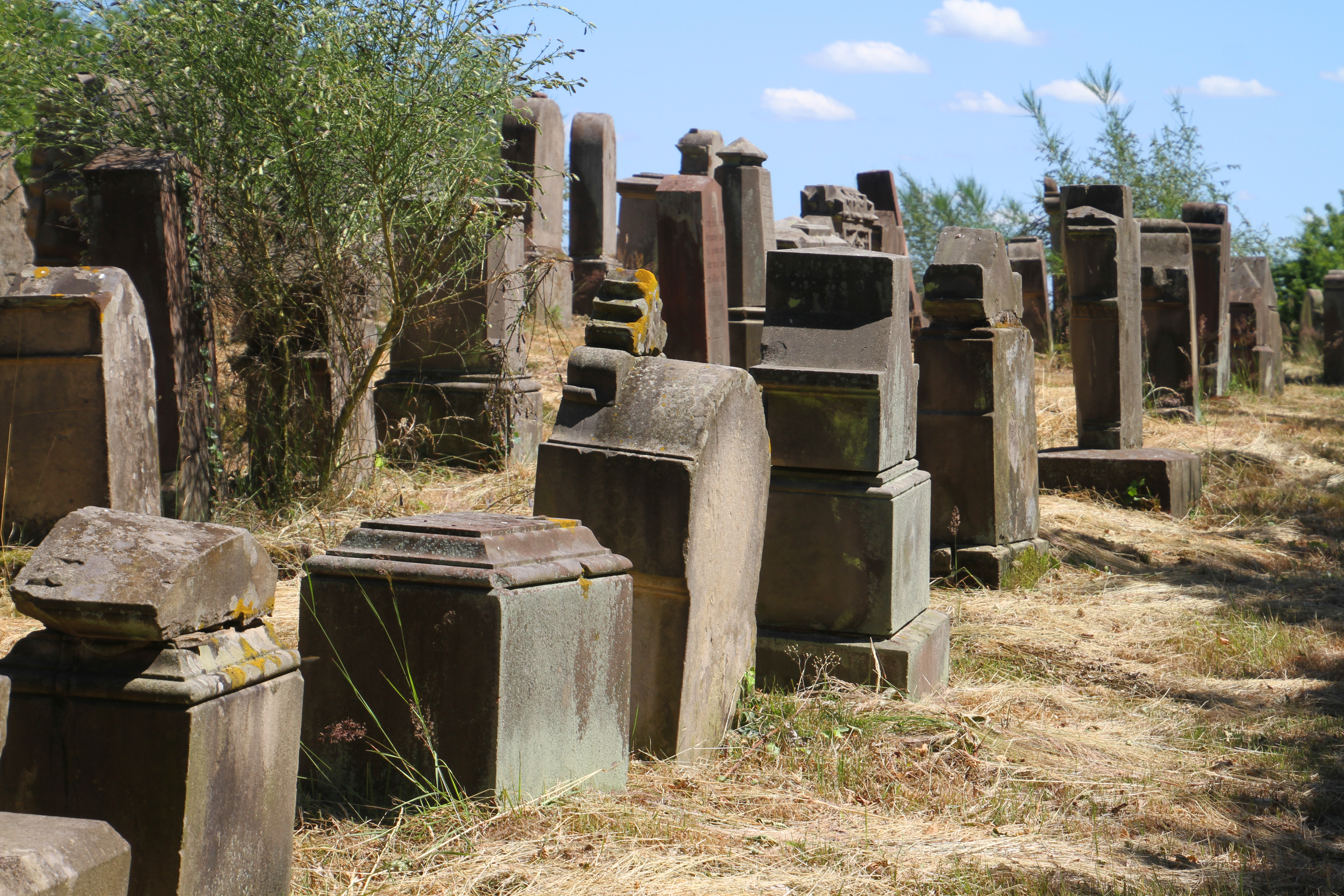
Jewish cemetery
