= Winterbach, Südwestpfalz =

Winterbach
- Municipality
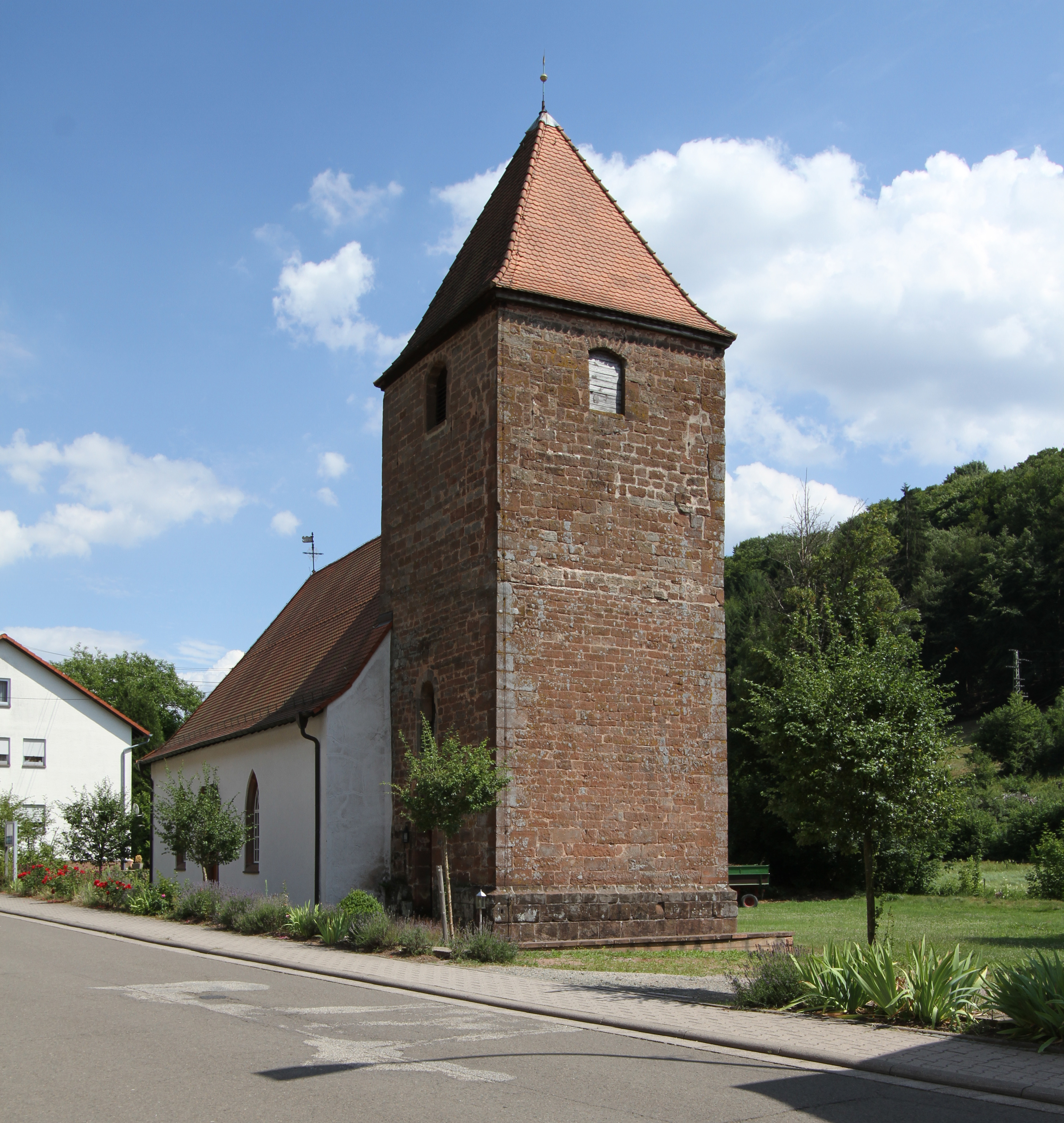
- Protestant parish church

- Coat of arms

- Location of Winterbach within Südwestpfalz district
- Interactive map of Winterbach
- Location within Germany Location within Rhineland-Palatinate
- Coordinates: 49°18′14″N 7°28′17″E
- Country: Germany
- State: Rhineland-Palatinate
- District: Südwestpfalz
- Municipal assoc.: Thaleischweiler-Wallhalben

Government
  - Mayor (2019–24): Andreas Weizel

Area
  - Total: 7.03 km^{2} (2.71 sq mi)
- Elevation: 250 m (820 ft)

Population (2025-12-31)
  - Total: 503
  - Density: 71.6/km^{2} (185/sq mi)
- Time zone: UTC+01:00 (CET)
  - Summer (DST): UTC+02:00 (CEST)
- Postal codes: 66484
- Dialling codes: 06337
- Vehicle registration: PS

Winterbach (German pronunciation: [ˈvɪntɐbax]) is a municipality in the district of Südwestpfalz, in Rhineland-Palatinate, in western Germany.

It is 12 km northeast of the city of Zweibrucken, and 20 km northwest of the city of Pirmasens.

For a period of time, Sudwestpfalz was part of Bavaria.
