= Höheischweiler =

- Municipality
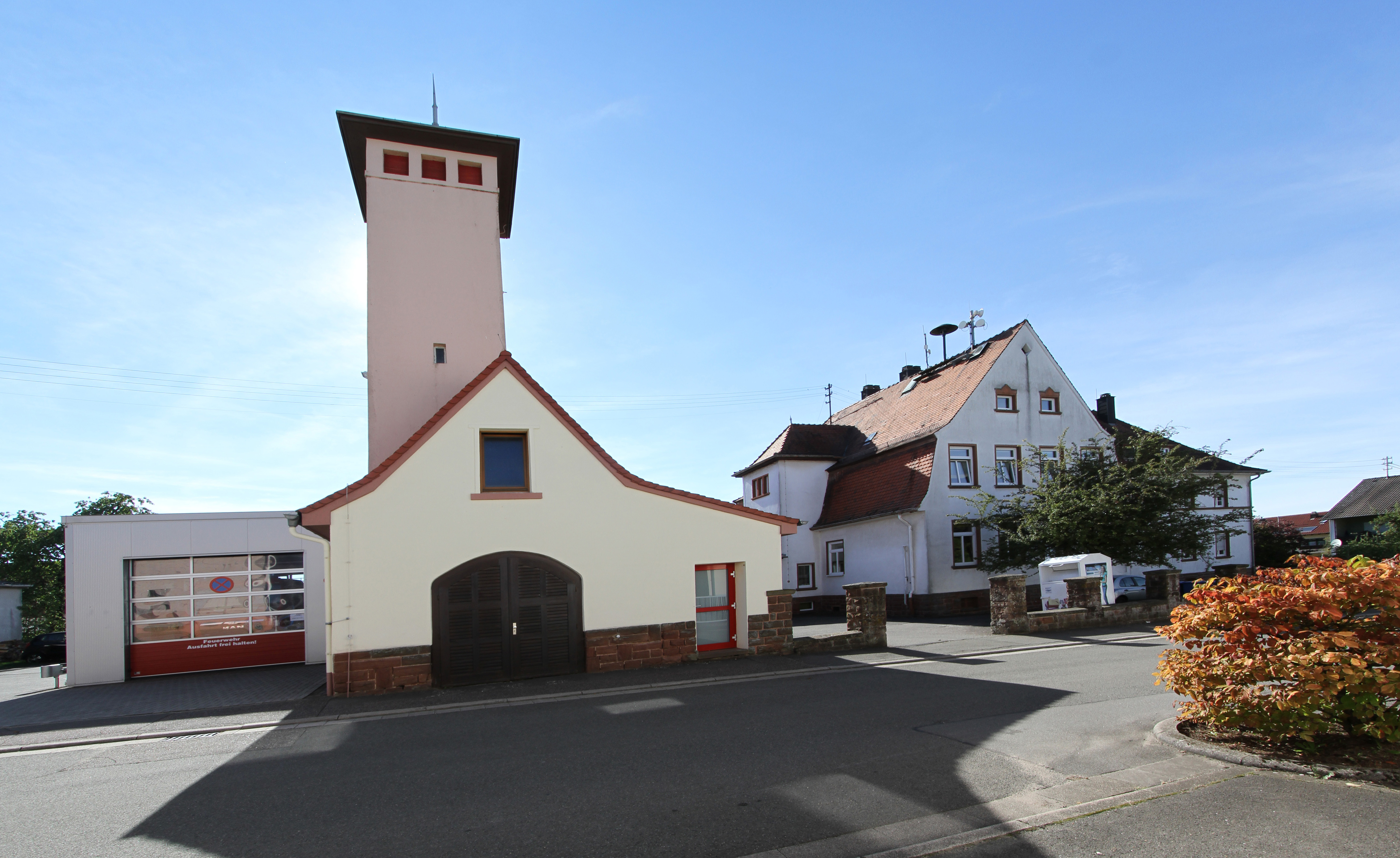

- Coat of arms

- Location of Höheischweiler within Südwestpfalz district
- Interactive map of Höheischweiler
- Location within Germany Location within Rhineland-Palatinate
- Coordinates: 49°13′47″N 7°32′49″E
- Country: Germany
- State: Rhineland-Palatinate
- District: Südwestpfalz
- Municipal assoc.: Thaleischweiler-Wallhalben

Government
  - Mayor (2019–24): Ricarda Holub

Area
  - Total: 4.36 km^{2} (1.68 sq mi)
- Elevation: 344 m (1,129 ft)

Population (2025-12-31)
  - Total: 777
  - Density: 178/km^{2} (462/sq mi)
- Time zone: UTC+01:00 (CET)
  - Summer (DST): UTC+02:00 (CEST)
- Postal codes: 66989
- Dialling codes: 06331
- Vehicle registration: PS

Höheischweiler is a municipality in Südwestpfalz district, in Rhineland-Palatinate, western Germany.
