= Reifenberg =

- Municipality
- Coat of arms

- Location of Reifenberg within Südwestpfalz district
- Interactive map of Reifenberg
- Location within Germany Location within Rhineland-Palatinate
- Coordinates: 49°16′56″N 7°30′32″E
- Country: Germany
- State: Rhineland-Palatinate
- District: Südwestpfalz
- Municipal assoc.: Thaleischweiler-Wallhalben

Government
  - Mayor (2019–24): Pirmin Zimmer (CDU)

Area
  - Total: 7.73 km^{2} (2.98 sq mi)
- Elevation: 350 m (1,150 ft)

Population (2025-12-31)
  - Total: 779
  - Density: 101/km^{2} (261/sq mi)
- Time zone: UTC+01:00 (CET)
  - Summer (DST): UTC+02:00 (CEST)
- Postal codes: 66507
- Dialling codes: 06375
- Vehicle registration: PS
- Website: www.vgtw.de

Reifenberg (German pronunciation: [ˈʁaɪfn̩bɛʁk]) is a municipality in Südwestpfalz district, in Rhineland-Palatinate, western Germany.

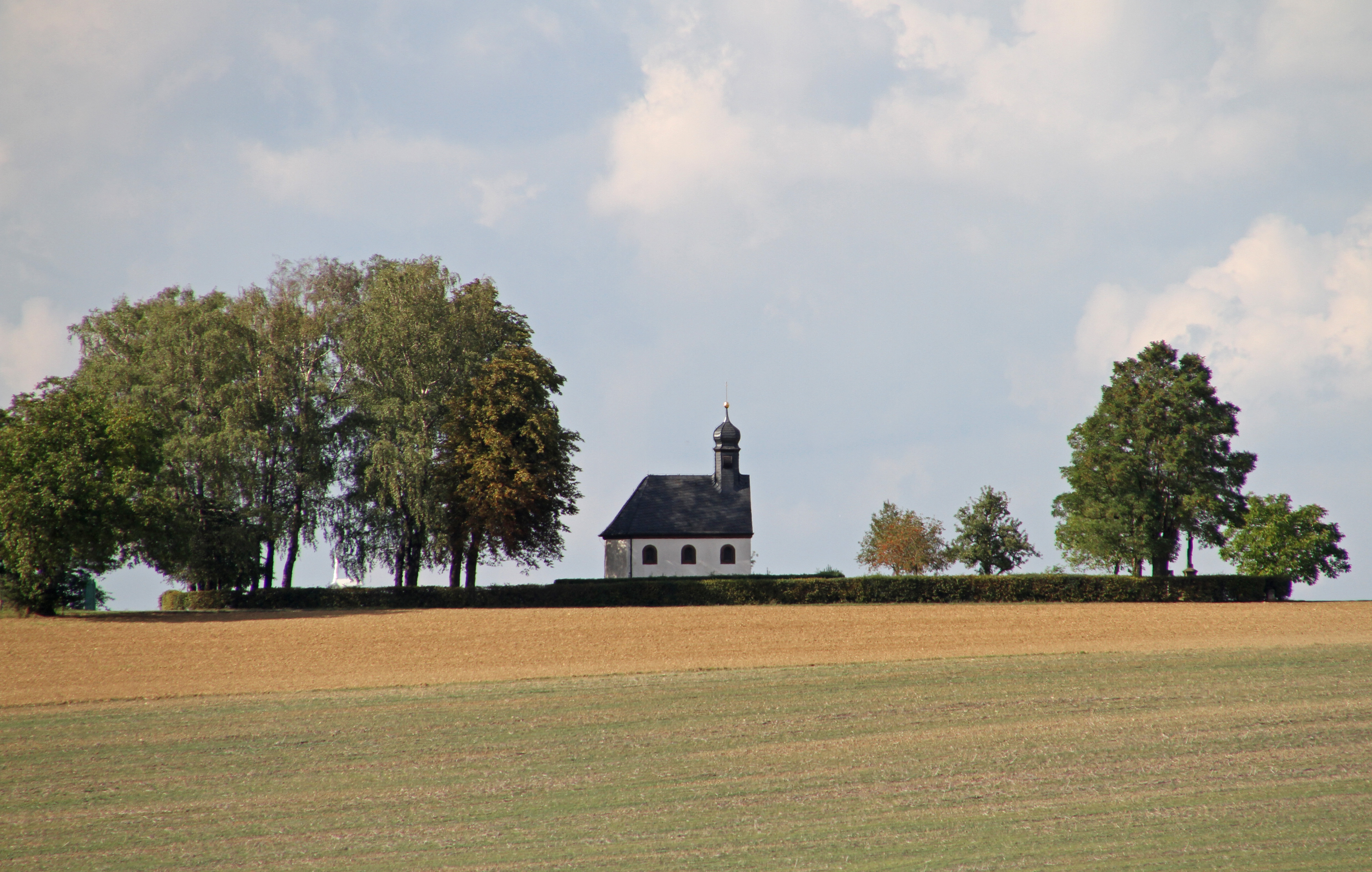
Chapel at Häselberg
