= Biedershausen =

- Municipality
- Coat of arms

- Location of Biedershausen within Südwestpfalz district
- Interactive map of Biedershausen
- Location within Germany Location within Rhineland-Palatinate
- Coordinates: 49°19′05″N 7°29′8″E
- Country: Germany
- State: Rhineland-Palatinate
- District: Südwestpfalz
- Municipal assoc.: Thaleischweiler-Wallhalben

Government
  - Mayor (2019–24): Christian Bühler

Area
  - Total: 3.65 km^{2} (1.41 sq mi)
- Elevation: 306 m (1,004 ft)

Population (2025-12-31)
  - Total: 181
  - Density: 49.6/km^{2} (128/sq mi)
- Time zone: UTC+01:00 (CET)
  - Summer (DST): UTC+02:00 (CEST)
- Postal codes: 66917
- Dialling codes: 06375
- Vehicle registration: PS

Biedershausen is a municipality in Südwestpfalz district, in Rhineland-Palatinate, western Germany.
