= Wallhalben =

- Municipality
- Coat of arms

- Location of Wallhalben within Südwestpfalz district
- Interactive map of Wallhalben
- Location within Germany Location within Rhineland-Palatinate
- Coordinates: 49°19′1″N 7°31′38″E
- Country: Germany
- State: Rhineland-Palatinate
- District: Südwestpfalz
- Municipal assoc.: Thaleischweiler-Wallhalben

Government
  - Mayor (2019–24): Christine Burkhard

Area
  - Total: 4.87 km^{2} (1.88 sq mi)
- Elevation: 312 m (1,024 ft)

Population (2025-12-31)
  - Total: 800
  - Density: 160/km^{2} (430/sq mi)
- Time zone: UTC+01:00 (CET)
  - Summer (DST): UTC+02:00 (CEST)
- Postal codes: 66917
- Dialling codes: 06375
- Vehicle registration: PS
- Website: www.wallhalben.de

Wallhalben is a municipality in the Südwestpfalz district, in Rhineland-Palatinate, Germany. It is situated approximately 15 km northwest of Pirmasens, and 15 km northeast of Zweibrücken.

Until 1 July 2014, when it became part of the Verbandsgemeinde ("collective municipality") Thaleischweiler-Wallhalben, Wallhalben was the seat of the Verbandsgemeinde Wallhalben.

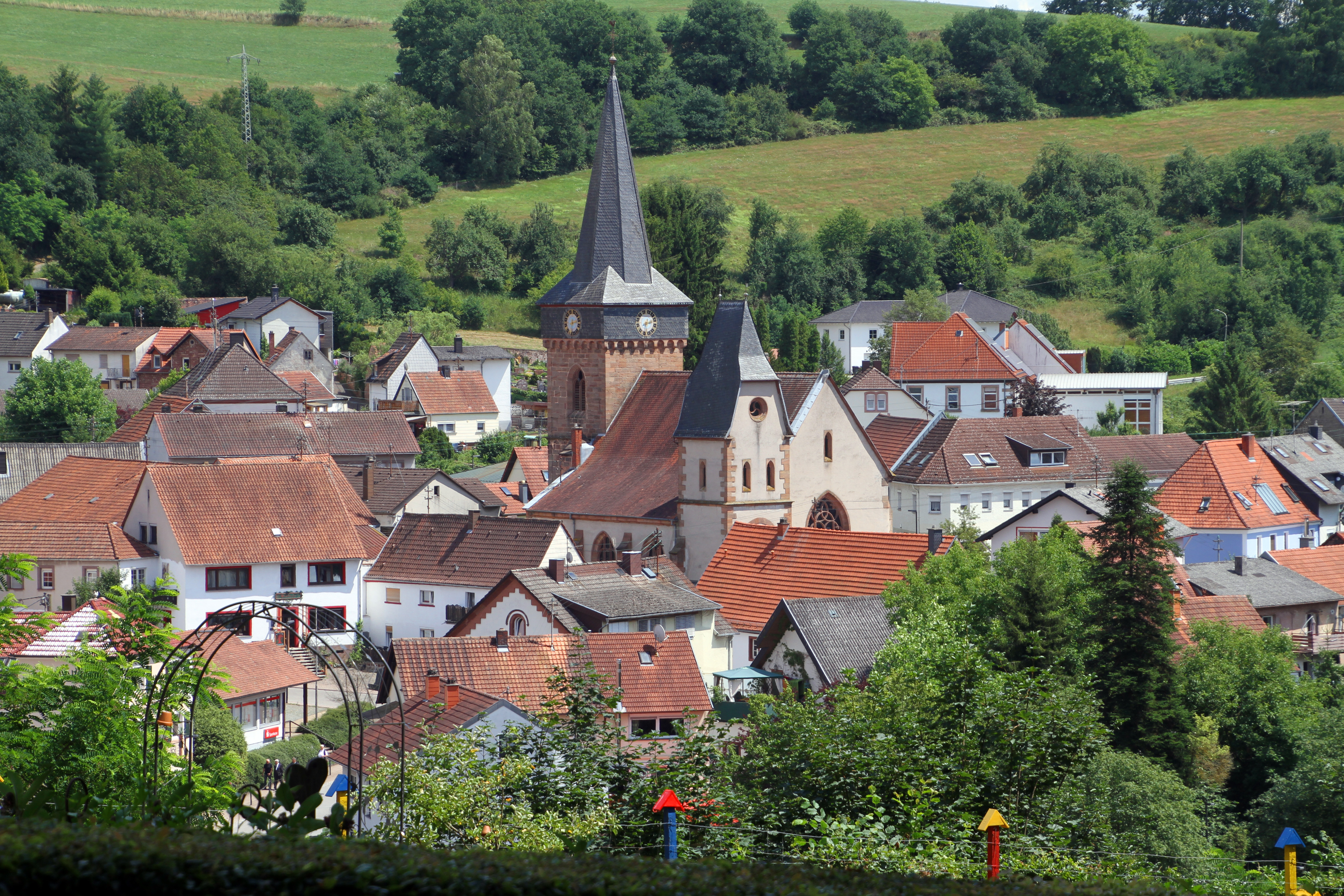
View to Wallhalben
