= Krähenberg =

- Municipality
- Coat of arms

- Location of Krähenberg within Südwestpfalz district
- Interactive map of Krähenberg
- Location within Germany Location within Rhineland-Palatinate
- Coordinates: 49°19′37″N 7°27′53″E
- Country: Germany
- State: Rhineland-Palatinate
- District: Südwestpfalz
- Municipal assoc.: Thaleischweiler-Wallhalben

Government
  - Mayor (2019–24): Thomas Martin

Area
  - Total: 4.4 km^{2} (1.7 sq mi)
- Elevation: 365 m (1,198 ft)

Population (2025-12-31)
  - Total: 157
  - Density: 36/km^{2} (92/sq mi)
- Time zone: UTC+01:00 (CET)
  - Summer (DST): UTC+02:00 (CEST)
- Postal codes: 66894
- Dialling codes: 06337
- Vehicle registration: PS

Krähenberg (German pronunciation: [ˈkʁɛːənbɛʁk]) is a municipality in Südwestpfalz district, in Rhineland-Palatinate, western Germany.
