= Waterway trail on the Moosalbe =

Coordinates: 49°21′17″N 7°45′06″E

Waterway trail on the Moosalbe German: Wässerwanderweg an der Moosalbe
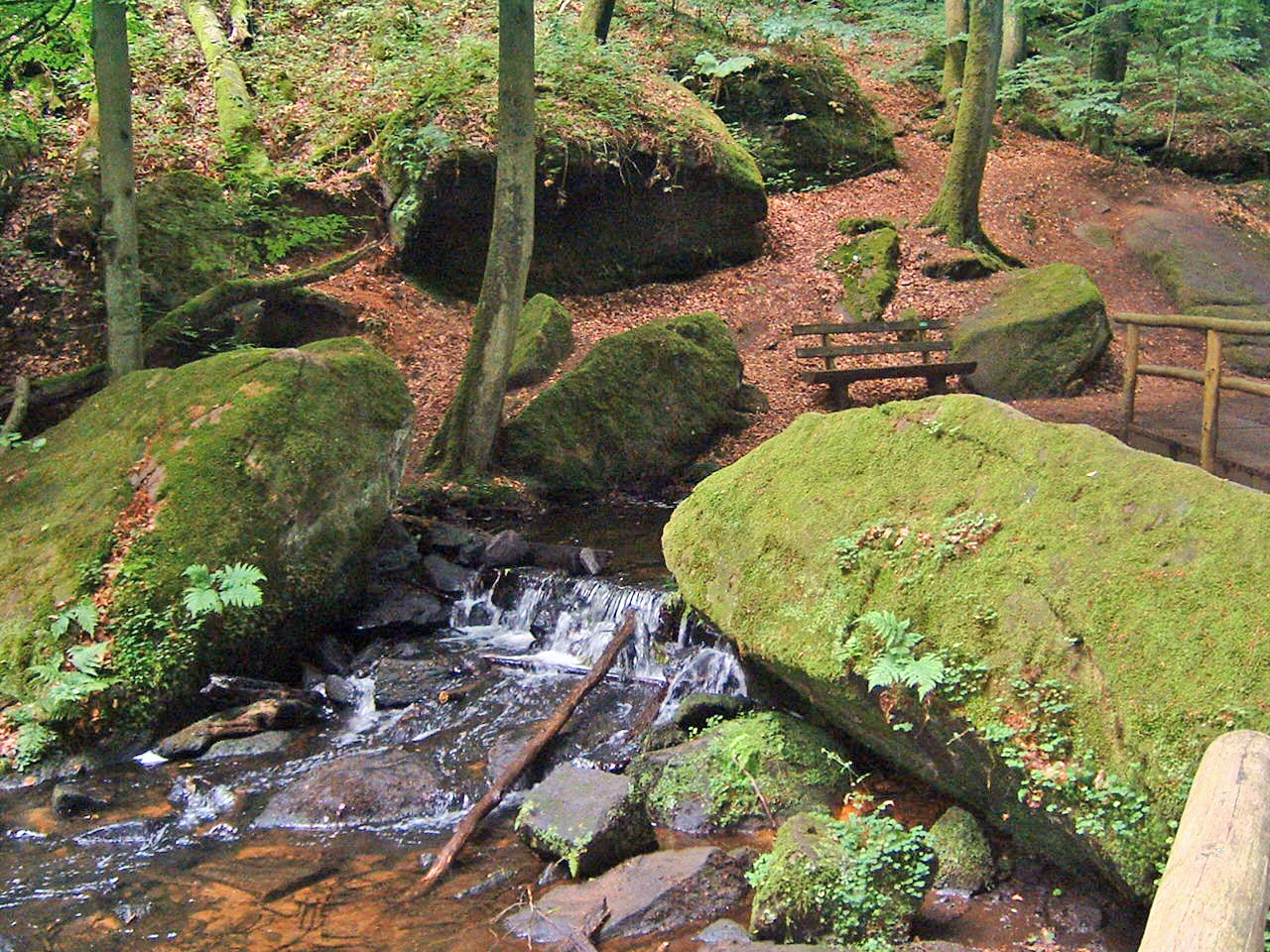
- The Moosalb(e) in the Karlstal valley
- Length: 33 km (21 mi)
- Location: Palatine Forest
- Trailheads: Klug'sche Mühle near Trippstadt, DE-RP
- Use: Hiking
- Highest point: 473 m, Johanniskreuz
- Lowest point: ca. 300 m, powder mill near Schopp
- Difficulty: easy
- Season: all year round
- Waymark: No, circular path
- Maintainer: Thematic trail of the Ministry of the Environment and Forestry Rhineland-Palatinate

The Waterway trail on the Moosalbe (German: Gewässerwanderweg an der Moosalbe) is one of seven themed walks on the subject of hydrology in the German state of Rhineland-Palatinate. The path runs for over 33 km along the Moosalbe and Hirschalbe streams through the Palatine Forest and has 23 way stations.

Documentation by the State Ministry for the Environment and Forests describes the route and gives detailed information on the geology, hydrology und climate of the area.

== Route ==
The following significant water management stations connected with mills, weirs, wells, springs, waterbodies and ecosystems lie on the route:

1. Klug'sche Mühle, a mill with weir and mill pond
2. Fischweiher source (source of the Karlstal)
3. Fish breeding ponds
4. Unterhammer, with a weir for driving the iron hammer mill
5. Hummocky meadow (Buckelwiesen), an irrigation scheme
6. Weir (Stauwehr)
7. Iron smelting (Eisenschmelz)
8. Stelzenberg Waterworks and spring
9. Friends of Nature house of Finsterbrunnertal
10. Rolling mill (Walzwerk)
11. Borehole (Tiefbrunnen) III
12. Engtalbach waterway management (Gewässerausbau) near Krickenbach
13. Old Pumphouse (Altes Pumpwerk) in the parish of Schopp
14. Natural section of the Moosalbe near Schopp
15. Powder mill pond (Pulvermühlweiher)
16. Powder mill (Pulvermühle), ruins of the old factory that produced black powder
17. Hirschalb valley and mill (Hirschalbtal and Hirschalbmühle)
18. Source of the Moosalbe
19. Tiefenteich spring
20. Submerged spring (Grundquelle), near Tiefenteich
21. Langspateliges Laichkraut
22. Oberhammer Waterworks with Boreholes 1 and 2 (near Trippstadt)
23. Karlstal Gorge with its cave house and the Amseldell

== See also ==
- Walking routes in the Palatine Forest
