= Biebermühl Railway =

Railway line in Germany

Coordinates: 49°18′47.3″N 7°39′41.6″E

Kaiserslautern–Pirmasens railway
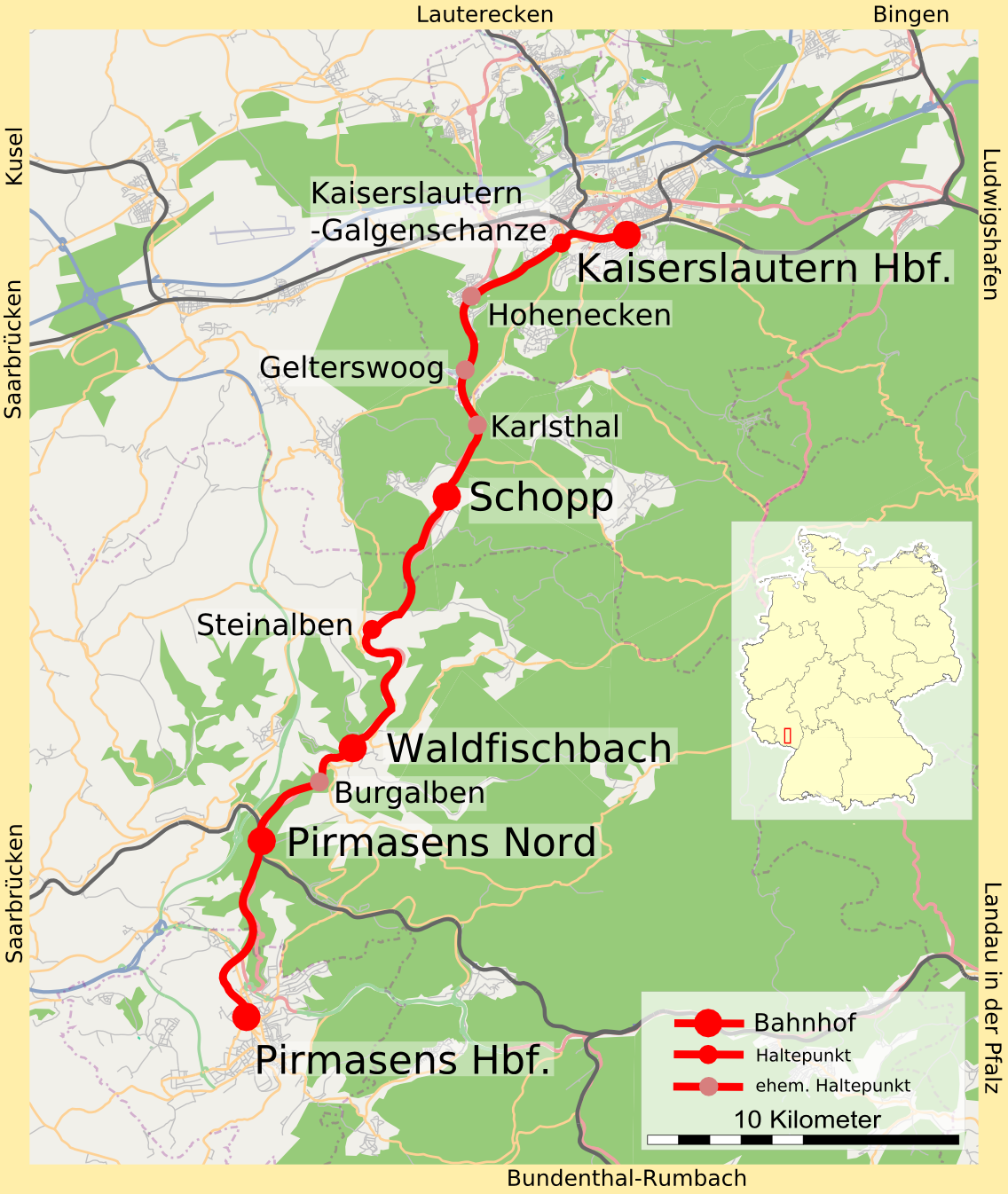

Overview
- Line number: 3300 (Kaiserslautern–Pirmasens Nord); 3310 (Pirmasens Nord–Pirmasens)
- Locale: Rhineland-Palatinate, Germany

Service
- Route number: 672

Technical
- Line length: 35.9 km (22.3 mi)
- Track gauge: 1,435 mm (4 ft 8 1/2 in) standard gauge
- Minimum radius: 250 m (820 ft)
- Maximum incline: 2.5%

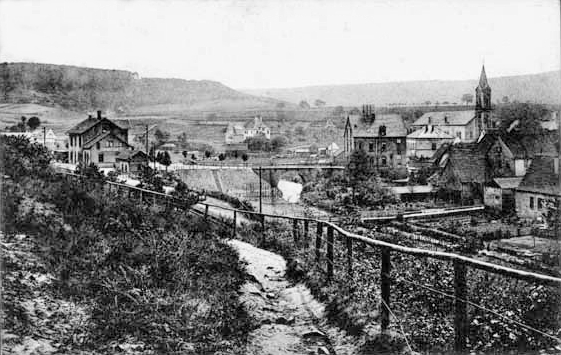
Waldfischbach station (left) in 1916

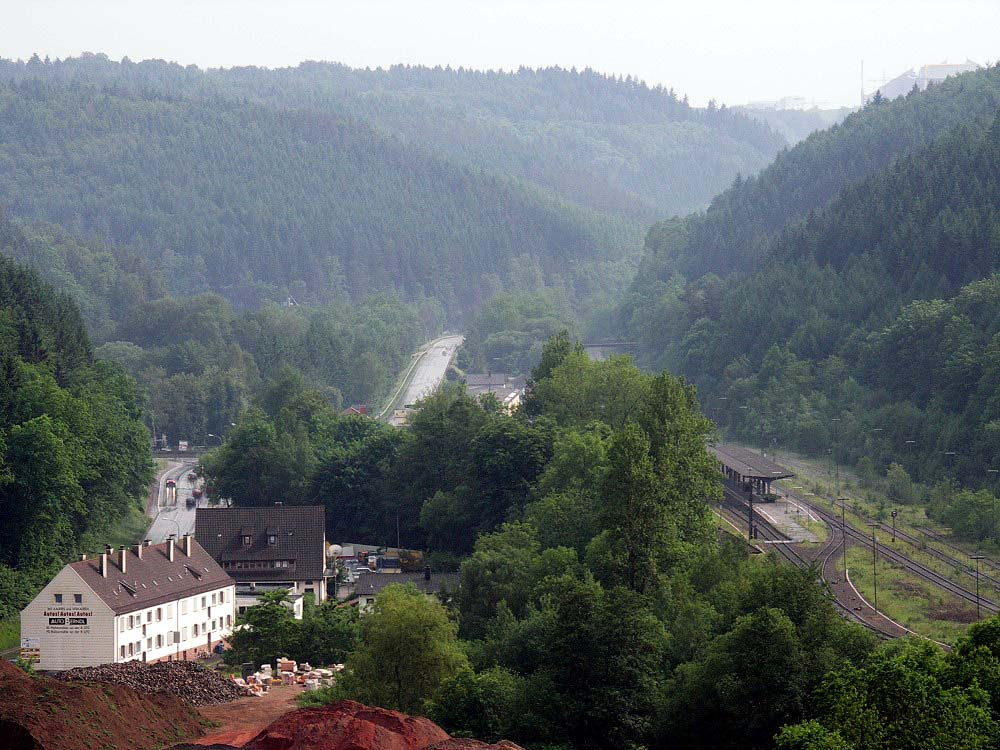
Bird's eye view of Pirmasens Nord station (right)

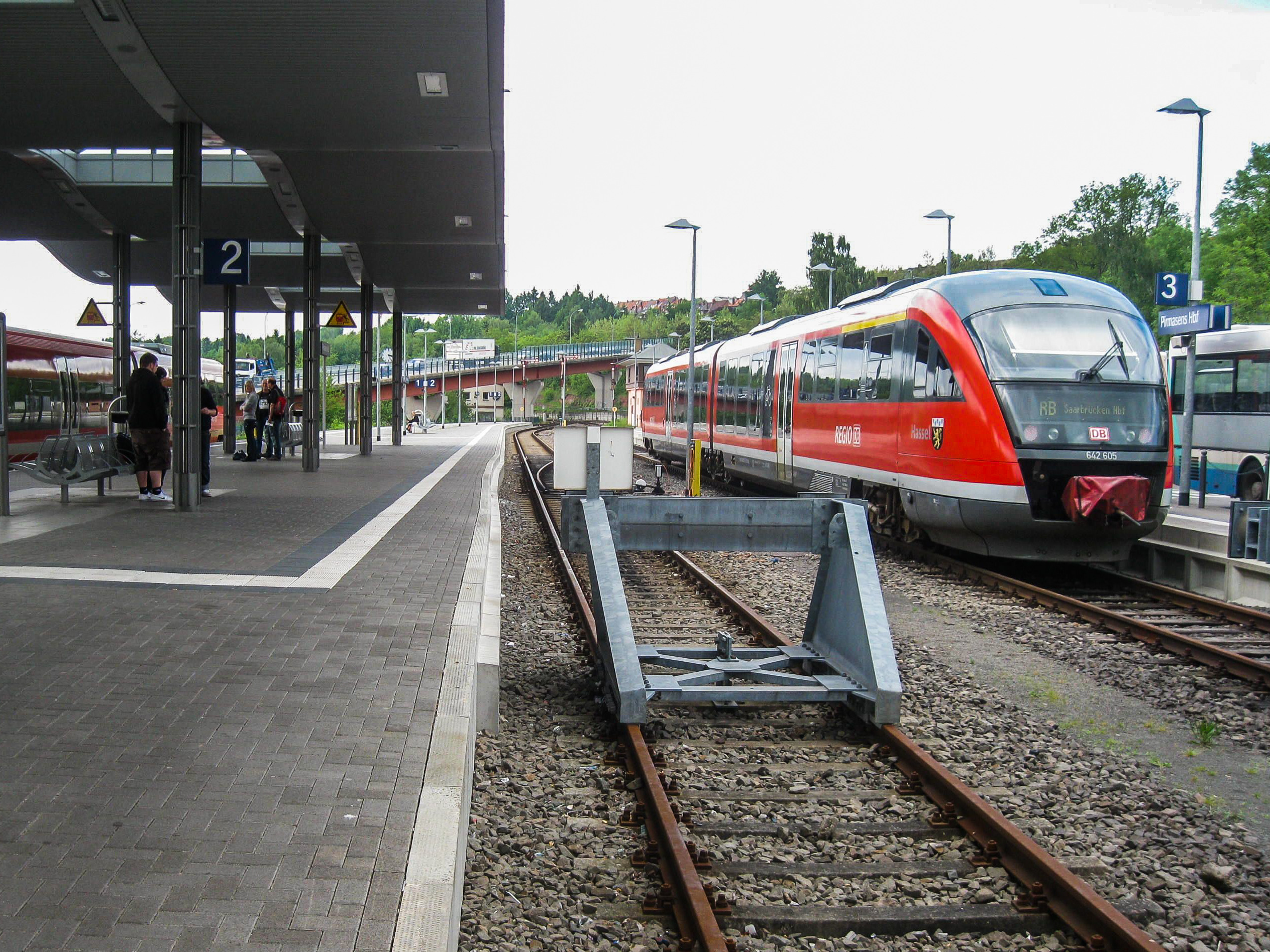
Pirmasens Hauptbahnhof

The Biebermühl Railway (German: Biebermühlbahn)—sometimes called the Moosalbbahn (Moosalb Railway)—is a 35.9 km long railway line from Kaiserslautern to Pirmasens in the German state of Rhineland-Palatinate, which was built between 1875 and 1913. The first section between Biebermühle (now Pirmasens Nord station) and Pirmasens connected the city of Pirmasens to the railway network, which could only be achieved via a branch line due to the topography. In 1905, another branch was opened from Biebermühl to Waldfischbach, which was extended in 1913 to Kaiserslautern. It was subsequently used by long-distance services, which operated until 1990. Since then, it has been used only by local services. It is the only one of all the Palatine railway lines that were completed in the 20th century that have never been threatened with closure.

== History ==
=== First aspirations (1864–1867) ===
The first efforts to create a railway connection from Kaiserslautern to Pirmasens go back to the 1860s. Above all, the municipality Schopp was fiercely committed to a connection. The first proposal from 1864 suggested a route through Vogelweh, Hohenecken, Schopp, Biebermühle and Rodalben.

In the following year, a committee, to which representatives from Kaiserslautern, Waldfischbach and Schopp belonged, noted several advantages of such a route. It would benefit Pirmasens with its industry, the transport of timber in the areas of Johanniskreuz, Leimen, Lemberg, Merzalben, Ruppertsweiler, Trippstadt and Waldfischbach, the gravel pits in Heltersberg, Rodalben, Schmalenberg and Waldfischbach and the agriculture of the neighbouring Sickingen Heights and services for visitors to the waterfalls of the region.

In 1866, another proposal for a route was put forward, which was largely followed by the current route. Bavaria, which controlled the Circle of the Rhine (Rheinkreis) in which the planned line was located, gave the planned line from Landau to Zweibrücken higher priority. The proposed connection between Kaiserslautern and Pirmasens was not considered by the Ministry of Trade to be useful because of the difficult topography and the thin settlement.

=== Origins of the Biebermühle–Pirmasens branch line ===
The town of Pirmasens hoped for a connection to the railway network with the construction of the planned Landau–Zweibrücken line. As it soon became apparent that due to the difficult topography of the Palatinate Forest (Pfälzerwald) and the associated high costs of building a line in this area, it was unlikely that the line could be built through Pirmasens. There were intense discussions in the town. Some members of the town council argued that a branch line would significantly weaken the town.

The council therefore continued to favour a direct link via the planned South Palatine Railway (Südpfalzstrecke) between Landau and Zweibrücken. There were two options under discussion. The first would have involved a station built in the Dankelsbach Valley; this would have required careful tunnelling under the town. It was dropped quickly. The second ran further south via Ruppertsweiler with a station near Niedersimten. The Bavarian government, however, favoured the connection by means of a branch line. The majority of the town council finally voted 24:14 in favour of the government's draft plan because a station in the Niedersimten area could not have been regarded as a direct connection and would have meant that a later connection to Kaiserslautern no longer had any chance of being realised.

The branch line would branch off from the planned main line in the hamlet of Biebermühle where a junction station was to be built, run mainly along the Steinbach and end on the northern outskirts of Pirmasens at the military training ground. It was opened together with the Annweiler–Zweibrücken section of the main line on 25 November 1875. The operator was the Palatine Ludwig Railway Company (Pfalzische Ludwigsbahn-Gesellschaft), which had already become part of the Palatinate Railways (Pfälzische Eisenbahnen) with its operational merger with the remaining Palatinate railways in 1870.

The planning of what was intended to be a single-track line, however, suffered from an error. Due to its very late rise out of the Steinbach Valley, the crest of the line would only be reached at the beginning of the tunnel at the entrance to Pirmasens. As a result, trains that were brought to a halt at the end of the climb or in the tunnel could not be started again. Therefore, Deutsche Reichsbahn later decided to build a second track, which began the climb much earlier—directly at the exit from Biebermühle station—to reach the new tunnel over a gentler and more even gradient. (See also Further developments section )

=== Connection to Kaiserslautern ===
Like the South Palatine Railway, the main line to Pirmasens mainly served freight transport. However, the efforts to extend the Pirmasens line to the Kaiserslautern did not end. As early as the 1860s, the district council of Waldfischbach had criticised the planned route of the Landau–Zweibrücken line. In 1872, the Palatine Railway received a request from the city of Kaiserslautern, which related to the planned connection to Pirmasens. Its director, Albert von Jäger replied that the organisation had to deal with so many projects that the line could not be built. Another, also unsuccessful request, was made in 1887.

In 1894, a plan was issued on behalf of the mayor's office of Kaiserslautern, with construction costs amounting to 4.4 million marks, of which about one third was for reconstruction of the stations of Kaiserslautern and Biebermühle. A year later this was forwarded to the government in Munich. Jakob von Lavale, the successor of Jäger who had died in the meantime, turned down the proposal. Thereupon a meeting took place in the Kaiserslauter Fruchthalle, which resulted in a protest against this position. This led to several proposals on how to progress the matter.

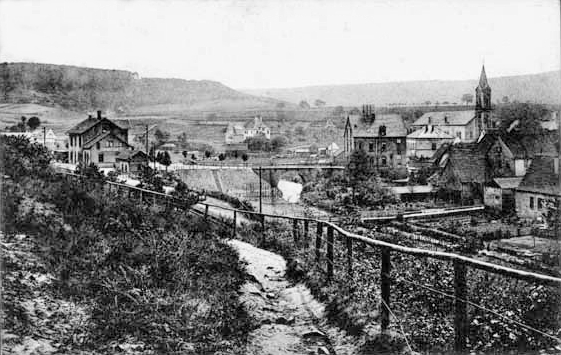
Waldfischbach station (left) in 1916

On 29 May 1900 a law was passed on "the development of railways of local importance in the Palatinate", which guaranteed railway construction. Two years later a concession was issued for the Biebermühle–Waldfischbach section. After about one year of construction, the corresponding 5.13 kilometre section was opened on 1 June 1904 with only one intervening station at Burgalben. Thus, Biebermühle station became a junction station with four branches. In 1909, the operation of the two lines became part of the Royal Bavarian State Railways (Königlich Bayerischen Staats-Eisenbahnen). The gap was closed on 1 August 1913, when the Waldfischbach–Kaiserslautern section was completed.

=== Further developments ===
Later the Biebermühle–Burgalben section was rebuilt on a new route through the middle of the Schwarzbach valley (Schwarzbachtal) for military reasons. The line was absorbed into Deutsche Reichsbahn on 1 April 1920. In 1922, the line was integrated into the newly founded Reichsbahndirektion Ludwigshafen (railway division of Ludwigshafen). In 1923, the so-called Regiebetrieb (military operation) commenced, which meant that the railway was operated by the French military until the beginning of 1924. In the course of the dissolution of the railway division of Ludwigshafen, the Biebermühl Railway came under the management of Saarbrücken on 1 May 1936.

A major reconstruction of Biebermühle station, which has been called Pirmasens Nord since 1938, followed. In addition, it was decided to build a second track a separate route to improve operations between Pirmasens North and the Hauptbahnhof. A total of three options were available. One would have passed through Petersberg and would not have needed a tunnel. The second would have run parallel to the existing line, which it would have crossed shortly before Fehrbach Tunnel and would have then climbed through a 400-metre-long tunnel. The third option, which was finally implemented by the Reichsbahn, ran almost parallel to the old line, but started climbing earlier towards Pirmasens and thus obtained a more even and gentler slope. It has a tunnel that runs parallel to the original one. This was commissioned in 1939; the construction costs amounted to 5.6 million Reichsmarks. After the commissioning, it was used for the operation of the trains running uphill, while the old track was reserved for the downhill trains. In addition, a connecting curve was established north of Pirmasens Nord station, which was subsequently used by direct services running between Zweibrücken and Kaiserslautern over the Biebermühl Railway.

=== Post-war period and Deutsche Bundesbahn (1945–1993) ===
At the end of the Second World War, the original valley track (Talgleis) of the southern Pirmasens Nord-Pirmasens Hauptbahnhof section was broken in four places as a result of the fighting. These problems were quickly resolved. There was more damage between Waldfischbach and Steinalben, so that through operations between Pirmasens and Kaiserslautern were not restored until 1946.

During the French occupation, the railway line was under the control of the Betriebsvereinigung der Südwestdeutschen Eisenbahnen (Union of south-west German railways, SWDE) which was absorbed into the newly founded Deutsche Bundesbahn (DB) in 1949. The latter integrated the Biebermühl Railway into the railway division of Mainz, which was assigned all railway lines within the newly created state of Rhineland-Palatinate. There was a great increase in passenger traffic. In 1955, the newer mountain track (Berggleis) was re-activated on the southern section of the line, the reconstruction of which had been long delayed. The line became a part of the area of responsibility of the railway division of Trier during the dissolution of the railway division of Mainz on 1 August 1971.

Steam operations on the line ended on 25 September 1975. Gelterswoog station was closed two years later. In the 1980s, the closure of the halts of Galgenschanzem Hohenecken, Karlsthal and Burgalben followed. After many lines had been closed throughout the Western Palatinate, DB concluded an agreement with the state of Rhineland-Palatinate, which ensured the continuance of the Biebermühl Railway. At the end of the Cold War, from 1990 onwards, the line lost its importance as a strategic railway, which ultimately mainly depended on the American forces resident in the Pirmasens region.

=== Deutsche Bahn (since 1994) ===
In the course of the railway reform, the Biebermühl Railway became part of Deutsche Bahn (DB) in 1994. In the same year, interregional traffic ended on the neighbouring Landau–Rohrbach railway. With a few exceptions, the trains that had run from Pirmasens Nord had since run from the Hauptbahnhof, which meant an increase of services on the southern section of the Biebermühl Railway. On the section between Pirmasens Nord and Pirmasens Hauptbahnhof the older track, the so-called Talgleis, was closed in 1996, although it was not used on a regular basis since the 1960s. Just before the railway reform, its possible reactivation including the costs incurred had been investigated.

As part of the railway reform, the Zweckverband Schienenpersonennahverkehr Rheinland-Pfalz Süd (municipal association for rail transport of the southern Palatinate) has been responsible for the route since 1 January 1997. In this context, the Galgenschanze halt was reactivated.

The freight yard in Pirmasens was closed in December 1999; it was then dismantled along with its tracks. In 2000, it became part of the Westpfalz-Verkehrsverbund (Western Palatinate Transport Association, WVV), along with the other lines in the Western Palatinate, until it was absorbed into the Verkehrsverbund Rhein-Neckar (Rhine-Neckar Transport Association, VRN) six years later. Since 14 December 2008, the line has been part of the so-called Westpfalz-Netz (Western Palatinate network). This meant, for example, that from 7:00 pm all trains have attendants. Kaiserslautern-Hohenecken halt was to have been reactivated on 11 December 2011. Since the city of Kaiserslautern has not yet provided any funds, construction work has been postponed. 2013 was the centenary of the line; there were steam excursions on 15 September of that year.

In addition, the reactivation of the valley track between Pirmasens Nord and Pirmasens Hauptbahnhof has been discussed, as the mountain track has reached the limit of its capacity.

== Route ==
The Biebermühl Railway runs along the western edge of the Palatinate Forest (Pfälzerwald), through the Sickingen Heights (Sickinger Höhe). It is largely surrounded by forest over the whole route. It leaves the Kaiserslauter Hauptbahnhof to the west and runs parallel with the Mannheim-Saarbrücken railway and the Lauter Valley Railway. It leaves both lines and runs south to enter the Hohenecken Forest (Hohenecker Wald). In doing so, it grazes the eastern edge of the districts of Vogelweh and Hohenecken. The late closing of the gap between Kaiserslautern and Waldfischbach had the advantage, from a transport point of view, that the line was designed and built without level crossings with a state route built parallel to the line.

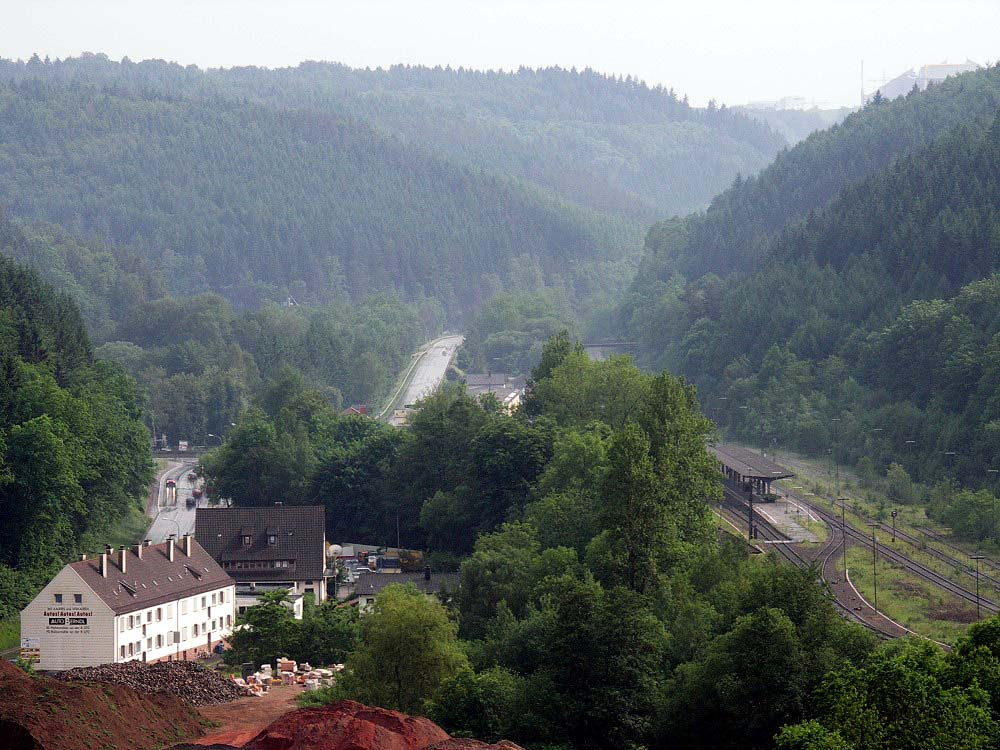
Pirmasens Nord station (right) from above, to the left is the hamlet of Biebermühle

After it has passed Gelterswoog, it follows the Aschbach to the mouth of the Moosalb at the western end of Karlstal. Shortly before Schopp it crosses federal highway 270 and runs along the Moosalb via Steinalben to Waldfischbach, where they meet the Schwarzbach valley (Schwarzbachtal). The line crosses the Schwarzbach three times before it reaches Pirmasens Nord. Coming from the west, the Landau–Rohrbach railway continues to the east, while the Biebermühl Railway continues to run to the south.

The remaining almost seven kilometres of the line is built through relatively steep terrain. Just before the terminal station of Pirmasens Hauptbahnhof, the line passes through the 887 metre-long Neue Fehrbacher Tunnel. In this section of the line, the new track, which was built in the 1930s, is used. It runs on a different elevation and has a more even slope, thus avoiding the steep ascending gradient to the tunnel of the old track.

From Kaiserslautern Hauptbahnhof to the abandoned Gelterswoog station the line is located within the boundaries of the urban district of Kaiserslautern and from Karlsthal to Schopp in the district of Kaiserslautern. Between Steinalben and Pirmasens Nord it runs through the district of Südwestpfalz, while the remainder of the line is located on the territory of the city of Pirmasens.

== Operations ==
=== Passenger services ===
In the first decades most passenger trains ran between Pirmasens and Biebermühle and some of them continued to Zweibrücken. After the opening of the Biebermühle–Waldfischbach section, the two parts were operated as separate sections. After the closing of the gap in 1913, there were seven continuous train pairs, one of which ran over the Donnersberg Railway (Donnersbergbahn) to Mainz and one via the Zeller Valley Railway (Zellertalbahn) to Darmstadt. In addition, there were trains running between Pirmasens and Waldfischbach and between Kaiserslautern and Schopp.

Improved performance in the 1930s led to two express train pairs on the Pirmasens–Kaiserslautern–Mainz route, one of them continuing to Frankfurt am Main. Express trains ran through to Darmstadt, Frankfurt and Wiesbaden in the 1960s. During the same period through coaches from Tübingen ran on the line. At the end of the 1990s, the excursion trains ended and from 1991 onwards there were no further through coaches. The last had been running to Dortmund since the end of the 1970s.

Since the beginning of the 1990s, the single-track Biebermühl Railway has been operated together with the Alsenz Valley Railway, the Kaiserslautern–Enkenbach railway and the Bingen–Bad Münster section of the Nahe Valley Railway under time table number 672. There were continuous connections between Bingen and Pirmasens from 1990 to 2008. The trains usually cross in Waldfischbach at the symmetry minute shortly before the full hour. The journeys between Pirmasens Hauptbahnhof and Kaiserslautern are designated by the Verkehrsverbund Rhein-Neckar as line R65 and those between the two Pirmasens stations are designated R55 (Landau–Pirmasens) and R68 (Saarbrücken–Pirmasens).

=== Freight traffic ===
The original Biebermühle–Pirmasens branch line was mainly used for freight traffic at first. Between Biebermühle and Kaiserslautern, the line was mainly used for the transport of timber. After the electrification of the Mannheim–Saarbrücken railway, freight traffic on the Biebermühl Railway quickly declined, as did freight traffic to Pirmasens. The service was carried out in the form of local freight trains from Einsiedlerhof marshalling yard. The gradient on the line south of Pirmasens Nord required the returning freight trains to brake shortly before leaving Pirmasens Hauptbahnhof. In addition, operations on the loading track in Steinalben required the blocking of traffic on the Schopp–Waldfischbach section.

In freight transport, which was discontinued in 2005, Pirmasens Nord station served as a distribution station for freight trains, which were divided into several individual trains. One served Pirmasens, another the railway stations between Kaiserslautern and Pirmasens Nord. In addition, from the 1970s, a train served the stations on the Hauenstein–Zweibrücken section of the Landau–Rohrbach railway from Pirmasens Nord.

== Rolling stock ==
=== Steam locomotives ===
The Kaiserslautern locomotive depot was primarily responsible for the steam locomotives, and later some of the locomotives were based at the Zweibrücken depot. The Palatine Railway operated tender locomotives with five coupled axles of the T 5 class, built by Fa. Krauss & Co., especially for use with the heavy freight trains on the steep climb to Pirmasens; these were designated by Deutsche Reichsbahn as class 94^{0}. Nevertheless, the latter decided to sell them in 1926 and thus before they were redesignated. Class T 1 locomotives originally operated between Biebermühle and Waldfischbach. The opening train between Kaiserslautern and Pirmasens on 1 August 1913 was hauled by Locomotive Rehweiler.

Subsequently, Prussian class T 14.1 tender locomotives were mainly used as substitutes on traffic between Biebermühle and Pirmasens. For a short time until 1946 they were replaced by class T 20 locomotives, reclassified as DRG Class 95, based in Zweibrücken; afterwards the latter locomotives were placed on the Geislinger Steige on the Fils Valley Railway. In 1939 they returned to handle the Pirmasens Nord–Pirmasens Hbf section as part of the Roten (red) Zone (the militarised zone near the French border). They were temporarily sent back to Geislingen after the invasion of France, but returned a year later until the end of the Second World War.

Otherwise Prussian and Palatine steam locomotives dominated freight traffic. Passenger services in the early years were mostly hauled by locomotives of classes Prussian P 8 and Prussian T 18 and later by classes 38 and 78. DRG Class 71.0 locomotives were also operated between Pirmasens Nord and Kaiserslautern. After the Second World War, locomotives of classes 50 and 86 were mainly used for freight traffic.

=== Diesel rolling stock ===
From the 1950s until about 1990, most passenger services on the Biebermühl Railway were operated with railbuses of classes VT 95 and VT 98. From 1990, passenger services were operated by new class 628 two-car diesel multiple units. They last ran between Pirmasens Nord and Kaiserslautern in 1981. Further south, they ran from Landau for another decade, before they disappeared there as well in 1993. Occasionally, battery electric multiple units of class 515 based in the Worms locomotive depot were also found on the Biebermühl Railway.

The steam locomotives were replaced from the 1960s by diesel locomotives of the classes V 100, V 60, 218 and V 200. The latter hauled services on the Pirmasens–Frankfurt route. From 1990, passenger services were operated by new class 628^{2} diesel multiple units. The line is now operated by class 643 (Bombardier Talent) or 642 (Siemens Desiro) diesel multiple units.

== Operating points ==
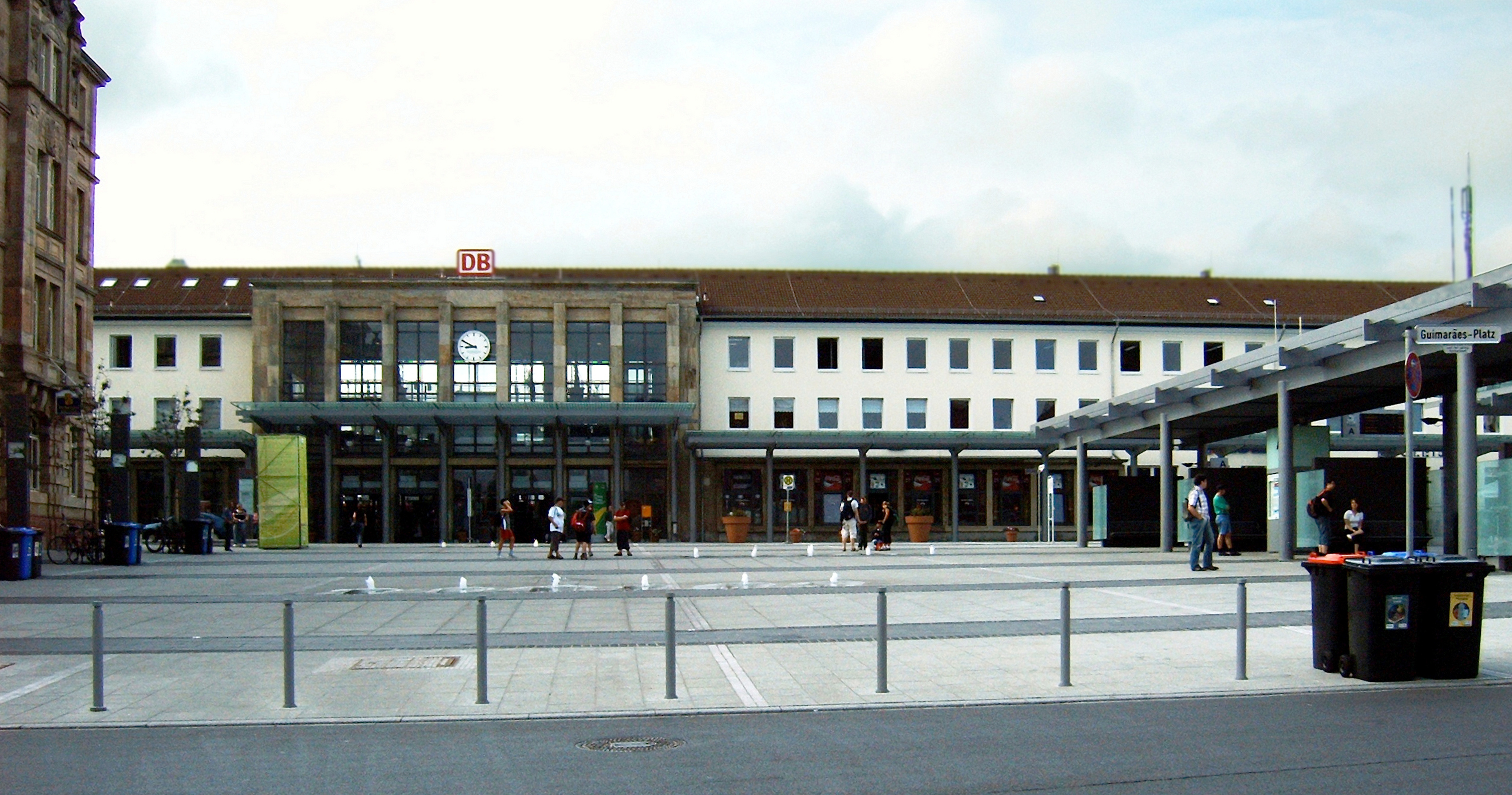
Kaiserslautern Hauptbahnhof

=== Kaiserslautern Hauptbahnhof ===
Kaiserslauten Hauptbahnhof was opened on 1 July 1848, with the Homburg–Kaiserslautern section of the Palatine Ludwig Railway (Pfälzische Ludwigsbahn). Not until half a year later was the line extended to Frankenstein, making the line from Rheinschanze to Bexbach operable throughout. In the succeeding decades this developed into the Mannheim–Saarbrücken railway. In spite of its importance, it did not become a railway junction until 1875 with the opening of the Kaiserslautern–Enkenbach railway, which served as a connection to the Alsenz Valley Railway and the Donnersberg Railway (Donnersbergbahn). It received a new entrance building in 1879. In addition, the station gained in importance with the opening of the Lauter Valley Railway in 1883 and the completion of the Biebermühl Railway in 1913. It has bicycle parking spaces, lockers, a shop with travel supplies, a DB Mobilitätsservice (support for the disabled), bus connections, barrier-free access and a DB information centre.

=== Kaiserslautern-Galgenschanze ===
The Haltepunkt (halt) of Kaiserslautern-Galgenschanze follows almost immediately after the branch from the Mannheim–Saarbrücken railway and serves the suburb of Galgenschanze on the eastern edge of Kaiserslautern. It was abandoned in the mid-1980s, but was re-activated a decade later.

=== Hohenecken ===
Hohenecken station served the Hohenecken district of Kaiserslauter and was located at the southern edge of the settlement. In addition, it had a crossing loop, which had since been dismantled. In the 1980s, it was abandoned due to lack of traffic. In June 2011, it was announced a new halt would be opened under the name of Kaiserslautern-Hohenecken.

=== Gelterswoog ===
The halt of Gelterswoog, in the area of Gelterswoog—still in the city of Kaiserslautern—was used exclusively for recreational traffic. It was opened on 28 August 1928. During the summer of 1950, it was reclassified as a halt. It was subsequently abandoned in 1977 due to low patronage.

=== Karlst(h)al ===
The halt of Karlsthal was situated in the municipality of Stelzenberg. Like the halt in Gelterswoog, it was primarily used for recreational traffic, in this case to the nature reserve in the nearby Karlstal, which is immediately adjacent to the east. It has also been abandoned, but tour groups can still use it on request.

=== Schopp ===
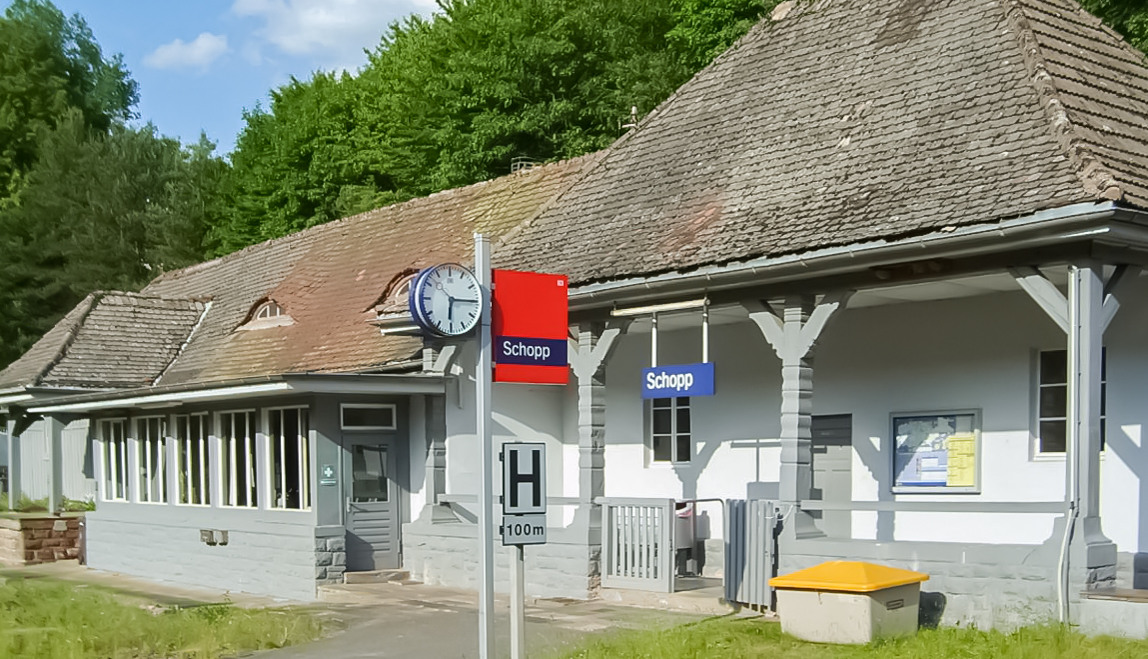
Schopp station

Schopp station is located on the north-western edge of the built-up area of the municipality of Schopp. At its opening, it had signals and a crossing loop. It is the only station between Kaiserslautern and Waldfischbach with a crossing loop.

Its entrance building, which was built in a traditional style with a hip roof and an open waiting area, dates back to around 1910 and is heritage listed. In the building itself is a mechanical signal box – officially abbreviated Sf – that was built to a unified design and was put into operation on 1 January 1954, replacing an external signal box. The former loading track in the station has been dismantled in the meantime.

=== Steinalben ===
The former station of Steinalben is located on the northern outskirts of Steinalben. It has since been reclassified as a halt. The district (Landkreis) of Südwestpfalz has decided to rebuild the halt in a central location. In addition, it is to be provided with a bus station and a commuter car park.

=== Waldfischbach ===
Waldfischbach station is located on the north-western edge of Waldfischbach. Like its counterpart in Schopp, it has a crossing loop and an entrance building. The latter, however, is no longer used for railway operations and has been owned by Heimbetriebsgesellschaft Pfalzblick since 1 September 2007.

It has a mechanical signal box (designated as Wf) that is still in operation; it was built in 1955 and is staffed by a train dispatcher.

=== Burgalben ===
The halt of Burgalben was abandoned in the 1980s because of low traffic volumes. There are attempts in the political domain to reactivate it.

=== Pirmasens Nord ===
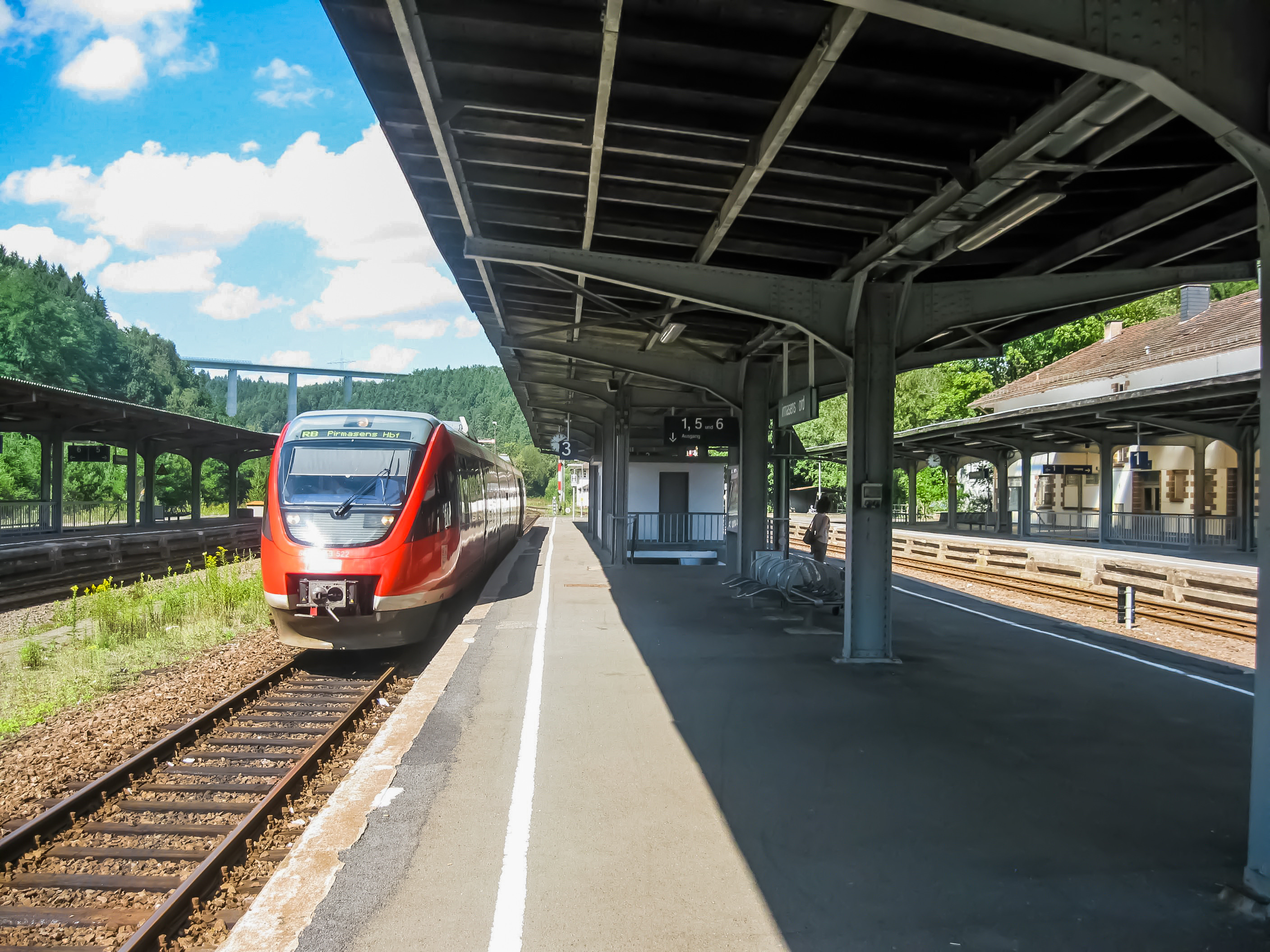
Trains in Pirmasens Nord station

Pirmasens Nord station, which is on the territory of the municipalities of Donsieders, Rodalben and Thaleischweiler-Fröschen, has always had the greatest importance of all the intermediate stations despite its peripheral location. This was mainly a result of the fact that a direct east–west link to the city of Pirmasens failed because of the difficult topographical conditions. For this reason, this station was erected a few kilometres north of Pirmasens at the junction with today's section of the Biermühl Railway to Pirmasens. It therefore acts mainly as a transfer station. The connection to Kaiserslautern was established from 1904 to 1913.

In the first decades of its existence, it was named Biebermühle after a village to its east in the municipality of Dorsieders. It is still commonly called Biebermühle. It was not until 1938 that it was given the name Pirmasens Nord, although it was never at any time in the territory of Pirmasens. It was modified in the 1930s for military reasons; the entrance building, which had been opened in 1904 with the opening of the Biebermühl Railway section to Waldfischbach on an island surrounded by rail tracks, was replaced by a new one on the eastern side of the tracks.

Over the last few decades, it has served as a distribution station for freight trains that ran from the Einsiedlerhof marshalling yard to Pirmasens Nord; they were broken up into several trains serving the stations between Hauenstein and Zweibrücken on the Landau–Rohrbach railway and those on the Biebermühl Railway.

=== Pirmasens Hauptbahnhof ===
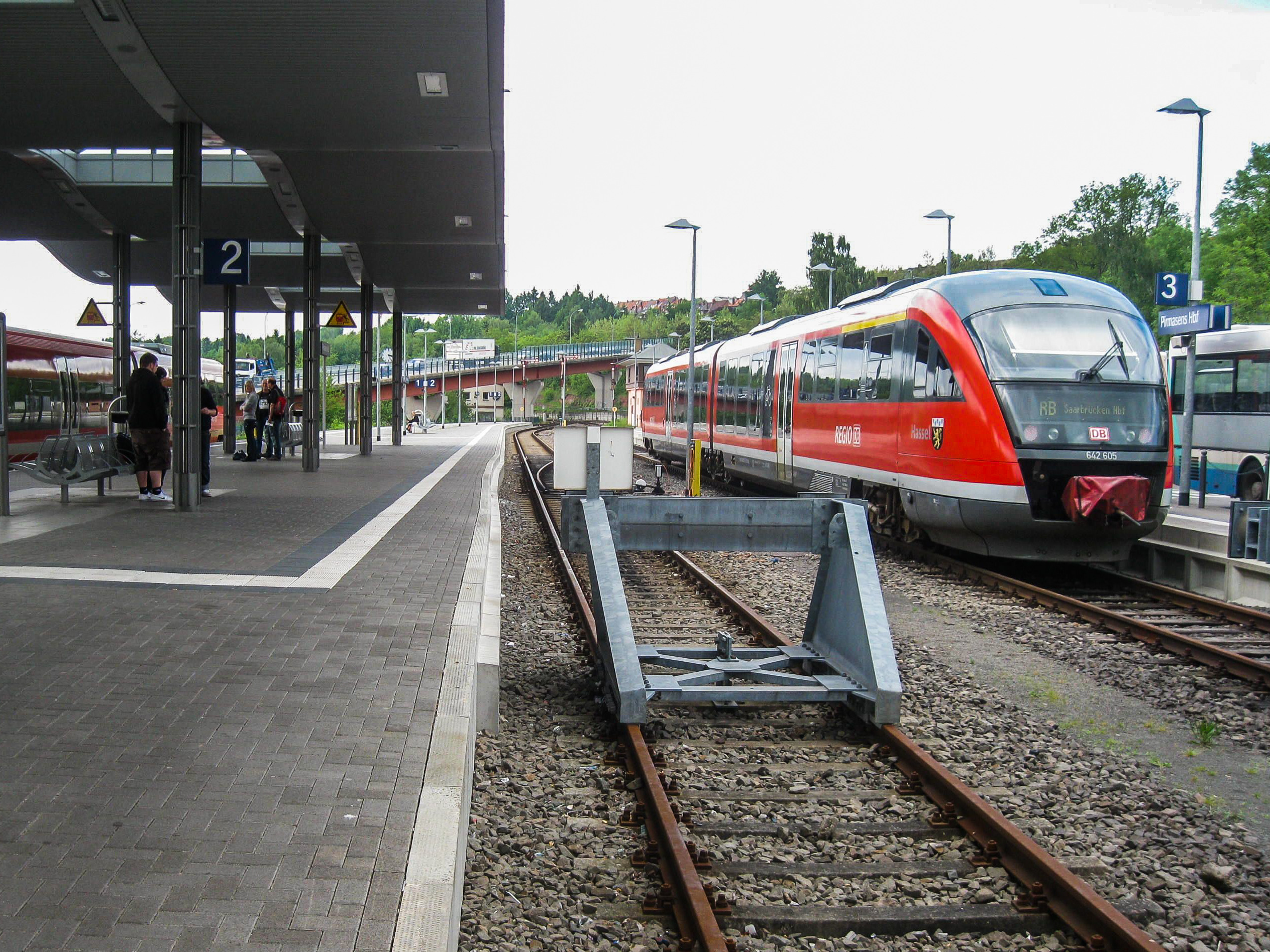
Pirmasens Hbf

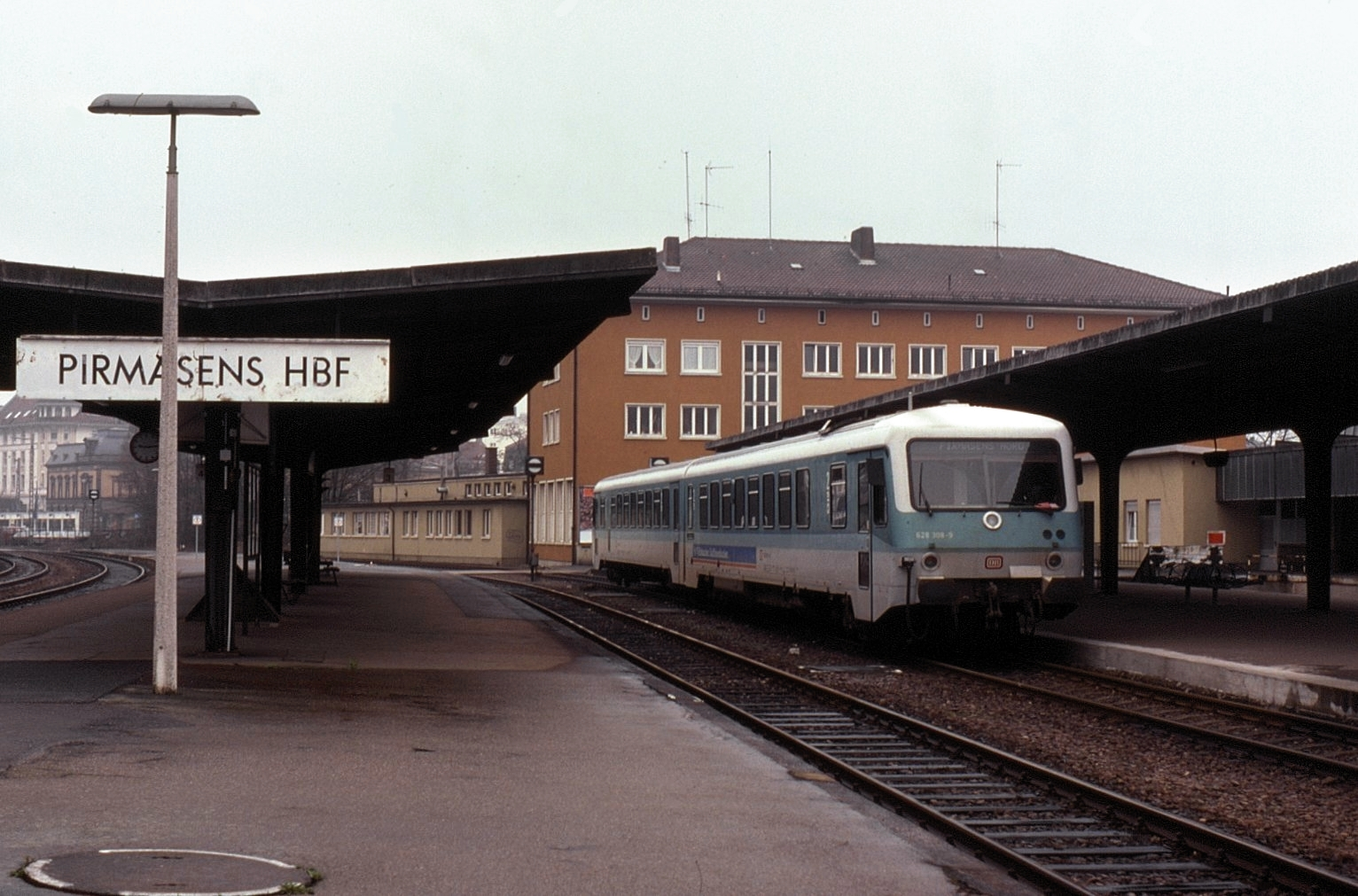
Pirmasens Hbf, 1993

Pirmasens Hauptbahnhof is located about one kilometre north of central Pirmasens. Despite its name, it has always been the only station in the town.

Around the turn of the century, the station was rebuilt as it was rundown. It received, among other things, a new entrance building.

Pirmasens station was officially renamed Pirmasens Hauptbahnhof (main station) from Pirmasens Bahnhof (station) in 1907. In April 1941, it also received a locomotive depot with a coal loading facility, which was administered as a branch of the Kaiserslauten locomotive depot.

Since it was badly damaged during the war, it was rebuilt from the 1950s onwards. Since the 1980s, its importance has steadily declined. Over this period, freight transport declined and was finally abandoned. The station was rebuilt around the turn of the millennium and the number of platforms was reduced to three. This work was officially completed on 22 November 2002.

== Accidents ==
In August 1980, due to the erosion of an embankment, diesel locomotive 218 384 derailed and crashed into the Moosalb near Schopp.
