= Schopp station =

Railway station in Schopp, Germany

Schopp
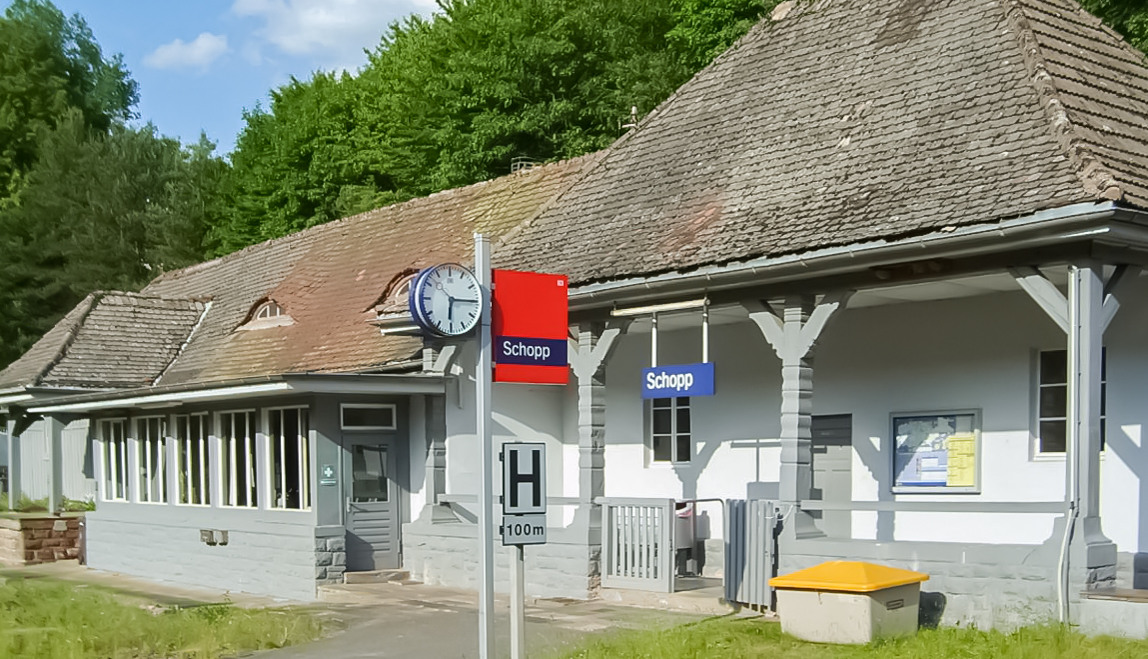
- Entrance building

General information
- Location: Bahnhofstr. 16, Schopp, Rhineland-Palatinate; Germany
- Coordinates: 49°21′33″N 7°41′15″E
- Lines: Biebermühl Railway (km 13.1) (KBS 672)
- Platforms: 2

Construction
- Accessible: Yes (low platform)
- Architectural style: Heimatstil

Other information
- Station code: 5680
- DS100 code: SSCP
- IBNR: 8005423
- Category: 6
- Fare zone: VRN: 824
- Website: www.bahnhof.de

History
- Opened: 1 August 1913
Location

Schopp station is a station in the village of Schopp in the German state of Rhineland-Palatinate. Deutsche Bahn classifies it as a category 6 station and it has two platform tracks. The station is located in the network of the Verkehrsverbund Rhein-Neckar (Rhine-Neckar transport association, VRN) and belongs to fare zone 824. Its address is Bahnhofstraße 16.

It was opened on 1 August 1913 as a transit station on the Biebermühl Railway between Kaiserslautern and Pirmasens, which was completed in the same year. The entrance building is under cultural heritage protection.

== Location ==
The station is located on the northwest edge of Schopp, in the bottom of the valley of the Moosalb. Next to the station, a farm road crosses a level crossing that is protected by a barrier that is actuated over an intercom. The Biebermühl Railway runs in this area in the north-south direction. Federal highway 270 runs approximately parallel to the railway line and separates the station from the rest of the built-up area.

== History ==
Already in 1838 and thus around a decade before the opening of the Palatine Ludwig Railway (Pfälzischen Ludwigsbahn), the first railway line within the Palatinate, the municipality of Schopp bought so-called Eisenbahnobligationen (railway bonds). Nevertheless, the village continued to lack a railway connection; the nearest station was located in Kaiserslautern, about ten kilometres away. In the middle of the 1860s, Schopp vehemently demanded a railway connection from Kaiserslautern to Pirmasens. The first plan from 1864 provided for a line via Vogelweh, Hohenecken, Schopp, Biebermühle and Rodalben.

In the following year, a committee, to which representatives from Kaiserslautern, Waldfischbach and Schopp belonged, noted several advantages of such a route. For example, the transport of timber from the areas of Johanniskreuz and Trippstadt would benefit from it.

In 1866, another draft plan followed, which was largely the same as today's route. For Bavaria, to which the Circle of the Rhine (Rheinkreis) belonged, the planned connection was not as important as a connection from Landau to Zweibrücken. The proposed connection between Kaiserslautern and Pirmasens was not considered by the Ministry of Trade to be useful because of the difficult topography and the thin settlement.

=== Planning, construction and opening (1870–1913) ===
The efforts to extend the Pirmasens line to Kaiserslautern, which was opened in 1875 at the same time as the line to Zweibrücken, did not end. As early as the 1860s, the district council of Waldfischbach had criticised the planned route of the Landau–Zweibrücken line. In 1872, the Palatine Railway received a request from the city of Kaiserslautern, which related to the planned connection to Pirmasens. Its director, Albert von Jäger replied that the organisation had to deal with so many projects that the line could not be built. Another, also unsuccessful request, was made in 1887.

In 1894, a plan was issued on behalf of the mayor's office of Kaiserslautern, with construction costs amounting to 4.4 million marks, of which about one third was for reconstruction of the stations of Kaiserslautern and Biebermühle. A year later this was forwarded to the government in Munich. Jakob von Lavale, the successor of Jäger who had died in the meantime, turned down the proposal. Thereupon a meeting took place in the Kaiserslauter Fruchthalle, which resulted in a protest against this position. This led to several proposals on how to progress the matter.

On 29 May 1900, the law was passed on "the development of railways of local importance in the Palatinate", which guaranteed railway construction. The opening of the Biebermühe–Waldfischbach section followed in 1904. The completion was delayed by the unfavourable topographical conditions. For instance, a gradient had to be overcome south of Schopp and the site of a powder mill located there avoided for safety reasons. The opening ceremony took place on 30 July 1913 and the line was opened for regular traffic two days later. At the time of its inauguration, Schopp station had signals and crossing loops.

=== Further development ===
In 1922, the station was integrated into the newly founded Reichsbahndirektion (Reichsbahn railway division) of Ludwigshafen. During the dissolution of the railway division of Ludwigshafen on 1 April 1937, it was transferred to the railway division of Saarbrücken.

After the Second World War, the Biebermühl Railway was broken during fighting between Steinalben and Waldfischbach, so that continuous operations were only possible again in 1946. At the same time, the station was integrated into railway division of Mainz, which was assigned all railway lines within the newly created state of Rhineland-Palatinate. In the course of the gradual dissolution of the railway division of Mainz from 1 August 1971, its counterpart in Saarbrücken took responsibility for the station.

After several closures in the 1970s, Schopp, along with Steinalben and Waldfischbach, was one of three remaining operating stations between Pirmasens Nord and Kaiserslautern Hbf. It and Waldfischbach were the two remaining crossing stations.

== Infrastructure ==
=== Entrance building ===
The entrance building is built with a hip roof in the Heimatstil (literally "home-style", related to the Swiss chalet style), with a waiting room with an open design. From the architectural point of view, it has similarities with its counterparts along the closed Bach Railway (Bachbahn) between Lampertsmühle-Otterbach and Reichenbach, which was also built in the 1910s. Even in the mid-1980s, it had a ticket office which was operated by the dispatcher. The ticket office was closed on 31 December 2002. The building was then sold to a local real estate agency. Subsequently, the monument protection agency inspected the entire area and classified the station building as a cultural monument.

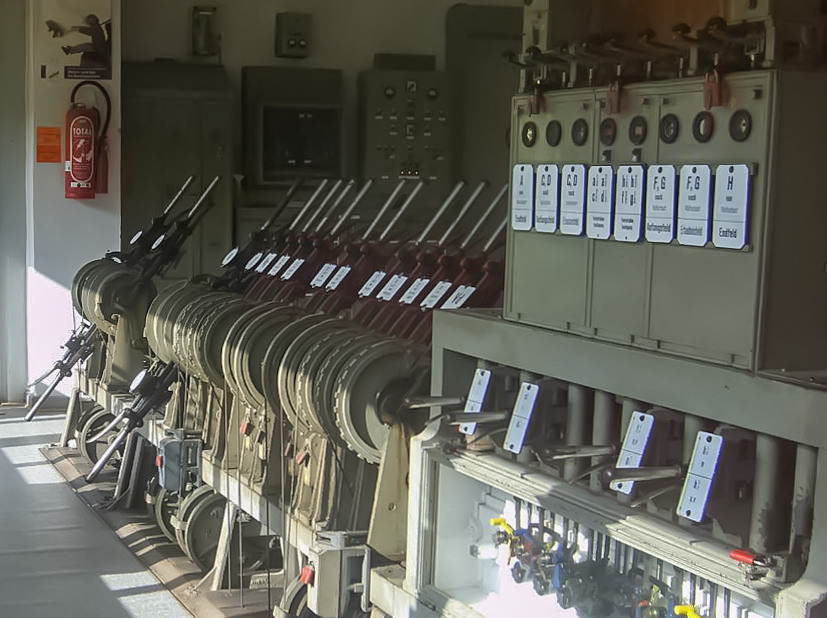
Signal box in the entrance building

There is a mechanical signal box– officially abbreviated Sf – in the building itself that was built in a unified style of construction and put into operation on 1 January 1954, replacing an external signal box.

=== Platforms ===
Platforms
Platform	Usable length	Platform height	Current use
1	163 m	20 cm	No normal use
2	163 m	20 cm	Regionalbahn services towards Kaiserslautern and Pirmasens

== Operations ==
=== Passenger services ===
In the first year of operation of the station, seven services a day ran from Kaiserslautern to Pirmasens and 18 services a day ran only between Kaiserslautern and Schopp. As the First World War broke out a year later, services were reduced significantly. In the 1970s, some trains stopped at all stations, while others only served larger stations such as Schopp. Some of these ran through to Mainz, Frankfurt and Würzburg. However, these connections were abandoned at the end of the 1980s.

=== Freight operations ===
The station had a great importance in freight operations for a long time. Thus, in 1934, it already had a diesel locomotive of the Kö I class. After the Second World War, a shunting locomotive from Pirmasens freight yard operated local goods trains (Nahgüterzug). In the 1980s, two local goods trains from Einsiedlerhof marshalling yard on the Mannheim–Saarbrücken railway served the station as well as Pirmasens and its surroundings. At the same time, local goods trains were also operated from Pirmasens Nord station, where a goods trains bound for the stations of Waldfischbach, Steinalben and Schopp was separated from the rest of the train. The former loading track in Schopp station was subsequently dismantled.

== Sources ==
=== References ===
- Generaldirektion Kulturelles Erbe Rheinland-Pfalz, ed. (2016). "Nachrichtliches Verzeichnis der Kulturdenkmäler Kreis Kaiserslautern" [List of cultural monuments of the Kaiserslautern district] (PDF; 1.4 MB) (in German). Koblenz.
- Engbarth, Fritz (2007). Von der Ludwigsbahn zum Integralen Taktfahrplan – 160 Jahre Eisenbahn in der Pfalz [From the Ludwig Railway to the Integral Timetable—160 years of Railways in the Palatinate] (in German).
- Engbarth, Fritz (2013). 100 Jahre Eisenbahnverbindung Pirmasens–Kaiserslautern [100 Years of the Pirmasens–Kaiserslautern Rail Link] (in German).
- Sturm, Heinz (2005). Die pfälzischen Eisenbahnen [The Palatine Railways] (in German). Ludwigshafen am Rhein: pro MESSAGE. ISBN 3-934845-26-6.
