= Amseldell =

Coordinates: 49°20′52″N 7°44′43″E

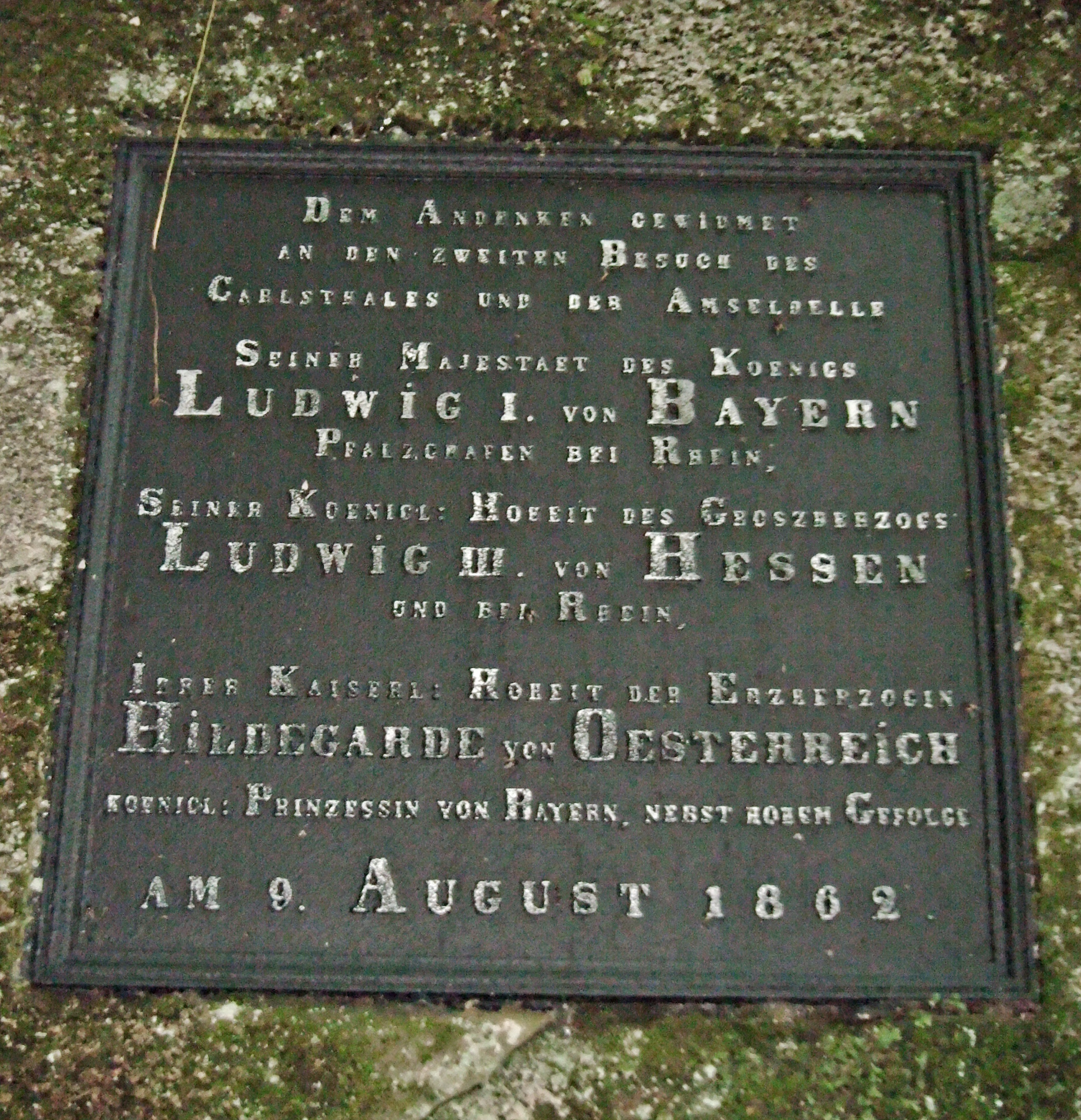
Karlstal Gedenktafel 1862 a

The Amseldell is a former park-like leisure area about two kilometres west of the German town of Trippstadt in the Palatine Forest in the state of Rhineland-Palatinate.

== Geographic location and environment ==
The Amseldell lies in field parcel (Gewann) of the same name in the middle of the forest, to the left of and above the near-natural valley of the Karlstal through which the Moosalb stream flows. The paths climbing from the valley are barely discernable today. One of them begins diagonally opposite the lower entrance to the Karlstal gorge.

This narrow track runs past a rock cave on the left-hand side. The rock, which acts as the roof of the cave, was sealed by a rough outer wall with door and window openings at the front. A woman, known locally as the "Rock Woman" (Felsenweib) lived here until 1843. This is one of the many cave dwellings that existed in the Palatinate region, the Alsace and the Harz Mountains (for example, in Langenstein) until about the middle of the 19th century.

A spur branches off one of the forest and cultural-historical footpaths and leads to the Amseldell. The path starts in the hamlet of Johanniskreuz and was waymarked in 1997 under the motto "track search" (Spurensuche). A flyer about the route, which is 21 km long and with orange and yellow waymarks, contains additional information about the Amseldell; the flyer is available in Trippstadt and Johanniskreuz.

== History ==
The name Amseldell means "Blackbird Hollow" and suggests it was a hollow where blackbirds could be seen. It probably relates, therefore, to a time when the blackbird was still a shy, woodland bird, i.e. before the 19th century.

The leisure park in the Amseldell was created in the 19th century under Lord (Freiherr) Carl von Gienanth (1818–1890), whose family managed an ironworks in Trippstadt and, from 1833, also owned Trippstadt House. Its aim was to enhance the walk through the Karlstal valley, which had already been landscaped in the 1780s by garden architect, Friedrich Ludwig Sckell. In 1890, after the death of Carl von Gienanth, his estate in Karlstal and Amseldell was donated to the Trippstadt tourist association, who looked after both sites until the 1930s. In May 1914, the Amseldell site was the venue for a regional gymnastics festival in which about 250 gymnasts took part.

== Today ==
The park was conceived as a site for various leisure pursuits. Today it is very run down and in need of significant restoration. Recognisable remains are a maze made of hedges, a firing range made of wood and stone, and a hut.

== Literature ==
- Wolfgang Dammbrück: Die letzte Bewohnerin der Felsenhöhle am Aufgang zur „Amseldell“, das „Felsenweib“ vom Trippstadter Karlstal. In: Blätter zur Heimatgeschichte von Trippstadt, 6 (1996), pp. 40–42
