= House of Sustainability =

Museum in Rhineland-Palatinate, Germany

Coordinates: 49°20′15″N 7°49′35″E

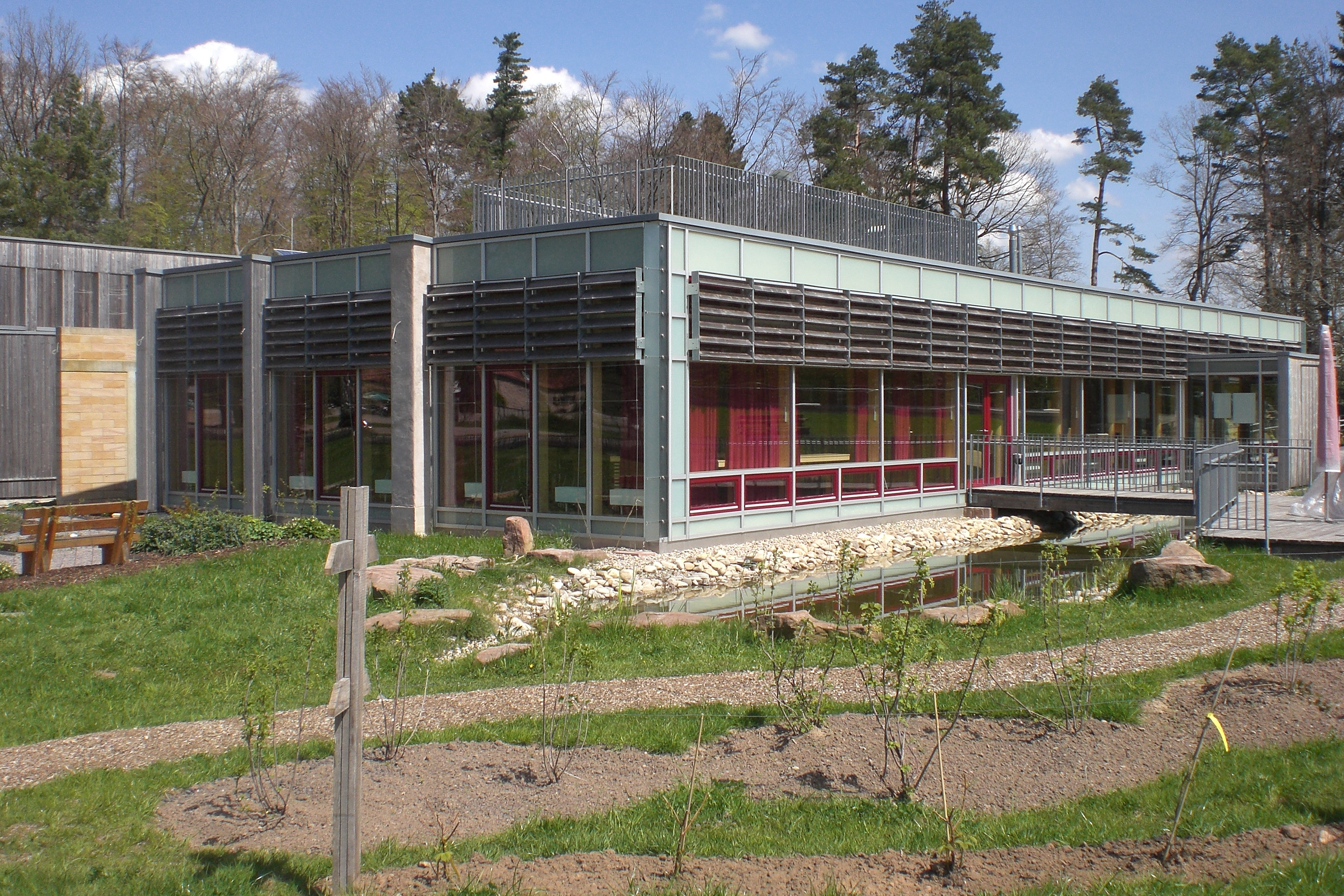
The House of Sustainability with its garden and footbridge over the pond

The House of Sustainability (German: Haus der Nachhaltigkeit) is a project run by the Rhineland-Palatinate Ministry for the Environment and Consumer Protection. The house is in the hamlet of Johanniskreuz in the German municipality of Trippstadt in the middle of the Palatinate Forest within the Palatine Forest-North Vosges Biosphere Reserve. The purpose of the house is to illustrate the concept of sustainability, especially to its adult visitors. The House of Sustainability is part of the Rhineland-Palatinate Efficiency Network (Effizienz-Netz Rheinland-Pfalz) or EffNet, which aims to deliver better resource efficiency.

== The house ==
The House of Sustainability is a modern house made of wood and clay, which serves as a model for sustainable living and building. Its power is supplied by a photo-voltaic system, its heating is produced by a wood pellet heating system. Its water supply is provided by rainwater. The nearby forest is part of the concept.

== Exhibition and events ==
The House of Sustainability has an exhibition which offers suggestions for environmentally friendly and healthy living and construction. It is the main exhibit. Since the house is located not far from the Franco-German border, the exhibition has information in both German and French. In addition, there are theme weeks, lectures and courses held around the subject of sustainability.
