= Trippstadt House =

Castle in Germany

Coordinates: 49°21′14.40″N 7°46′4.31″E

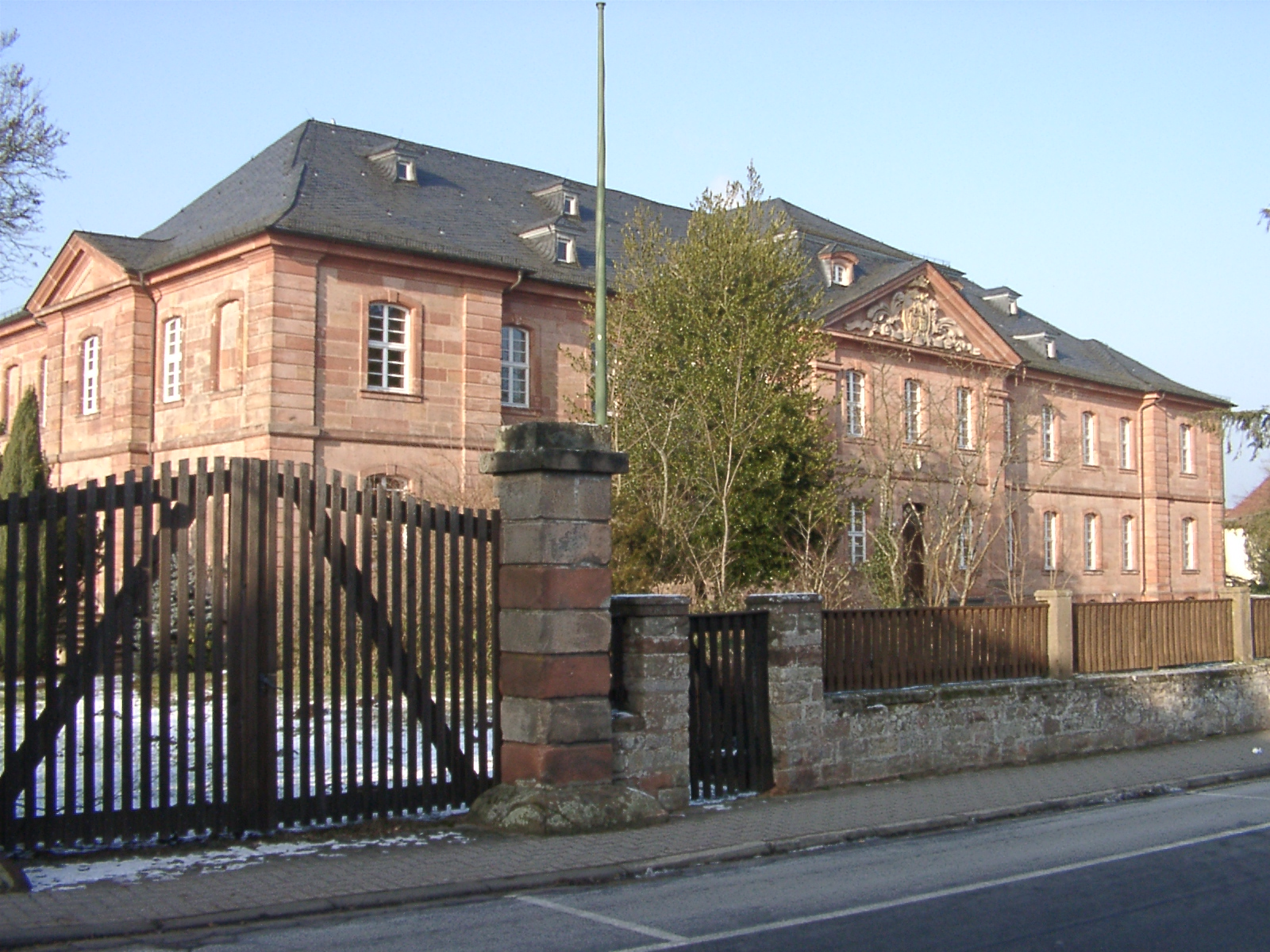
Trippstadt House

Trippstadt House (German: Trippstadter Schloss) is an 18th-century, baroque schloss or manor house in the eponymous village in the German state of Rhineland-Palatinate.

== Building ==
The building is made of red sandstone and comprises a single wing and is 48 metres long by 19 metres wide and 18 metres high. It has one basement and two storeys. Above the entrance is a relief of the coat of arms of the Hacke and Sturmfeder alliance.

The gable above the front entrance shows a relief, the date 1766 and the names or the arms of alliance of its first owners, Franz Karl Joseph von Hacke (son of Ludwig Anton von Hacke) and Amöna Marie Charlotte Juliane Sturmfeder von Oppenweiler, who was a daughter of local Dirmstein nobleman, Marsilius Franz Sturmfeder von Oppenweiler.

In 1767, an underground water supply was built at the Quellbachhübel, northeast of the residential buildings. It consisted of a spring chamber, in which the water from various springs collected, and three accessible galleries into which the water was directed downwards at a slight gradient to the castle well or to two other wells in the residential area. The latter two, the "Upper Well" and the "Deer Well", were destroyed after 1965, the tunnel to the castle well, which has been preserved over a length of 300 m, is now called the "Well Tunnel" and is one of the cultural monuments of the municipality.

== History ==
The house was built in 1767 by the architect, Sigmund Jacob Haeckher, and called Maison de la Campagne ("Country House"). Its owner was Franz Karl Freiherr von Hacke and his wife, Amönia Freiin von Sturmfeder. He was the master hunter (Obristjägermeister) of Electoral Palatine, responsible for hunting in the 55 km^{2} Barony of Wilenstein. The first lightning conductor in the Palatinate was installed at the house on 17 April 1776 by physicist, Johann Jakob Hemmer, from Mannheim. Its French garden was planned and executed around 1780 by landscape architect, Friedrich Ludwig von Sckell, who was also responsible for its natural extension, the attractive valley of Karlstal through which the Moosalb stream flows.

French Revolutionary troops partly destroyed the house on 13 July 1794, leaving only the cellars inhabitable. The house went into Alsatian possession in 1803. The entire manorial estate of Trippstadt, including the house, was sold in 1833 by Reichsrat, Ludwig von Gienanth.

In 1865, the Freiherr von Gienanth sold the house to the Kingdom of Bavaria. They established a state forestry office there in 1885 and, in 1888, rebuilt the ruined part of the house. A forestry school was opened in the house. In 1915, during the First World War, the school had to be closed. Not until 1946, after the Second World War, was it re-opened as a school of forestry for the Palatinate.

The house was home to the Rhineland-Palatinate State School of Forestry from 1960 to 1980. In 1985, the municipality of Trippstadt took over the management of the gardens and turned them into a recreation area. In 1987, the house became the home of the Forest Research Institute of the state of Rhineland-Palatinate.

== Literature ==
- Günter Stein: Burgen und Schlösser in der Pfalz. Frankfurt/Main 1976
