= Karlstal =

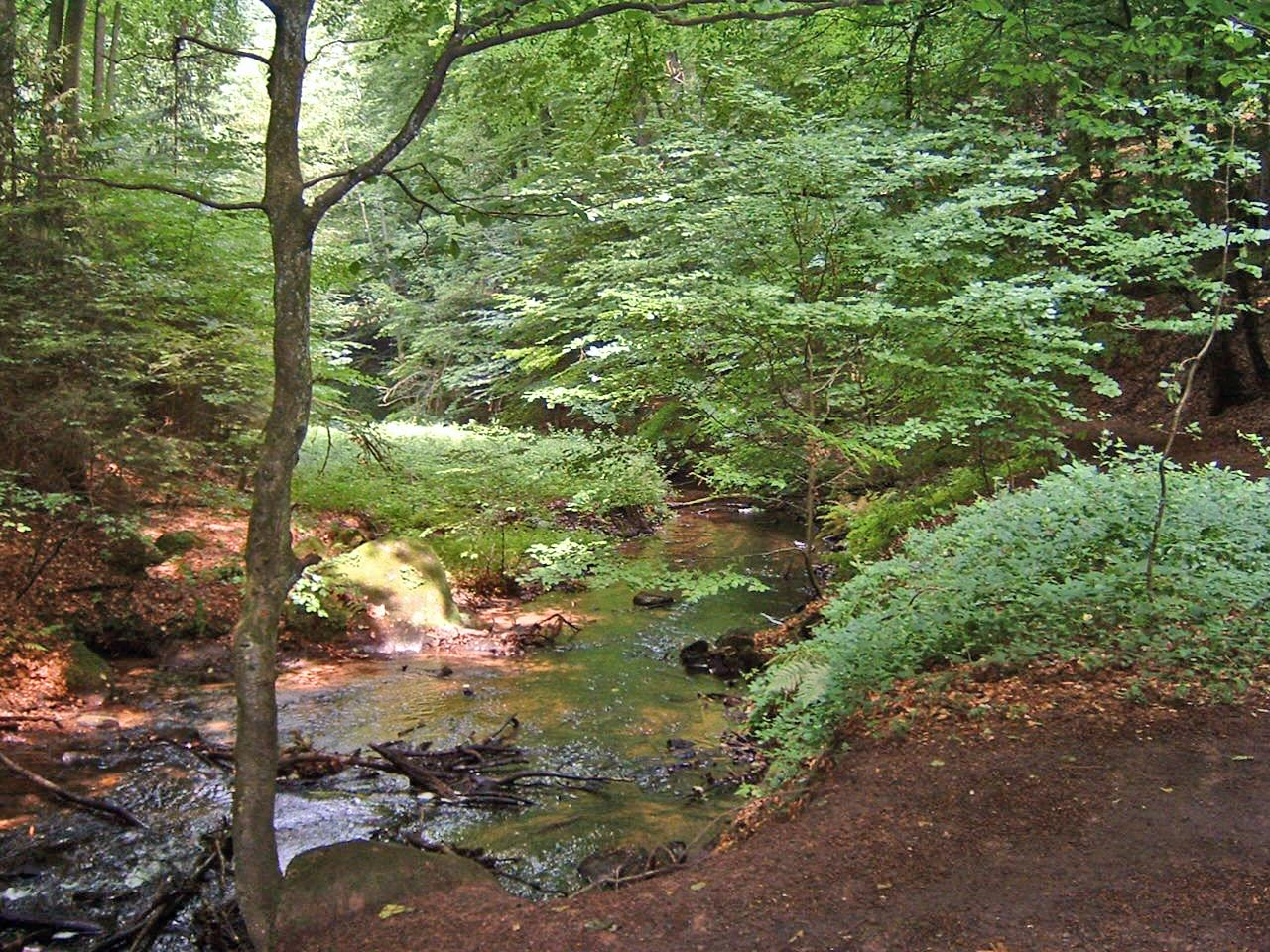
- Area: Palatine Forest (Palatine Holzland)

Geography
- Location: Rhineland-Palatinate, Germany
- Coordinates: 49°20′59″N 7°45′27″E
- Rivers: Moosalb
- Interactive map of Karlstal

The Karlstal is the valley of the Moosalb stream located near Trippstadt in the Palatine Forest in the German state of Rhineland-Palatinate. It is registered as a nature reserve - number 335 055 - under the name of Karlstalschlucht ("Karlstal Gorge").

== Location ==
The Karlstal lies about 10 kilometres south of the German city of Kaiserslautern near the climatic spa of Trippstadt. There is a footpath running through the Karlstal Gorge, a ravine which is roughly 3 kilometres long.

== History ==
Friedrich Ludwig von Sckell, who laid out the first landscape garden in Germany, was involved in the conversion and extension of the gardens of Trippstadt House in the 1780s. Whilst there, he got to know the nearby Karlstal and described it thus:

One of the most beautiful valleys of this type that I have seen ..., lying in the Barony of Trippstadt ..., then known as the Karlstal.

— Friedrich Ludwig von Sckell

Subsequently, Sckell undertook alterations over the central part of the gorge, a good kilometre long, and dovetailed a trail with little wooden bridges and a wooden pavilion into the valley, so that its near-natural impression was even more heightened.

An iron table at the entrance to the valley refers to a royal visit: Ex-king Ludwig I of Bavaria, Grand Duke Louis III of Hesse-Darmstadt and Archduchess Hildegard of Austria, together with their retinue, visited the valley on 9 August 1862.

== Landscape ==
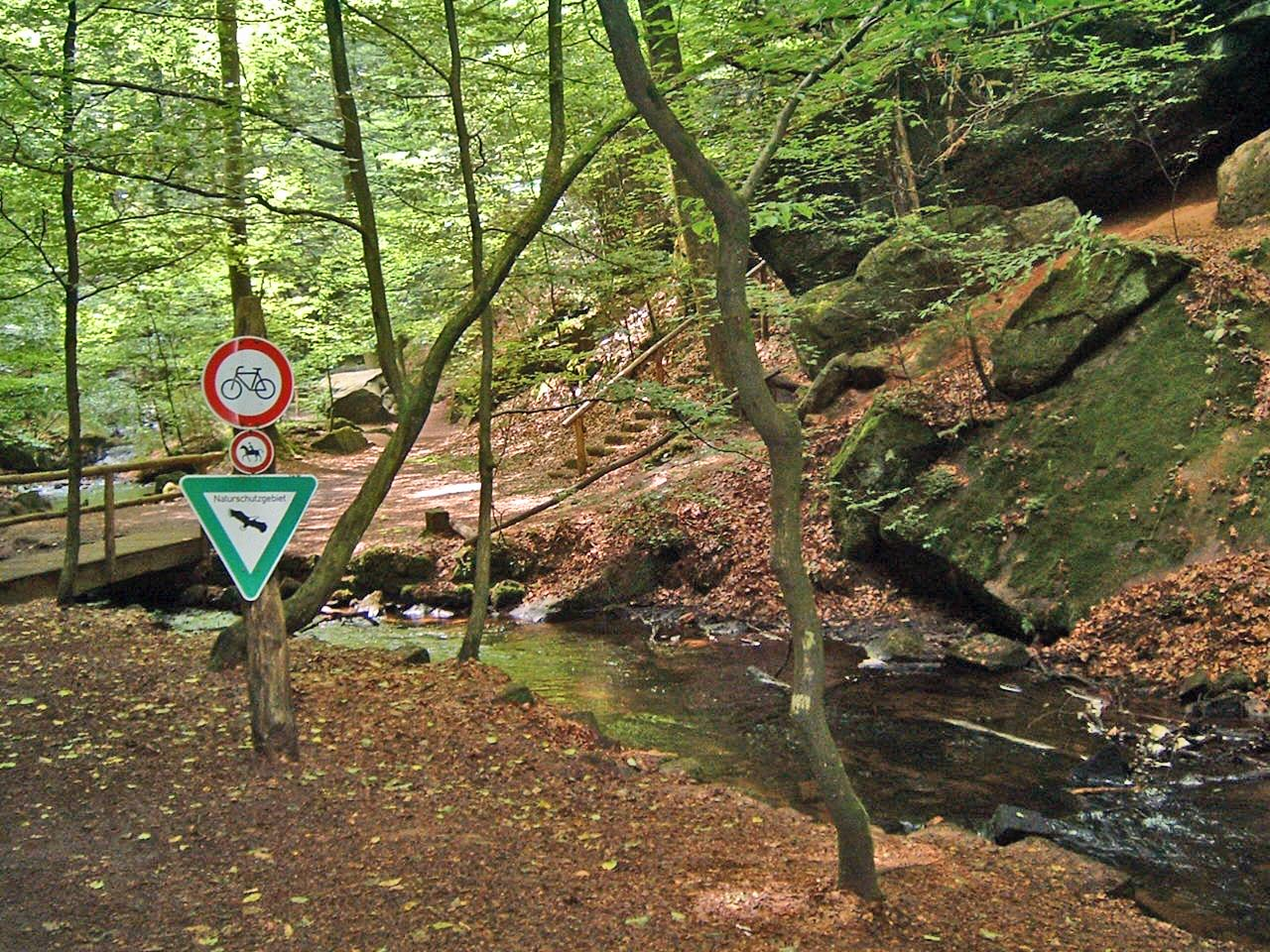
The Karlstal

The rocky gorge, through which the Moosalb flows and which is largely natural, contains a large amount of rock debris from the red bunter sandstone of the region, as well as numerous little waterfalls and old deciduous and conifer stands. As a result, it is one of those destinations in the Palatine Forest that is promoted by those responsible for tourism.

On the left-hand side of the Karlstal valley, is a formerly occupied rock cave which is only accessible on an almost unmetalled path. Above it, on level ground is the Amseldell, an old park-like area from the 19th century that has since been left to decay, but which originally had a maze, a firing range and a hut.

Other sights in the surrounding area are described in the article on the Moosalb.

== Transport ==
At its western end along the Biebermühl Railway, there was once a halt called Karlsthal, which through lack of profitability was closed. Since its closure the nearest station has been Schopp.

== Literature ==
- Wolfgang Dammbrück (1996), "Die letzte Bewohnerin der Felsenhöhle am Aufgang zur "Amseldell", das "Felsenweib" vom Trippstadter Karlstal", Blätter zur Heimatgeschichte von Trippstadt (in German), vol. 6, pp. 40–42
