= Johanniskreuz =

- Ortsteil of Trippstadt
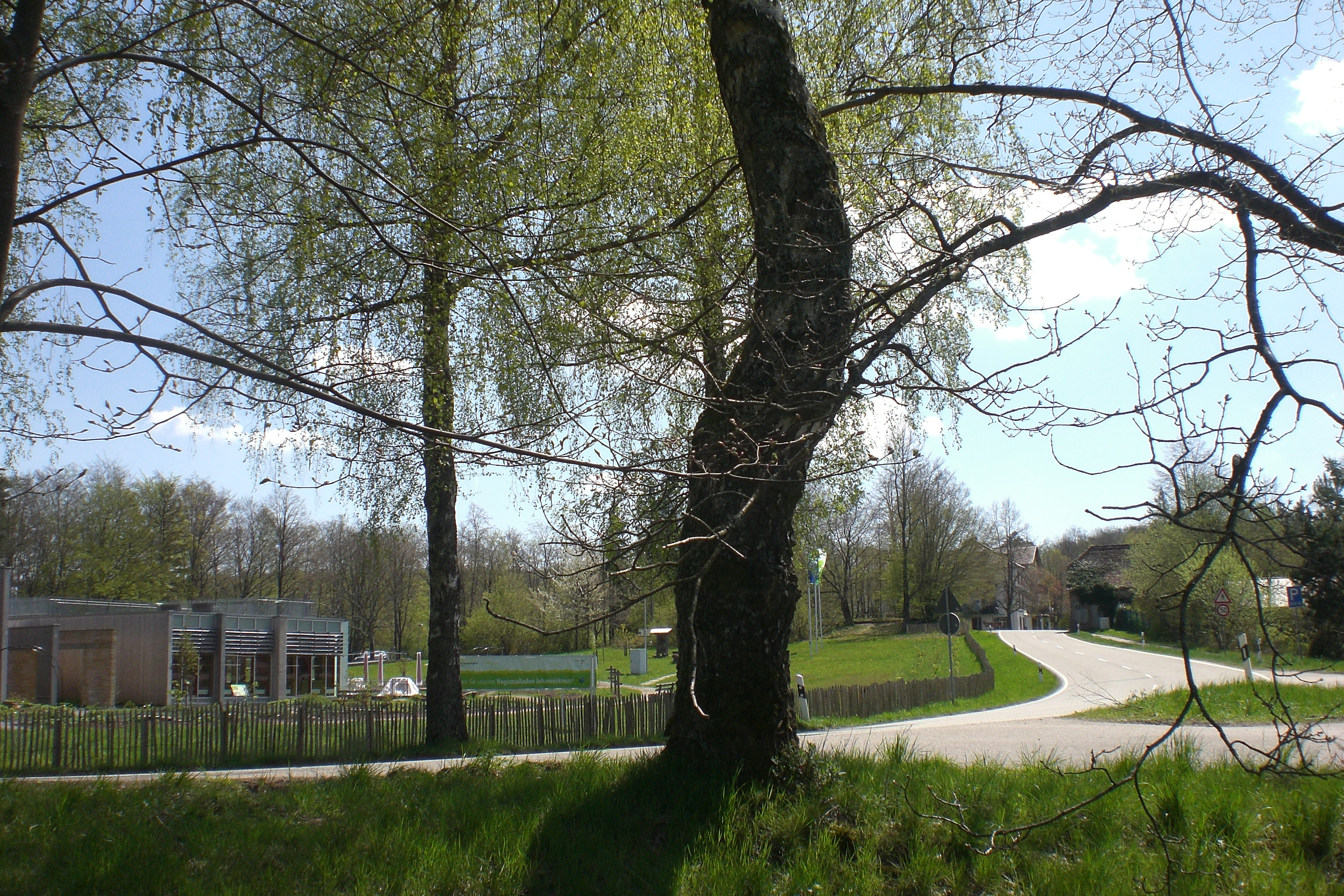
- The B 48 near Johanniskreuz
- Interactive map of Johanniskreuz
- Location within Germany Location within Rhineland-Palatinate
- Coordinates: 49°20′13″N 7°49′32″E
- Country: Germany
- State: Rhineland-Palatinate
- District: Kaiserslautern
- Municipality: Trippstadt
- Elevation: 470 m (1,540 ft)

Population (2006)
  - Total: 14
- Time zone: UTC+01:00 (CET)
  - Summer (DST): UTC+02:00 (CEST)
- Postal codes: 67705
- Dialling codes: 06306

Johanniskreuz is a tiny hamlet in the middle of the Palatine Forest in Germany and belongs to the municipality of Trippstadt in the district of Kaiserslautern in the state of Rhineland-Palatinate.

== Geography ==
=== Location ===
Johanniskreuz lies in a saddle at about 470 metres (1,540 ft), north of the midpoint of the central massif of the Palatine Forest, the Frankenweide, whose surrounding peaks are only a little higher. The Frankenweide, across which the Palatine Watershed runs, is bounded to the west, north and east in the area of Johanniskreuz by the valleys of streams that rise near the hamlet. Immediately west of Johanniskreuz is the source of the Moosalb, a tributary of the Schwarzbach, which itself rises one kilometre southwest of Johanniskreuz. The waters of these streams initially flow westwards through the Blies and Saar rivers into the river Moselle and then on to the Rhine. A little to the east of Johanniskreuz is the source of another Schwarzbach, this time the left-hand headstream of the Speyerbach; which flows eastwards, directly to the Rhine.

The municipal centre of Trippstadt is about 4.5 kilometres away as the crow flies. The municipal boundary between Trippstadt and Elmstein, as well as the county boundary between Kaiserslautern and Bad Dürkheim, runs immediately east of the hamlet.

=== Climate ===
The annual precipitation in Johanniskreuz is 1,005 mm and thus lies in the upper quadrant of values within Germany. The driest month is September; the most precipitation falls in December, i.e. 1.6-times as much as in September.

== History ==
=== Name ===
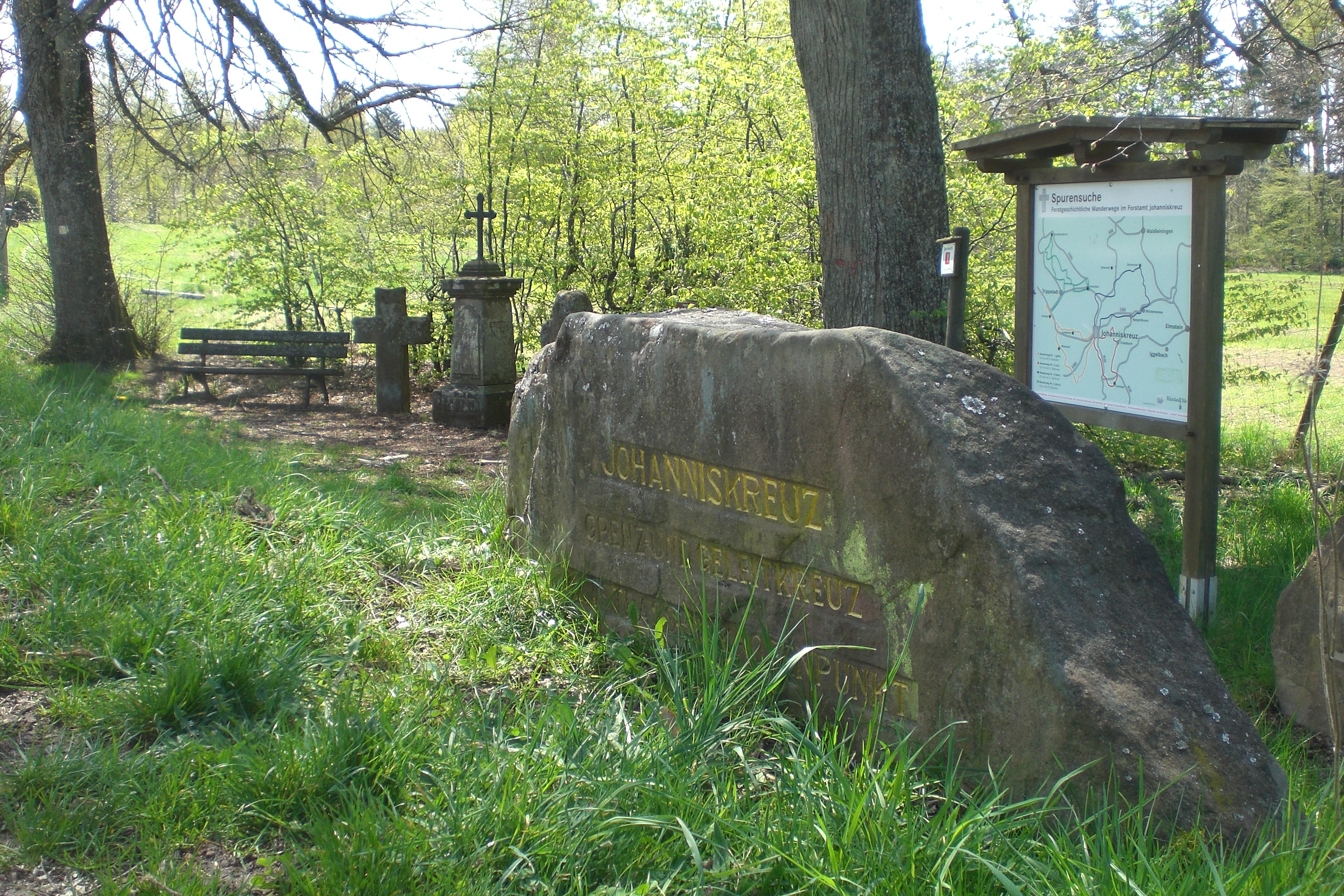
In the foreground is a so-called Ritterstein. Behind: the stone crosses

The name of the parish may go back to Johannes von Wilenstein. He was a liege lord (German: Lehnsherr) at the nearby castle and, in 1269, he had his coat of arms inscribed as a boundary marker – apparently illegally – on an existing wayside cross (Flurkreuz) which belonged to the lords of Hohenecken. Lord John's Cross (Herrn Johanns Creutz) is first mentioned in the records in 1551. Only remnants of the oldest cross have survived; two crosses of more recent date were placed beside it. Since the district reform of 1972 Johanniskreuz has belonged entirely to the municipality of Trippstadt; before that several of the houses, based on the historic boundaries, were in the parish of Wilgartswiesen.

=== Palatine Forest ===
At a meeting of Palatine forest officials in Johanniskreuz in August 1843 the name Pfälzerwald ("Palatine Forest") was given to the northern part of the Vosges mountains. In a way Johanniskreuz is thus the "birthplace" of the Palatine Forest which, until the early 20th century was counted as part of the Vosges or Wasgenwald in most travel literature.

=== Roman Catholic Convention ===
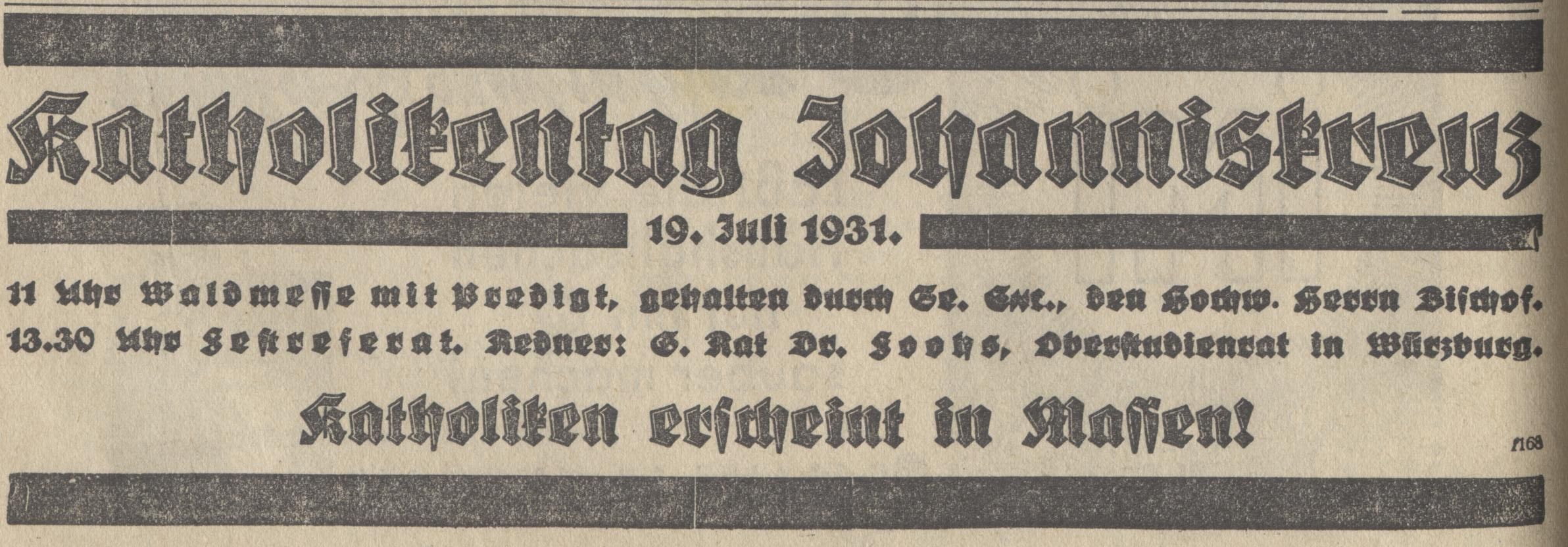
Advertisement for the Catholic Convention at Johanniskreuz in 1931 with Anton Fooß as the keynote speaker

Johanniskreuz is part of the Roman Catholic parish of Trippstadt. In 1908, after the theology graduate, Anton Fooß, had taken over the benefice there in 1906, he initiated the first Speyer Diocesan Catholic Convention (Speyerer Diözesan-Katholikentag) in Johanniskreuz. This Catholic Convention was a firm tradition in the Diocese of Speyer and took place annually at the venue selected by Fooß in Johanniskreuz until 2007.

Many well known bishops, churchmen, politicians and otherwise notable Roman Catholics since 1908 went to the annual convention in Johanniskreuz as guests, celebrants, preachers or speakers. On 19 July 1931, Anton Fooß, now living in Würzburg as an initiator, joined the event again as its keynote speaker. He gave a speech on the 40th anniversary of the death of Ludwig Windthorst entitled "Windthorst and Our Time". It was to be the last of these conventions before the Second World War. In 1932 it was cancelled because on the same day Reich Chancellor Heinrich Brüning was speaking at a major event of the Centre Party in Ludwigshafen. From 1933, during the Nazi era, these diocesan conventions could no longer take place. Only after the Second World War was the tradition revived.

In 2007 it came to light that most of the old deciduous and pine trees at the woodland venue were in danger of falling. Because no funding is available to carry our safety work, the Roman Catholic Convention is no longer held in Johanniskreuz.

== Economy and infrastructure ==
=== Transport ===
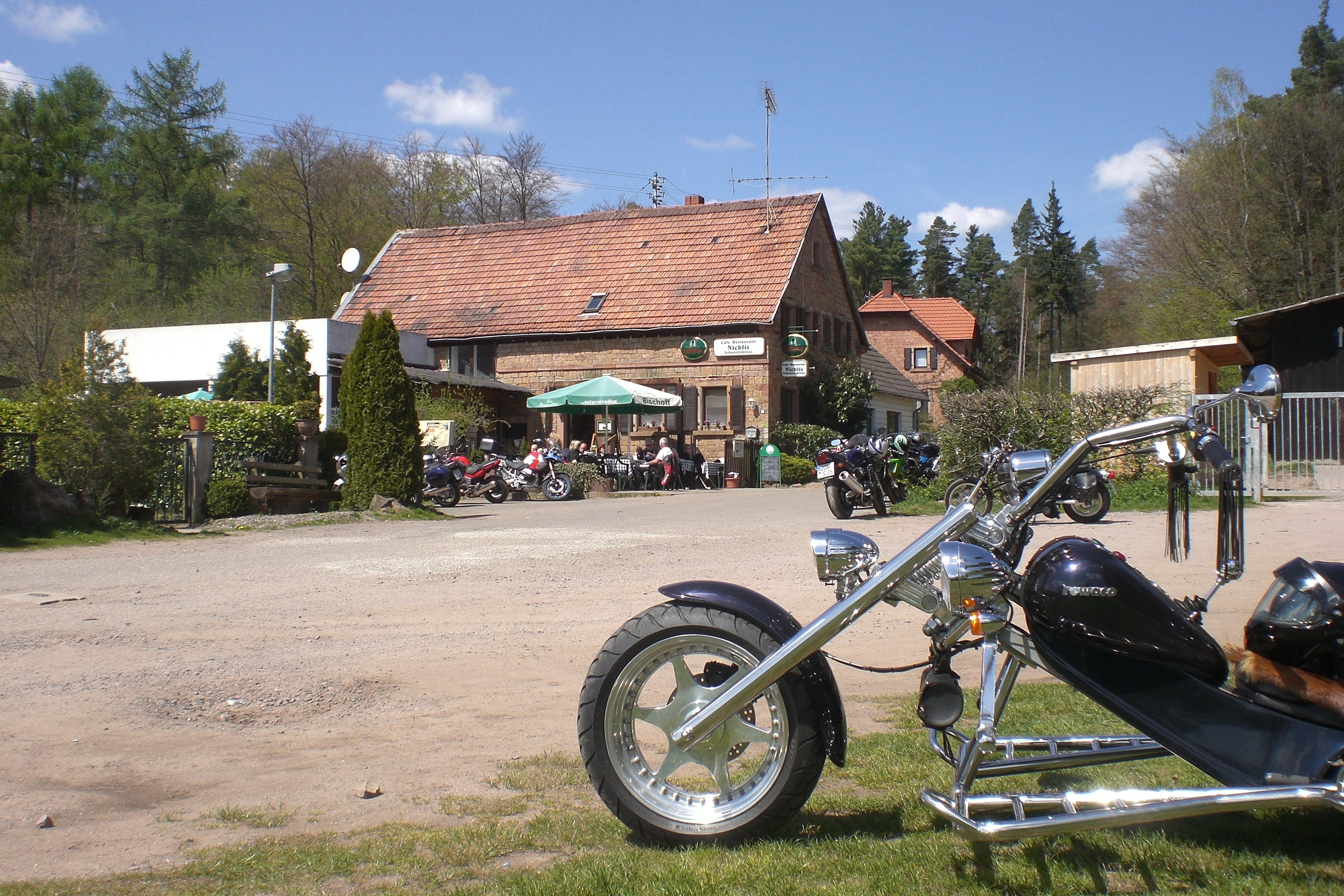
Summertime biker's gathering in Johanniskreuz

Johanniskreuz has always been a central communication hub in the Palatine Forest. Whilst the most important historic link from Speyer to Metz ran from east to west and the area around Johanniskreuz was also part of the northern route of the Palatine St. James' Ways, today the main transport axis is the B 48 federal highway from Annweiler to Hochspeyer which runs from north to south. From the Queich valley to Hochspeyer, Johanniskreuz is the only settlement on this very route, which is very winding especially in the north. Also important from a transport perspective is the equally winding state road through the Elmstein Valley towards Neustadt an der Weinstraße. Other road links in a western direction through the Karlstal to Trippstadt and southwest – Heltersberg, Waldfischbach-Burgalben – in places follow paths that were used in the Middle Ages.

As the hub of several scenic routes Johanniskreuz has become a meeting place for motorcyclists. However, the road through the Elmsteiner Tal is closed to motorcycles at weekends during the summer months due to the high number of accidents.

The nearest railway stations are Schopp on the Biebermühl Railway and Elmstein on the Cuckoo Railway (Kuckucksbähnel).

=== Tourism ===
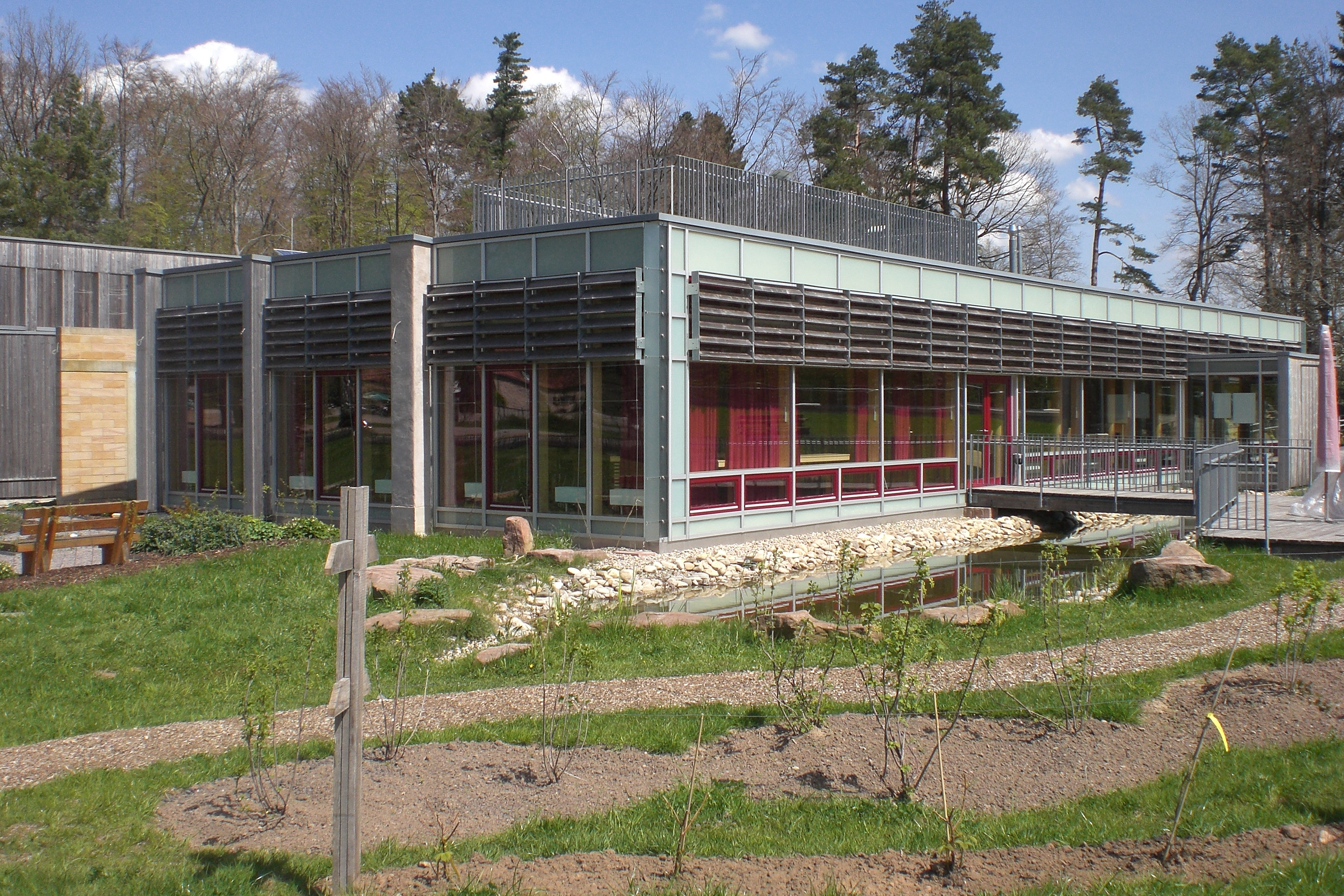
The House of Sustainability

Since the first attempts at developing tourism in the Palatine Forest in the 19th century, Johanniskreuz has been a top destination for visitors to the region. Spa houses (Kurhäuser) were established early on that, today, function as hotels. In 2004 the House of Sustainability (Haus der Nachhaltigkeit) opened, with permanent exhibitions about sustainable economics and future energy concepts as its main attraction. The latest tourist facility is the Palatine Forest Mountain Bike Park (Mountainbikepark Pfälzerwald), for which 5 routes, together over 300 kilometres long, have been marked out. Johanniskreuz is also the intersection of all footpaths marked with a cross by the Palatine Forest Club.

== Literature ==
- Hubert Zintl (2006), Johanniskreuz. Im Herzen des Pfälzerwaldes : Eine Forst- und Waldgeschichte (in German), Mainz: Ministerium für Umwelt, Forsten und Verbraucherschutz Rheinland-Pfalz/Landesforsten Rheinland-Pfalz, ISBN 3-00-019005-8
