= Schopp =

- Municipality
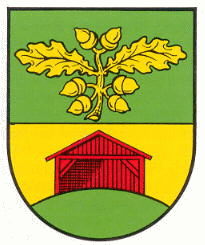
- Coat of arms

- Location of Schopp within Kaiserslautern district
- Interactive map of Schopp
- Location within Germany Location within Rhineland-Palatinate
- Coordinates: 49°21′09″N 7°41′22″E
- Country: Germany
- State: Rhineland-Palatinate
- District: Kaiserslautern

Government
  - Mayor (2019–24): Benjamin Busch (CDU)

Area
  - Total: 11.35 km^{2} (4.38 sq mi)
- Elevation: 220 m (720 ft)

Population (2025-12-31)
  - Total: 1,505
  - Density: 132.6/km^{2} (343.4/sq mi)
- Time zone: UTC+01:00 (CET)
  - Summer (DST): UTC+02:00 (CEST)
- Postal codes: 67707
- Dialling codes: 06307
- Vehicle registration: KL
- Website: www.kaiserslautern-sued.de

Schopp (German pronunciation: [ʃɔp]) is a municipality in the district of Kaiserslautern, in Rhineland-Palatinate, western Germany. Schopp station lies on the Biebermühl Railway.

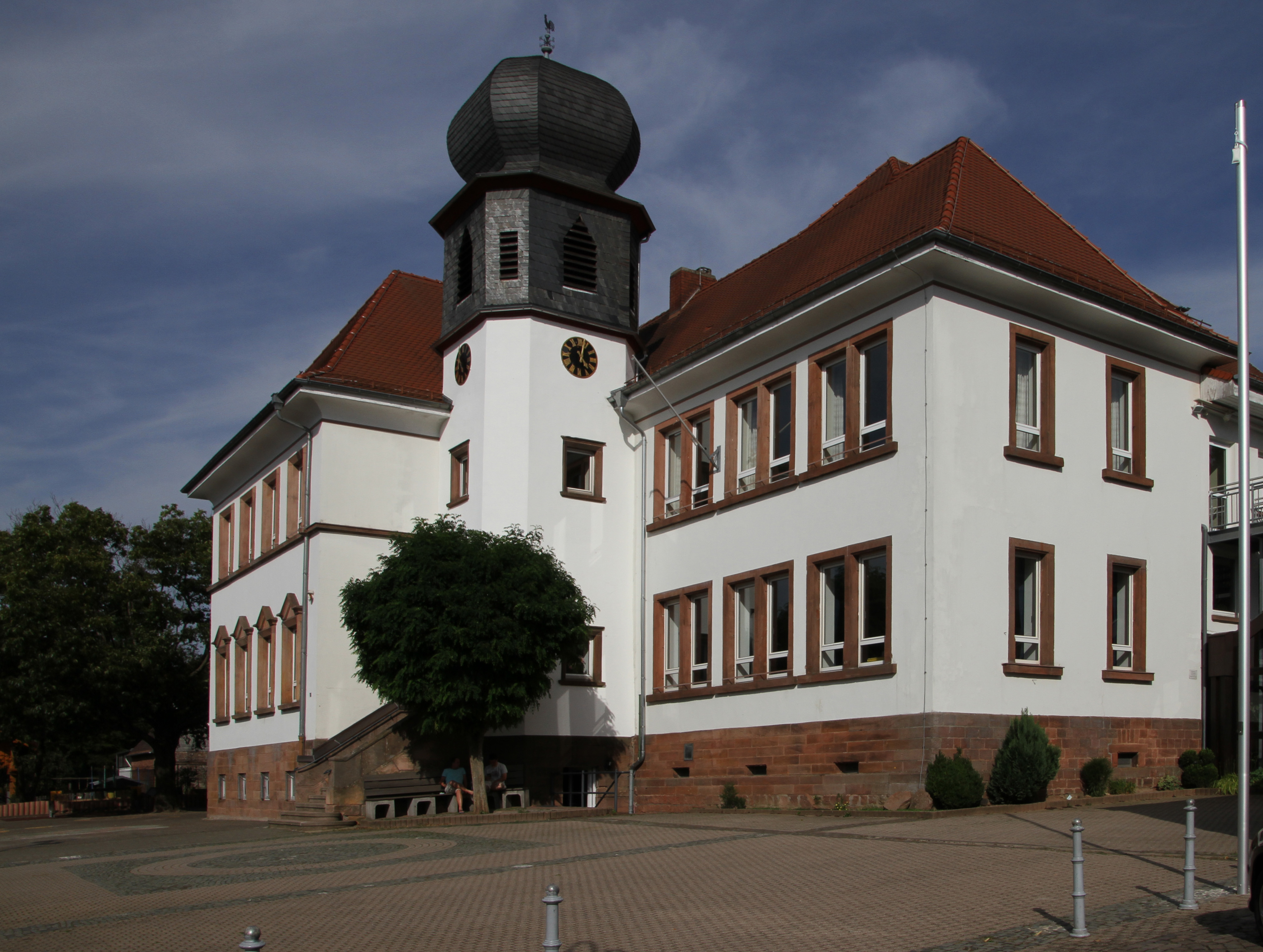
School in Schopp

== History ==
The place was first mentioned in documents in 1345. In the Middle Ages Schopp, together with Waldfischbach, Geiselberg, Schmalenberg and Heltersberg, was under the cloister Hornbach. With the secularization of the monastery in 1557, the places came to the Electorate of Palatinate.

From 1798 to 1814, when the Palatinate was part of the French Republic (until 1804) and then part of the Napoleonic Empire, Schopp was incorporated into the canton Waldfischbach in the department of Donnersberg and was under the Mairie Waldfischbach. In 1815, the place was first added to Austria. A year later, the community moved to the Kingdom of Bavaria and was there part of the Rhine Circle. From 1818 to 1862 the town was part of the Landkommissariat Pirmasens, which was subsequently converted into a district office.

1939 Schopp was incorporated into the district of Pirmasens. After the Second World War, the community within the French occupation zone became part of the then newly formed state Rhineland-Palatinate. In the course of the first Rhineland-Palatinate administrative reform Schopp moved in 1969 in the district of Kaiserslautern. Three years later, the town was incorporated into the newly created collective municipality Kaiserslautern-Süd, which was merged into Landstuhl in July 2019.

== Population ==
=== Population Growth ===
The development of the population of Schopp, the values from 1871 to 1987 are based on censuses:

Year	Population	Year	Population
1815	140	1961	1.113
1835	211	1970	1.318
1871	379	1987	1.381
1905	495	1997	1.530
1939	758	2005	1.513
1950	892	2017	1.482

=== Religion ===
In 1828 the village had 186 Protestant and 19 Catholic inhabitants. At the end of 2014, 47.9 percent of the population was Protestant and 28.0 percent Catholic. The rest (24,1 %) belonged to another religion or were non-denominational. Currently, August 2020, 42,8 % of the population is Protestant and 26,6 % Catholic. The rest (30,6 %) belonged to another religion or were non-denominational. The Catholics belong to the Roman Catholic Diocese of Speyer, the Protestants to the Evangelical Church of the Palatinate.
