= Moosalb (Schwarzbach) =

River in Germany

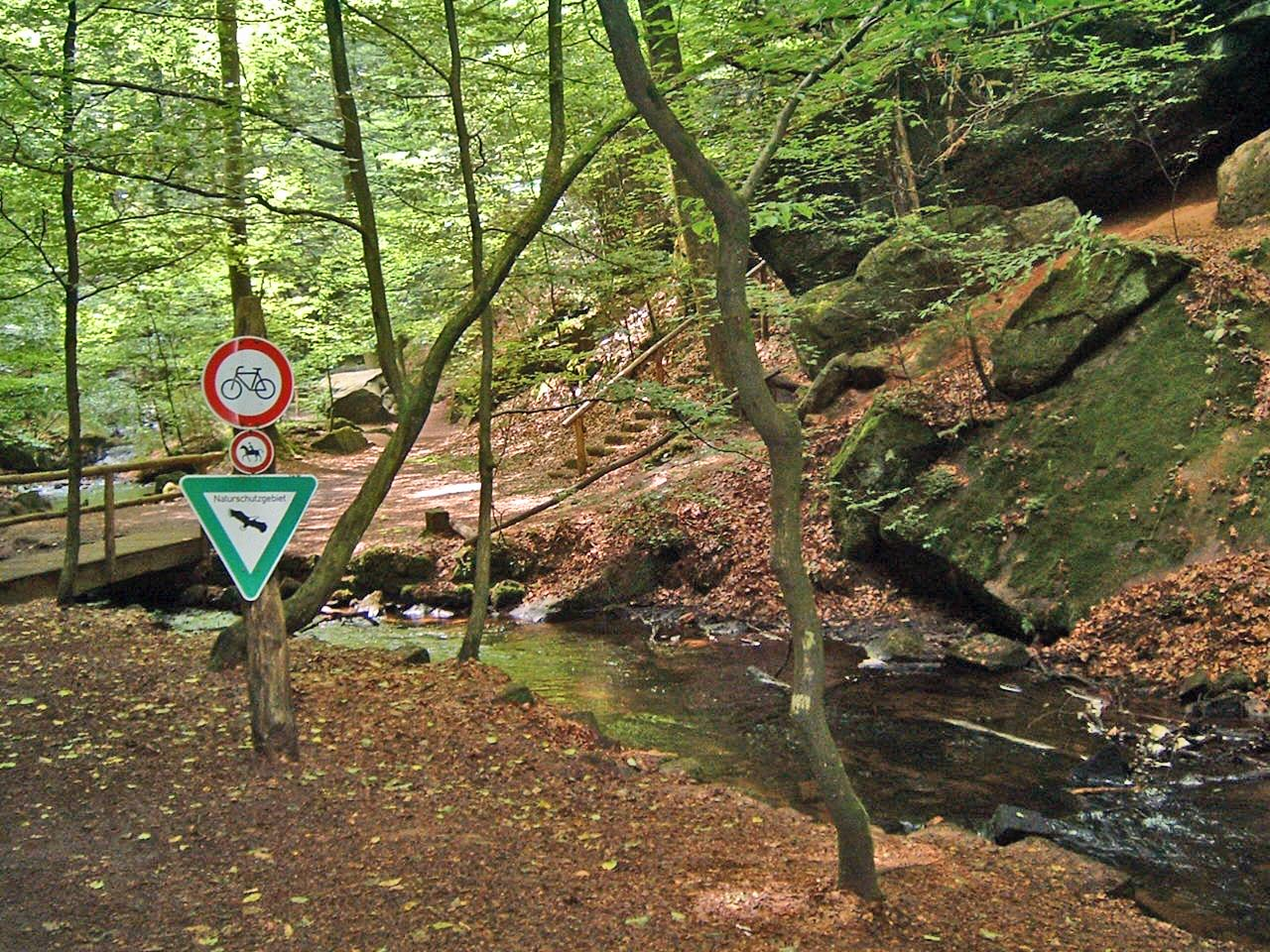
- The Moosalb in the Karlstal valley

Location
- Country: Germany
- State: Rhineland-Palatinate
- Region: Palatine Forest
- Reference no.: DE: 264262

Physical characteristics
- Source
  - location: Near Trippstadt
  - coordinates: 49°20′04″N 7°49′05″E
  - elevation: 410 m above sea level (NN)
- Mouth
  - location: Near Waldfischbach-Burgalben into the Schwarzbach
  - coordinates: 49°16′45″N 7°38′50″E
  - elevation: 248 m above sea level (NN)
- Length: 25.82 km, with the Aschbach 30.3 km
- Basin size: 188.174 km^{2}

Basin features
- Progression: Schwarzbach→ Blies→ Saar→ Moselle→ Rhine→ North Sea
- Tributaries
  - right: Aschbach, Kottelbach, Krickenbach, Queidersbach

The Moosalb (also Moosalbe) is a stream in West Palatinate in the German state of Rhineland-Palatinate. The upper Moosalb valley is also called the Hammertal ("hammer mill valley") on account of the many witnesses, in the form of ruined buildings and structures, to the iron smelting and working industries of the 18th and 19th centuries.

== Course and tributaries ==
The Moosalb rises in the heart of the Palatine Forest west of the Palatine Watershed at a height of about 450 metres. East of its source lies the village of Johanniskreuz which belongs to Trippstadt. Initially the Moosalb flows roughly westwards before heading south. After just under 26 km it empties into the Schwarzbach, also known here as the Burgalbe, at Waldfischbach-Burgalben.

The biggest tributary of the Moosalb is the 15.8 km long Aschbach, which – like the Moosalb comes from the Palatine Forest. It joins from the right at Karlstal station and delivers more than half as much water again as the Moosalb. At Steinalben it is joined from the right by the Queidersbach, whose source lies on the Sickingen Heights.

== Sights ==
Karlstal – upstream of the confluence of the Moosabl with the Aschbach is the valley of Karlstal, a largely natural and rocky narrow valley, about 4 kilometres long.

Amseldell – on the left-hand side of the Karlstal lies a formerly occupied rock cave and far above the Amseldell, a ruined site from the 19th century that formerly had a labyrinth, a firing range and a hut.

Klug’sche Mühle – The mill of Klug’sche Mühle on the Moosalb, near the lower end of the Karlstal, was converted to a restaurant after being restored. Before it transferred to the ownership of the Klug family in 1842, whose descendants still run it today, it was called the Wilensteiner Mühle.

Unterhammer – The site of Unterhammer was a former iron hammer mill and now a monument to early industrial history in the Palatinate.

Wilenstein Castle – On the right and above the Karlstal valley lie the ruins of Wilenstein Castle at a height of 400 metres. it was built in the mid-12th century. The present day Wilenstein Castle Youth Hostel (Jugendheim Burg Wilenstein) is home to a rural educational home (Schullandheim), school and youth groups.

Trippstadt Church – The baroque church in Trippstadt was built in 1744/45 on the foundations of its Gothic predecessor.

Trippstadt House – Trippstadt House (Trippstadter Schloss), designed in the baroque style from bunter sandstone from the region, was built from 1764 to 1767 to plans and under the direction of Zweibrücken architect, Sigmund Jacob Haeckher. The associated park (Schlosspark) was originally laid out along strict geometric lines in the Versailles style and was considerably larger than it is today.

Brunnenstollen – The Trippstadt Brunnenstollen ("spring tunnel") was completed in 1767. The structure, built by driving the tunnel simultaneously from both ends, as in classical antiquity, provided the municipality with drinking water until 1965. The Brunnenstollen is a unique structure monument within Europe.

Iron Smelting Museum – The Trippstadt Iron Smelting Museum (Eisenhüttenmuseum Trippstadt) documents the boom time of the iron smelting industry, which the village experienced around the middle of the 19th century.

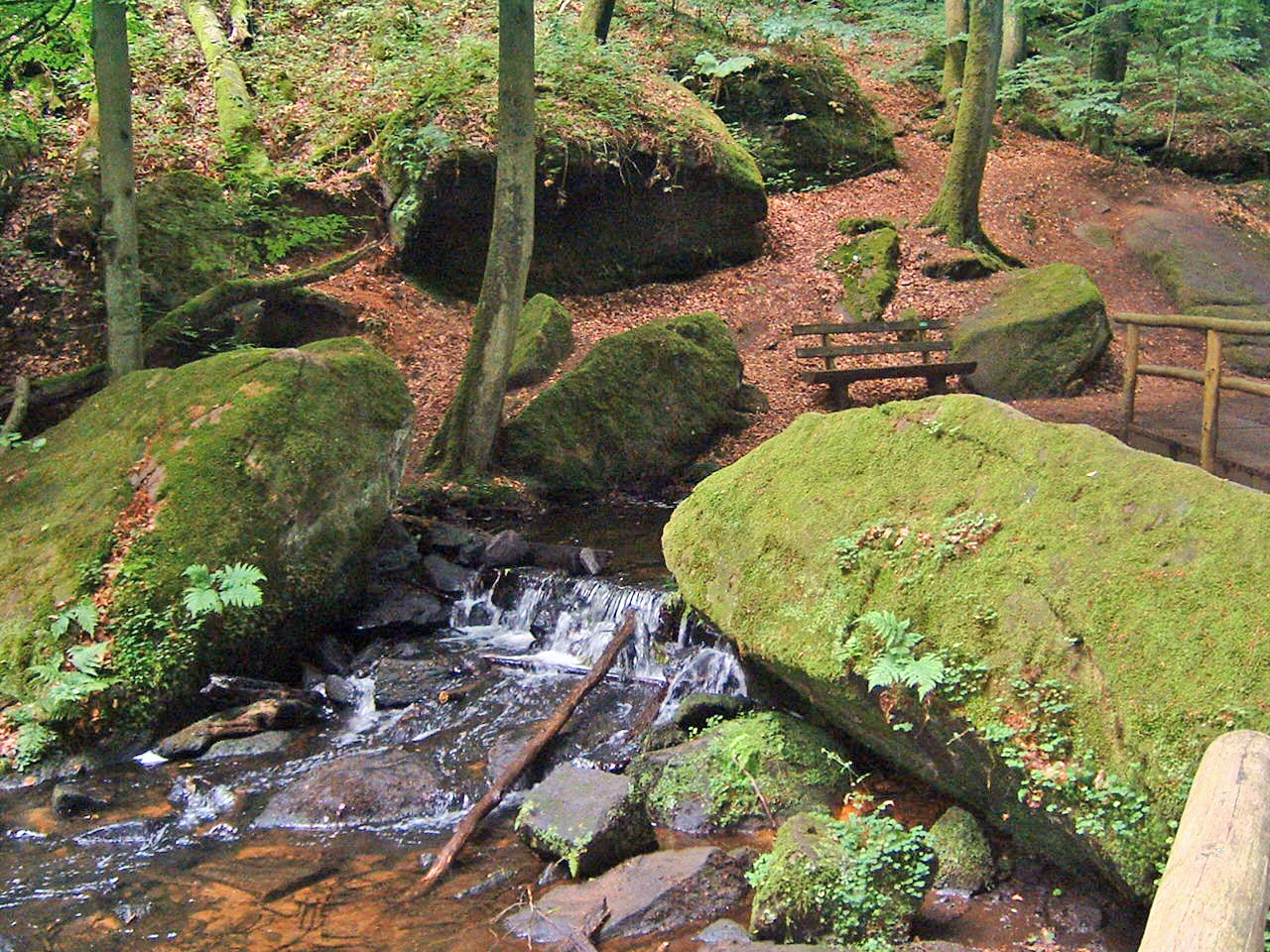
The Karlstal valley

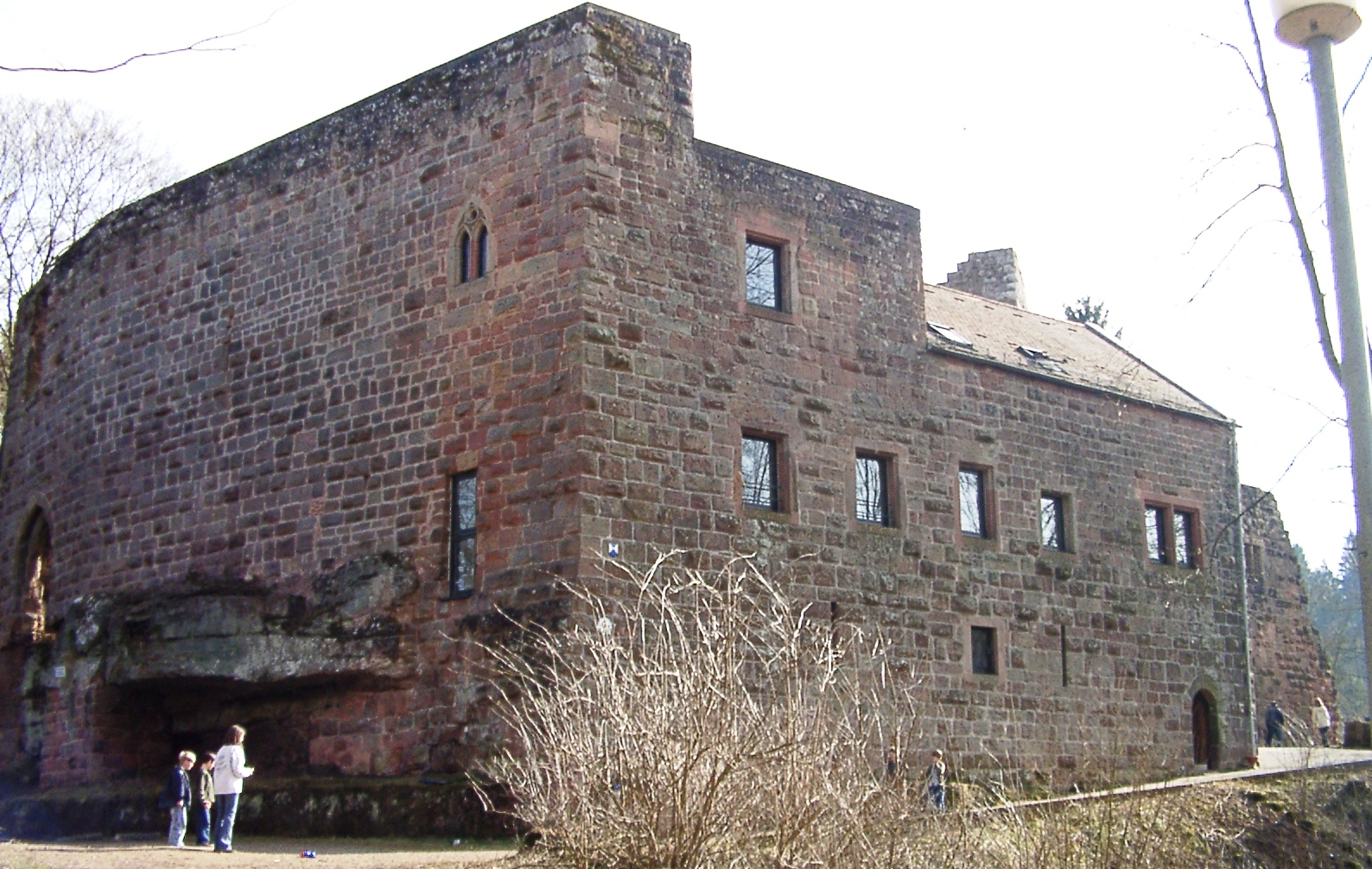
Wilenstein Castle

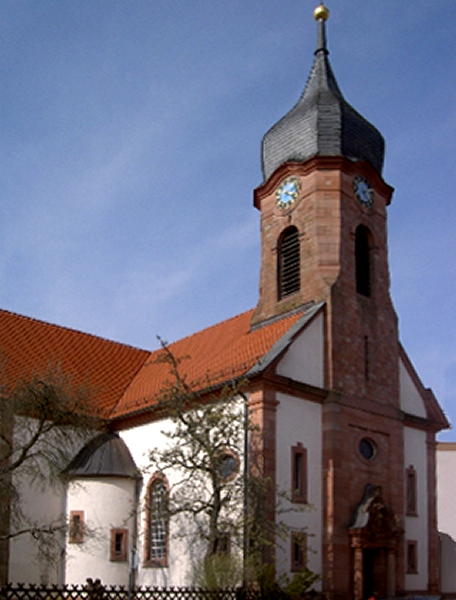
The baroque church of Trippstadt

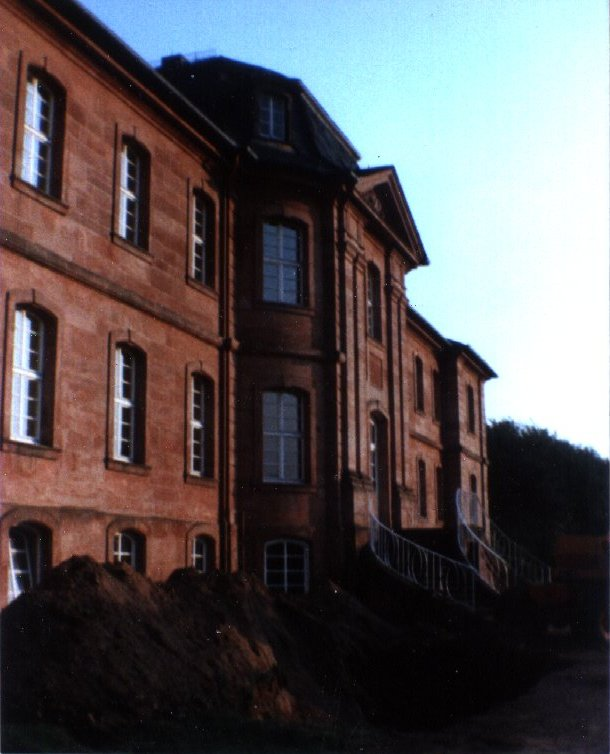
Trippstadt Palace

== See also ==
- List of rivers of Rhineland-Palatinate
