= Steinalben =

- Municipality
- Coat of arms

- Location of Steinalben within Südwestpfalz district
- Interactive map of Steinalben
- Location within Germany Location within Rhineland-Palatinate
- Coordinates: 49°18′55″N 7°39′22″E
- Country: Germany
- State: Rhineland-Palatinate
- District: Südwestpfalz
- Municipal assoc.: Waldfischbach-Burgalben

Government
  - Mayor (2019–24): Klaus Reischmann

Area
  - Total: 2.54 km^{2} (0.98 sq mi)
- Elevation: 260–286 m (853–938 ft)

Population (2025-12-31)
  - Total: 374
  - Density: 147/km^{2} (381/sq mi)
- Time zone: UTC+01:00 (CET)
  - Summer (DST): UTC+02:00 (CEST)
- Postal codes: 66851
- Dialling codes: 06333
- Vehicle registration: PS
- Website: www.vgwaldfischbach-burgalben.de

Steinalben (Palatine German: Stääalwe) is a municipality in Südwestpfalz district, in Rhineland-Palatinate, western Germany and belongs to the municipal association Waldfischbach-Burgalben.
