= Trippstadt =

- Municipality
- Coat of arms

- Location of Trippstadt within Kaiserslautern district
- Interactive map of Trippstadt
- Location within Germany Location within Rhineland-Palatinate
- Coordinates: 49°21′35″N 7°46′29″E
- Country: Germany
- State: Rhineland-Palatinate
- District: Kaiserslautern
- Subdivisions: 20

Government
  - Mayor (2019–24): Jens Specht

Area
  - Total: 43.72 km^{2} (16.88 sq mi)
- Elevation: 401 m (1,316 ft)

Population (2025-12-31)
  - Total: 2,789
  - Density: 63.79/km^{2} (165.2/sq mi)
- Time zone: UTC+01:00 (CET)
  - Summer (DST): UTC+02:00 (CEST)
- Postal codes: 67705
- Dialling codes: 06306
- Vehicle registration: KL
- Website: www.trippstadt.de

Trippstadt (German pronunciation: [ˈtʁɪpʃtat]) is a municipality in the district of Kaiserslautern, in Rhineland-Palatinate, western Germany.
