= Gräfenstein Land =

Coordinates: 49°14′27″N 7°45′24″E

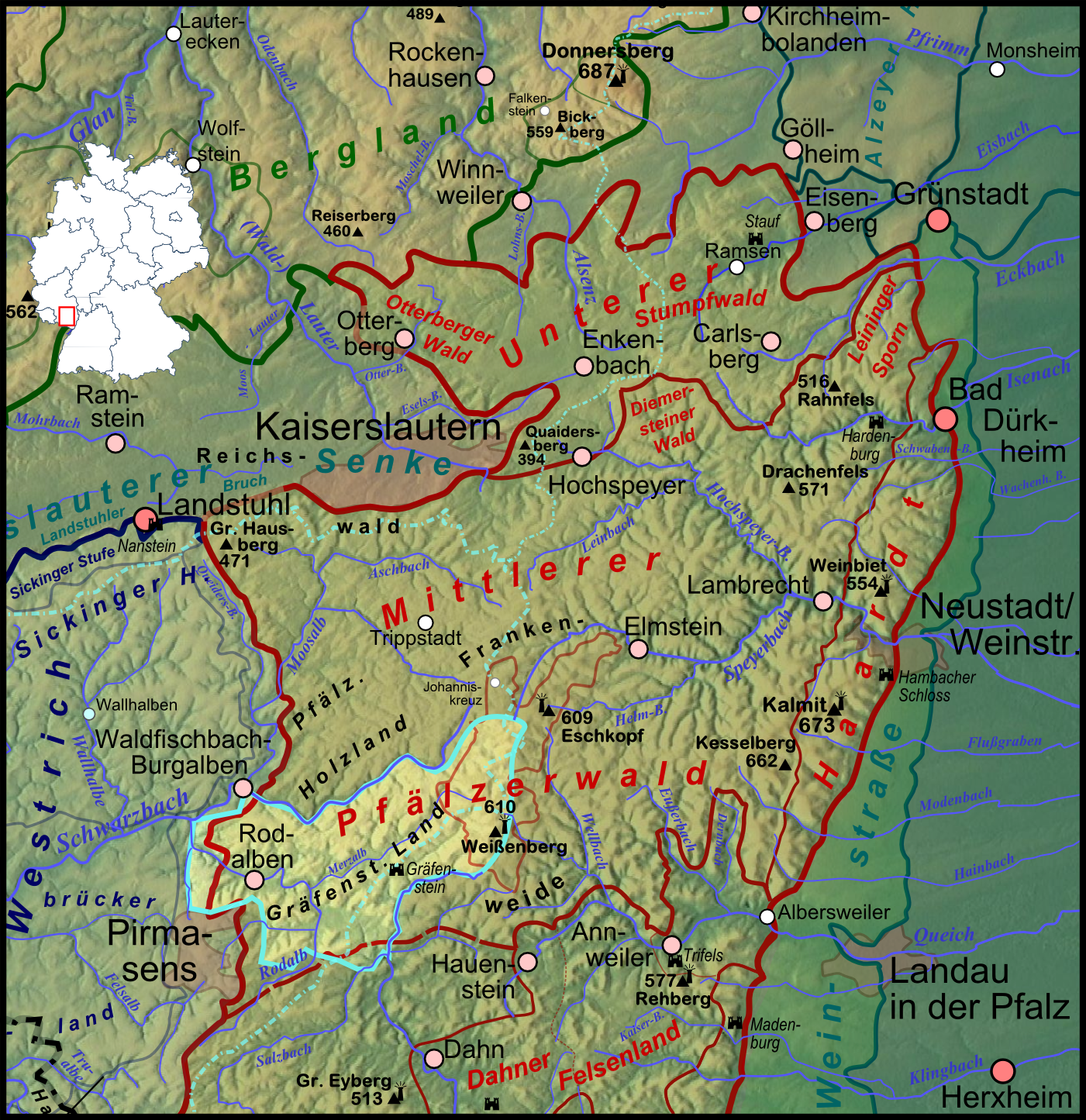
Gräfenstein Land (orange) within the Palatine Forest

Gräfenstein Land (German: Gräfensteiner Land) is a landscape region in the Palatinate, part of the German state of Rhineland-Palatinate. It is almost coincident with the collective municipality of Rodalben.

== Location and adjacent areas ==
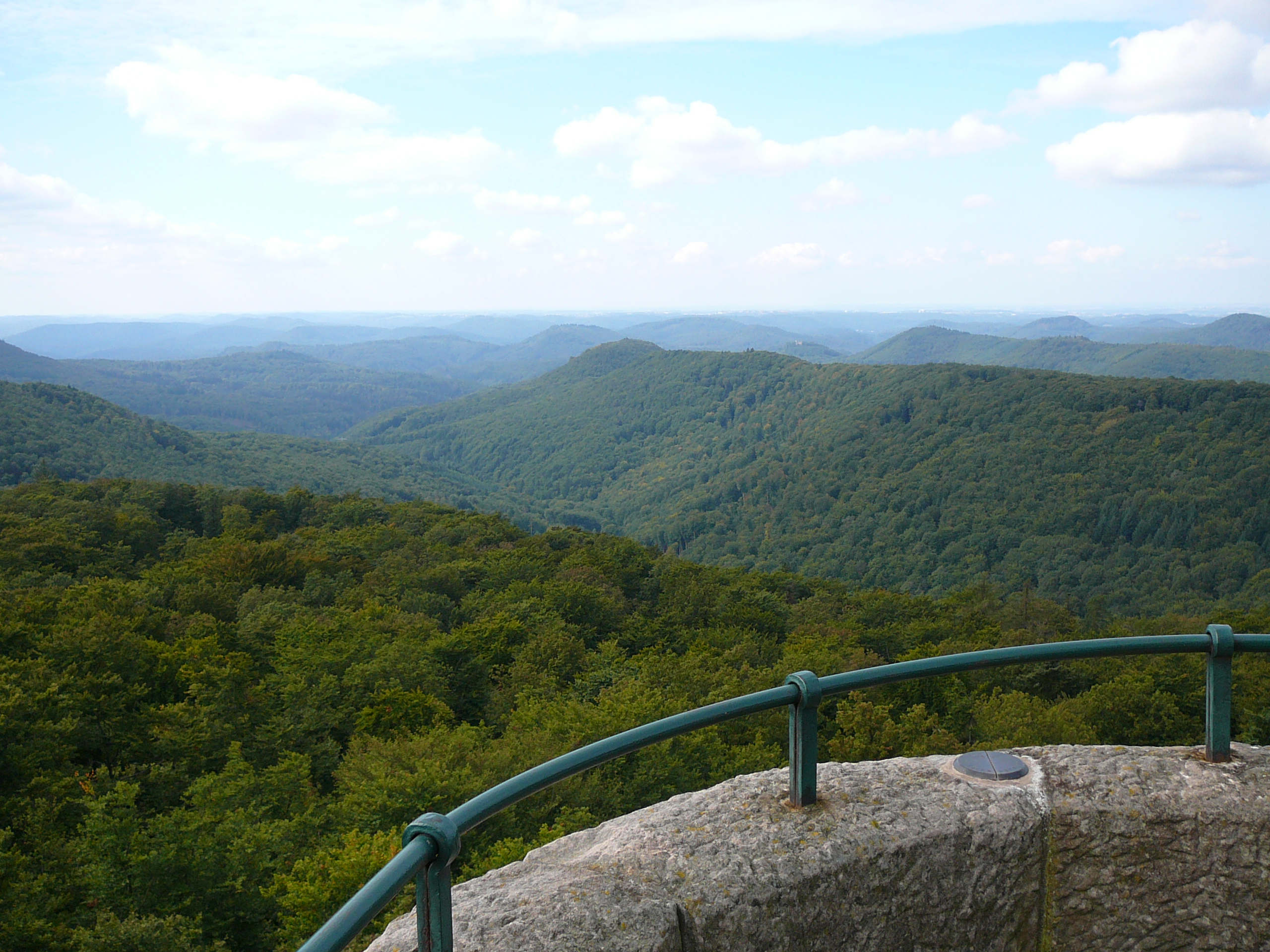
View from the Weißenberg hill over Gräfenstein Land. Gräfenstein Castle is in the centre

The "Land" lies in the southwest of the Palatine Forest, northeast of the city of Pirmasens, and is a component of the Palatinate Forest Nature Park, with a maximum elevation above sea level of 550 metres. The region is bounded in the west by the link road from Pirmasens, Rodalben and the River Schwarzach to Waldfischbach-Burgalben. In the east there is a natural boundary in the Wieslauter stream. To the south, Gräfenstein Land is bounded by the B 10 federal highway.

== Tourism ==
Tourism in Gräfenstein Land is dominated by hiking. There is a well constructed network of trails leading to striking bunter sandstone rocks and many sights such as Gräfenstein Castle near Merzalben and the Luitpold Tower.
