= Merzalben =

- Municipality
- Coat of arms

- Location of Merzalben within Südwestpfalz district
- Interactive map of Merzalben
- Location within Germany Location within Rhineland-Palatinate
- Coordinates: 49°14′40″N 7°43′51″E
- Country: Germany
- State: Rhineland-Palatinate
- District: Südwestpfalz
- Municipal assoc.: Rodalben

Government
  - Mayor (2019–24): Michael Köhler (CDU)

Area
  - Total: 30.01 km^{2} (11.59 sq mi)
- Elevation: 281 m (922 ft)

Population (2025-12-31)
  - Total: 1,173
  - Density: 39.09/km^{2} (101.2/sq mi)
- Time zone: UTC+01:00 (CET)
  - Summer (DST): UTC+02:00 (CEST)
- Postal codes: 66978
- Dialling codes: 06395
- Vehicle registration: PS
- Website: www.merzalben.de

Merzalben is a municipality in Südwestpfalz district, in Rhineland-Palatinate, western Germany, deriving its name from the Merzalbe, also known as the Merzalb, that flows through the village. Along with 5 other Ortsgemeinden ("local municipalities") Merzalben belongs to the Verbandsgemeinde Rodalben ("collective municipality of Rodalben") in Südwestpfalz, wherein it is the largest in terms of physical area, but the smallest in terms of population. The municipality contains several distinct natural and cultural landmarks, with the earliest known records dating back to 1237. It was also considered a state-approved tourist resort (German: Fremdenverkehrsort) before the title was dropped in Rhineland Palatinate in 2016 and all communities awarded the designation were barred from its use in 2020.

== Geography ==
=== Location ===
The town is located in the Palatinate Forest (German: Pfälzerwald), primarily within its sub-area Gräfenstein Land, with only the northeast portion located within the Frankenweide. The district area, which is 91% forested, is home to a number of notable tourist attractions, such as the Birkwieserhof restaurant, hiking trails on the Kupenberg, and the hamlet of Wieslauterhof. Merzalben is also neighbored by Leimen, exclave of WIlgartswiesen, exclave of Annweiler am Trifels, Wilgartswiesen, Münchweiler an der Rodalb and Clausen with the next largest town being Pirmasens to the southwest.

=== Mountains ===
Merzalben is encompassed by 6 mountains. Located about two kilometers east of the town are the mountains Winschertberg and Schlossberg, reaching 1709.32 ft (521m) and 1433.73 ft (437m) tall, respectively. Further south-east are the Wartenberg and its plateau, the Wartenberger Kopf, at 1617.45 ft (493 m), as well as the Vorderer Winschertkopf and the Schmale Hals. In the outermost eastern region of the district, the Weißenberg and Hortenkopf rise to 2000.98 ft (609.9m) and 1988.84 ft (606.2m) tall, with the 1938.32 ft (590.8m) tall Mühlenberg stretching along the boundary to Leimen in the west.

=== Bodies of Water ===
The Palatine Watershed (German: Pfälzische Hauptwasserscheide) runs directly through the municipal area with the Merzalbe flowing through the settlement area and the Wilhelmsbach connecting from the left. The Wartenbach flows further south, beyond the watershed and the residential areas, and is dammed shortly after its source to form the Gambswoog. Its left tributary, Scheidbach, initially forms the district boundary, which is then continued by the Wartenbach. In the area of the Merzalben/Münchweiler/Wilgartswiesen district triangle, the Wartenbach flows from the left into the Lauter, which starts about one kilometer north-west, above the Wieslauterhof, and continues past the district of Merzalben after absorbing the Wartenbach.

== History ==
Merzalben was first mentioned in 1237 in a document between the brothers Friedrich III and Emich IV of Leiningen as part of the division of goods that awarded the "Castrum Grebinstein" with the villages "Merichisalbin", "Rothalbin" and "Eiswilre". In 1381, the region that previously belonged to the Diocese of Metz was transferred to the Prince-Bishopric of Worms.

Until the end of the 18th century, the village of Merzalben belonged to the Margraviate of Baden. Then, in 1794, the left bank of the Rhine was occupied during the War of the First Coalition. From 1798 to 1814, when the Palatinate was part of the French First Republic (until 1804) and then part of the Napoleonic Empire, Merzalben was incorporated into the Canton of Waldfischbach in the First French Republic department, Mont-Tonnerre. During this time, the district was the seat of a town hall (French: Mairie), which also included Leimen.

Based on the agreements made at the Congress of Vienna, the area first became part of Austria in June 1815 and then ceded to the Kingdom of Bavaria in 1816 on the basis of a state treaty. Under the Bavarian administration, Merzalben belonged to the Land Commissariat of Pirmasens in the Circle of the Rhine (German: Rheinkreis) from 1817, which was subsequently converted into a district office.

In 1939, Merzalben was incorporated into the district of Pirmasens (later known as the district of Südwestpfalz in 1997). After World War II, the municipality of Merzalben became part of the Regierungsberzirk of Palatinate in the then newly formed state of Rhineland-Palatinate within the French occupation zone. In the course of the first administrative reform in Rhineland-Palatinate, the municipality was incorporated into the newly created Verbandsgemeinde Rodalben in 1972.

== Residents ==
=== Population growth ===
The growth of the population of Merzalben is based on censuses recorded from 1871 to 1987:

Year	Population
1815	360
1835	605
1871	647
1905	670
1939	919
1950	1,028
1961	1,160

Year	Population
1970	1,248
1987	1,268
1997	1,354
2005	1,293
2011	1,209
2017	1,153
2020	1,167

== Religion ==
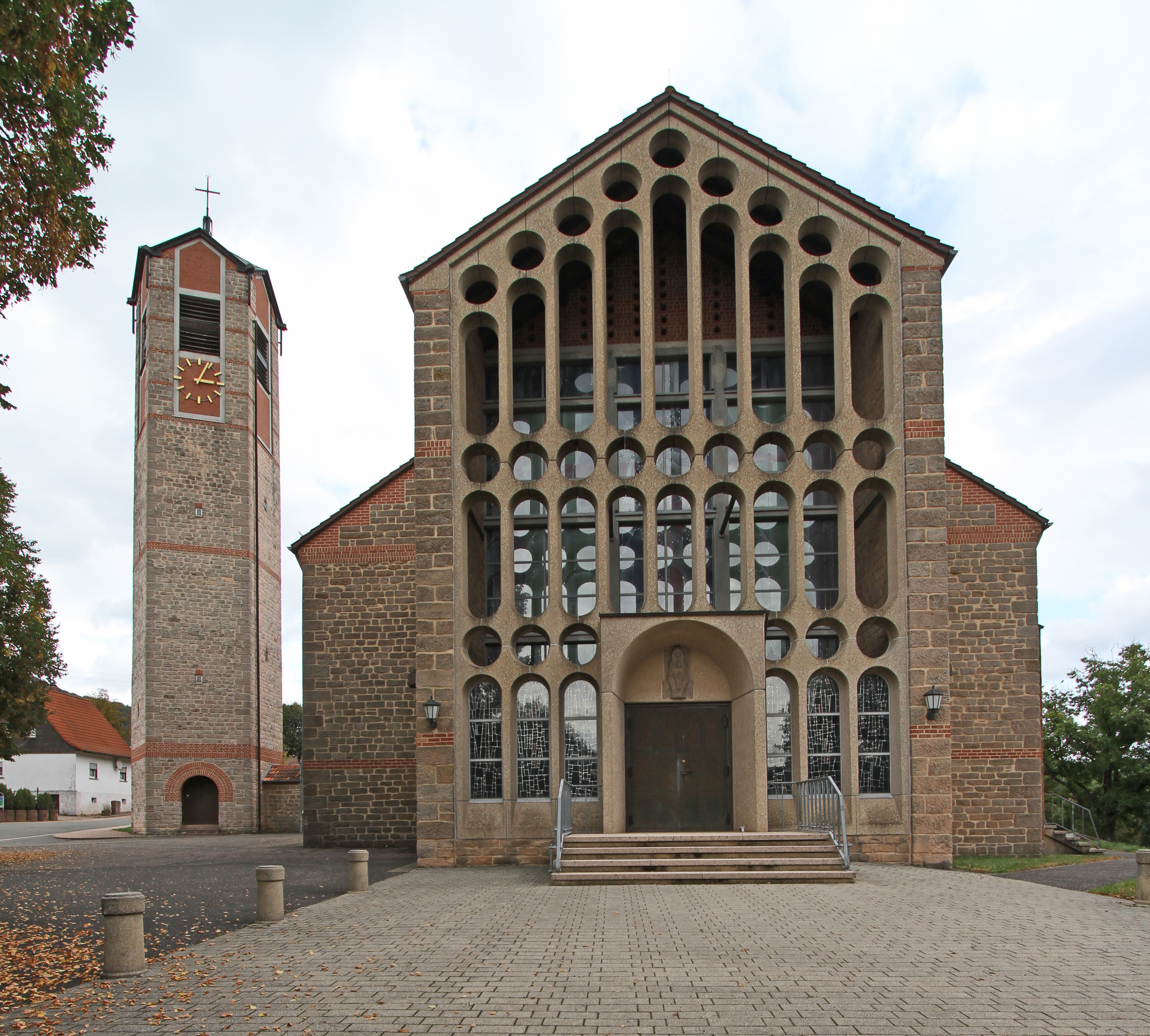
Merzalben Pfarrkirche Hl. Kreuz

At the end of 2014, 62.3% of the residents were Catholic, belonging to the Prince-Bishopric of Speyer, and 20.8% were Protestant, belonging to the Evangelical Church of the Palatinate. The remaining population belonged to another religion or were non-denominational. Until 1723, Merzalben belonged to the Catholic parish of Rodalben before it became independent in this regard. Initially, the local parish was also responsible for Leimen before the latter became independent in 1864.

== Politics ==
The local council (German: Gemeinderat) in Merzalben consists of 16 councillors, who were appointed in the local election (German: Kommunalwahl) on May 26, 2019, and whose honorary local mayor is the chairman.

Allocation of seats in the municipal council:

Election	SPD	CDU	BGM	Total
2019	7	9	-	16 seats
2014	7	9	-	16 seats
2009	7	8	1	16 seats
2004	7	7	2	16 seats

- SPD = Social Democratic Party of Germany
- CDU = Christian Democratic Union of Germany
- BGM = Civic Community of Merzalben (German: Bürgermeisterschaft Merzalben e. V.)

=== Mayor ===
Michael Köhler (CDU) became Mayor of Merzalben on July 10, 2019. In the direct election (German: Direktwahl) on May 26, 2019, he was elected for five years with 75.38% of the vote. Köhler's predecessor was Benno Schwarz (CDU).

=== Coat of Arms ===

Blazon: "Parted by blue and gold, above a growing gold-armed silver griffin, holding a small golden shield with a red slanting bar, below on green hill a red castle."

Justification: It was approved by the Mainz Ministry of the Interior in 1956 with the griffin commemorating the former affiliation with the Margraviate of Baden.

== Culture and Landmarks ==
=== Cultural Monuments ===
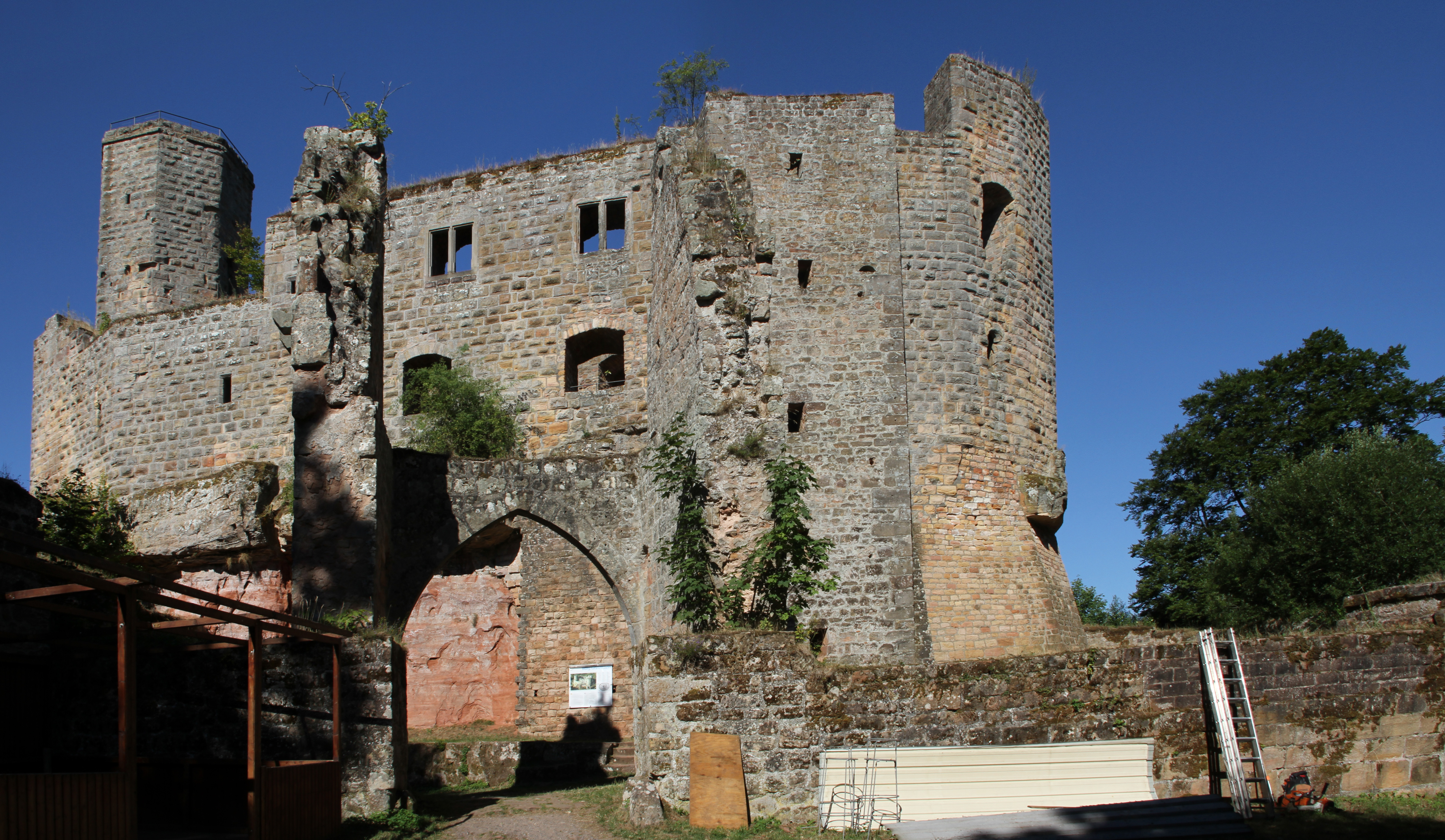
Gräfenstein Castle

The region contains two major monument zones (German: Denkmalzonen), including the ruins of Gräfenstein Castle which are about two kilometers east of the settlement area and give the region its name, as well as the Wieslauterhof, a hamlet located between the Orstgemeinden Hinterwedenthal and Merzalben.

There are also a total of 13 individual objects that are protected as cultural property (German: Denkmalschutz), including the 91.86 ft (28m) tall Luitpold Tower, built in 1909 on the summit of the Weißenberg, as an observation tower. Additionally, the Dreiherrenstein, which is also identified as Ritterstein 57, is located directly on the district boundary to Wilgartswiesen.

=== Natural Landmarks ===
The core zone headwaters of the Wieslauter in the Palatinate Forest Nature Park (German: Naturpark Pfälzerwald), which span roughly 2,400-hectare (9.27 sq mi), are partly located within the Merzalben area.

=== Local Nickname ===
The local nickname for the residents of Merzalben was once "Neecher", from the Palatinate dialect for "Negro"; this supposedly originates from the words of a pastor named Richard Frank: "You want to be Christians? heathen you are. Neecher you are!"

=== Carnival ===
Since 2017, the so-called night parade (German: Nachtumzug) has taken place every year on Shrove Tuesday (German: Fasching or Fastnacht), organized by local carnival club, "Närrische Neecher Merzalben", meaning "Foolish Negros of Merzalben", which derived its name from the local nickname "Neecher". In 2019, the regional broadcasting corporation specific to southwest German, SWR (German: Südwestrundfunk meaning Southwest Broadcasting), covered the controversy behind the group's name. After the club's Facebook page was banned due to accusations of racism as a result of the name, the club decided to adopt a new name, "Merzalwer Burgnarren", meaning "Merzalben Castle Jesters" in 2021.

"Recently, when the Black Lives Matter movement picked up speed, it was clear that this name couldn't go any further," said club chairwoman Sylvia Teuscher in an interview with SWR. The club logo was also abolished, which previously showed "a black man jumping over the wall of Gräfenstein Castle".

=== Ritterstein ===
A Ritterstein ("knight stone") is a sandstone marker with chiseled inscriptions indicating historically or naturally remarkable locations throughout the Palatinate Forest and a few of these markers can be found throughout the district of Merzalben. In addition to the aforementioned Dreiherrenstein, designated as Ritterstein 57, there is also Ritterstein 54 Schäferei, which refers to the sheep farm of Gräfenstein Castle, Ritterstein 55 Spalt, a ravine popularly called "Split", and Ritterstein 56 Königswoog, which marks a woog of the same name that was once used for timber drifting.

== Economy and Infrastructure ==
=== Economy ===
After the Second World War, Merzalben was part of the Pirmasens Military Community, which has since been dissolved. A local importer also temporarily sold Jaguar cars, among others. The municipality was the seat of Raiffeisenkasse Merzalben eGmbH, which later merged into VR-Bank Südwestpfalz Pirmasens-Zweibrücken in 1962 and several subsequent mergers.

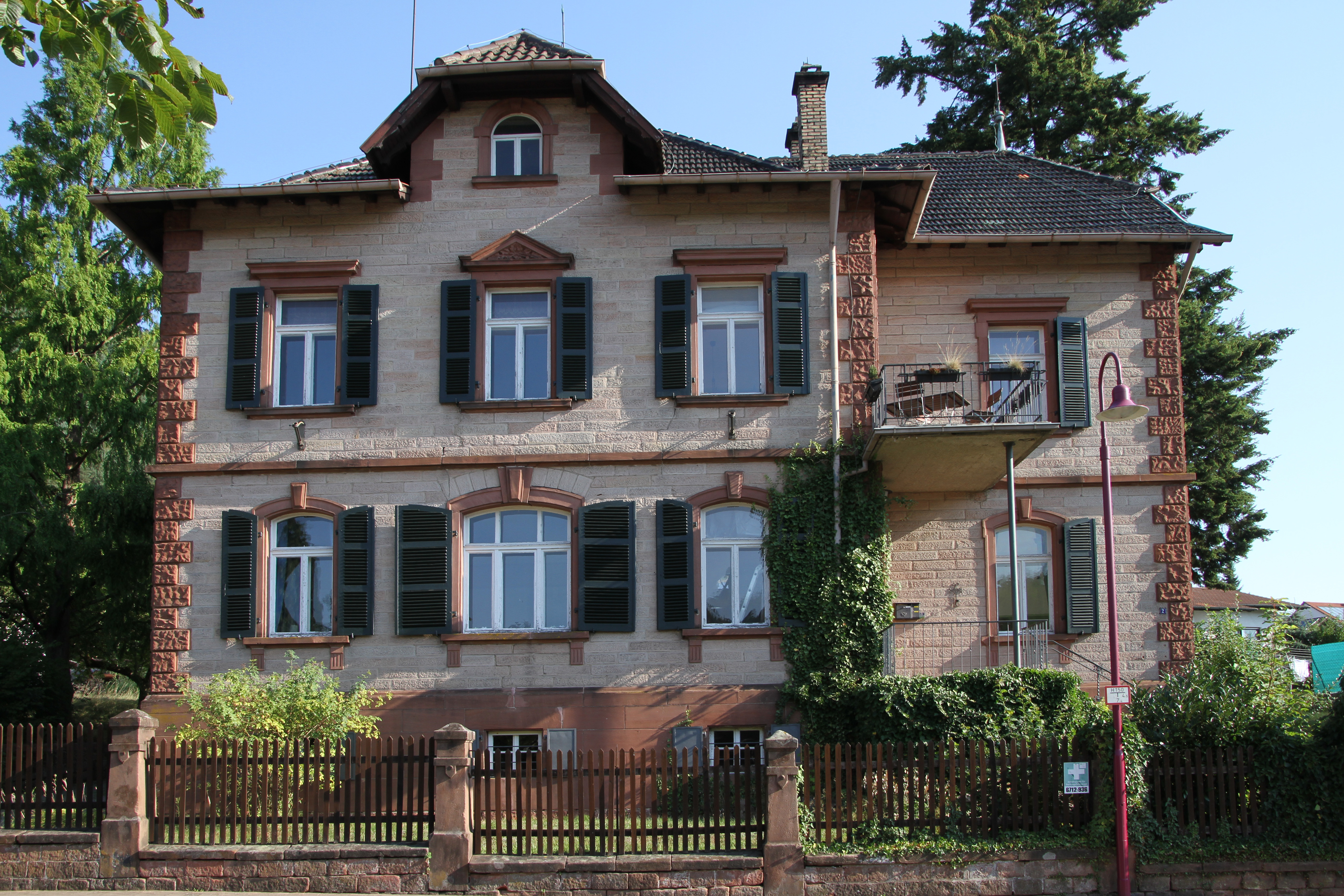
House of the foster

=== Traffic ===
State road 496 runs through the town. District road 52 connects the settlement area with Gräfenstein Castle. There is a connection to long-distance traffic via the nearby Thaleischweiler-Fröschen slip road of the A 62.

=== Tourism ===
On the outskirts of the village is the Gräfensteinhütte, a hut or refuge managed by Merzalben's local Palatine Forest Club (German: Pfälzerwald-Verein). A cycle path, called the Palatinate Forest Tour (German: Pfälzerwald-Tour), runs through the entire municipality, leading from Kaiserslautern to Hinterweidenthal, along with a so-called quality hiking trail (German: Prädikatswanderweg), known as the Palatinate Forest Path (German: Pfälzer Waldpfad), which also connects Merzalben to Kaiserslautern and Schweigen-Rechtenbach. Additionally, Merzalben is a location on the Donnersberg-Donon long-distance hiking trail (German: Fernwanderweg Donnersberg–Donon) and the Nahegau-Wasgau-Vogesen long-distance hiking trail (German: Fernwanderweg Nahegau-Wasgau-Vogesen).

A number of smaller hiking trails can also be found running through the forest district, including one marked with a blue cross, and one marked with a green cross which leads from Freinsheim to the Erlenkopf. A path marked with a blue and red bar also leads from Kirchheimbolanden to Pirmasens.

== Important Figures ==
=== Sons and Daughters of the Community ===
- Karl Maenner (1850–1927), Reich judicial councilman
- Isidor Markus Emanuel (1905–1991), Bishop of Speyer

=== People who worked on site ===
- Pietro Pileo di Prata (~1330–1401), Italian count, bishop, cardinal and papal diplomat, initiated Merzalben's change of diocese in 1381.
- Rudolf Frieß (1881–1965), hunter and author; head forester in the Merzalben forest office from 1924 to 1935.
