= Donsieders =

- Municipality
- Coat of arms

- Location of Donsieders within Südwestpfalz district
- Interactive map of Donsieders
- Location within Germany Location within Rhineland-Palatinate
- Coordinates: 49°15′54″N 7°38′34″E
- Country: Germany
- State: Rhineland-Palatinate
- District: Südwestpfalz
- Municipal assoc.: Rodalben

Government
  - Mayor (2019–24): Peter Spitzer (SPD)

Area
  - Total: 9.03 km^{2} (3.49 sq mi)
- Elevation: 320 m (1,050 ft)

Population (2025-12-31)
  - Total: 897
  - Density: 99.3/km^{2} (257/sq mi)
- Time zone: UTC+01:00 (CET)
  - Summer (DST): UTC+02:00 (CEST)
- Postal codes: 66978
- Dialling codes: 06333
- Vehicle registration: PS
- Website: www.donsieders.de

Donsieders is a municipality in Südwestpfalz district, in Rhineland-Palatinate, western Germany and belongs to the municipal association of Rodalben.

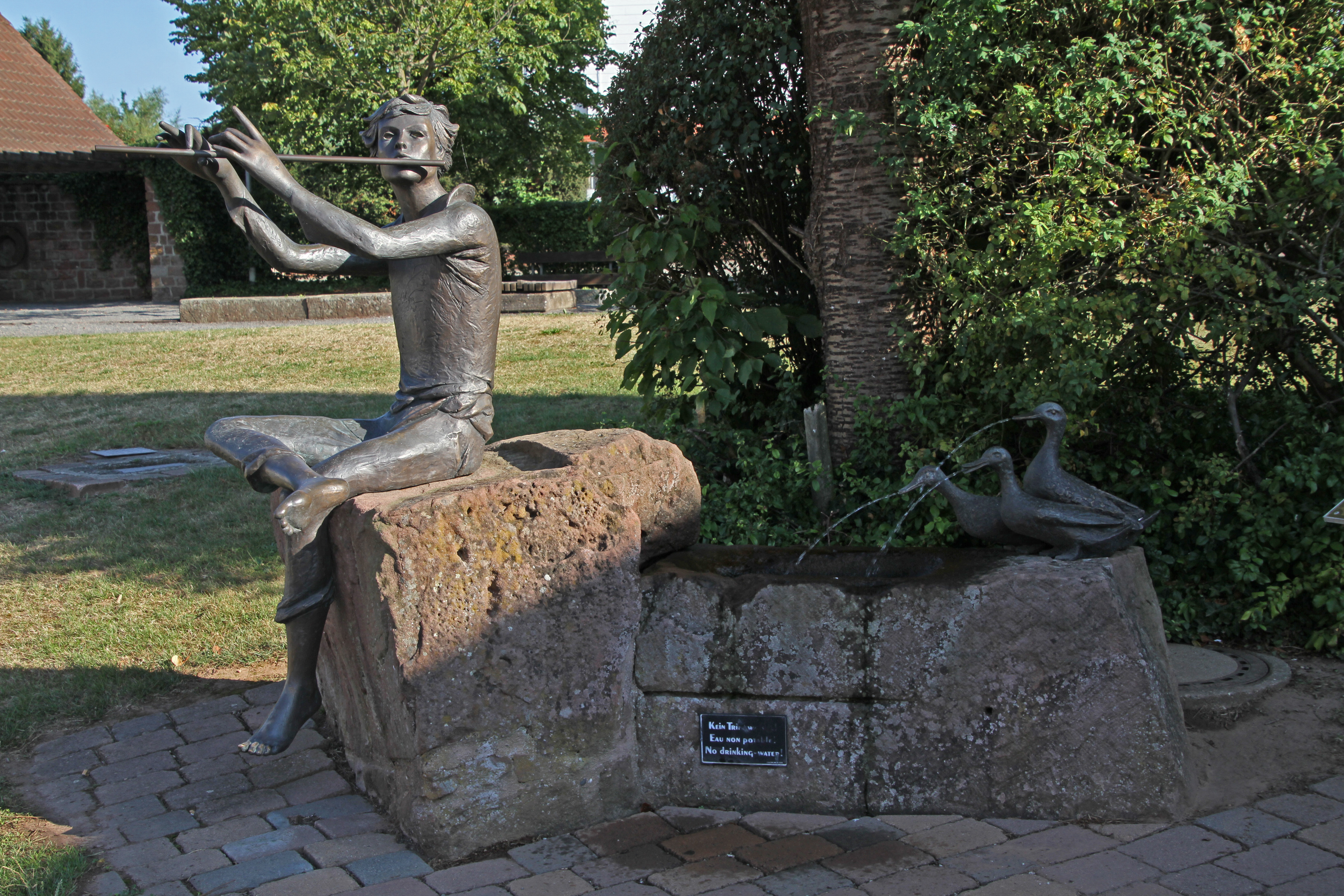
Flute player
