= Maßweiler =

- Municipality
- Coat of arms

- Location of Maßweiler within Südwestpfalz district
- Interactive map of Maßweiler
- Location within Germany Location within Rhineland-Palatinate
- Coordinates: 49°16′6″N 7°31′51″E
- Country: Germany
- State: Rhineland-Palatinate
- District: Südwestpfalz
- Municipal assoc.: Thaleischweiler-Wallhalben

Government
  - Mayor (2019–24): Herbert Semmet

Area
  - Total: 10.86 km^{2} (4.19 sq mi)
- Elevation: 245 m (804 ft)

Population (2025-12-31)
  - Total: 906
  - Density: 83.4/km^{2} (216/sq mi)
- Time zone: UTC+01:00 (CET)
  - Summer (DST): UTC+02:00 (CEST)
- Postal codes: 66506
- Dialling codes: 06334
- Vehicle registration: PS
- Website: www.massweiler.de

Maßweiler (German pronunciation: [ˈmaːsvaɪlɐ]) is a municipality in Südwestpfalz district, in Rhineland-Palatinate, western Germany.

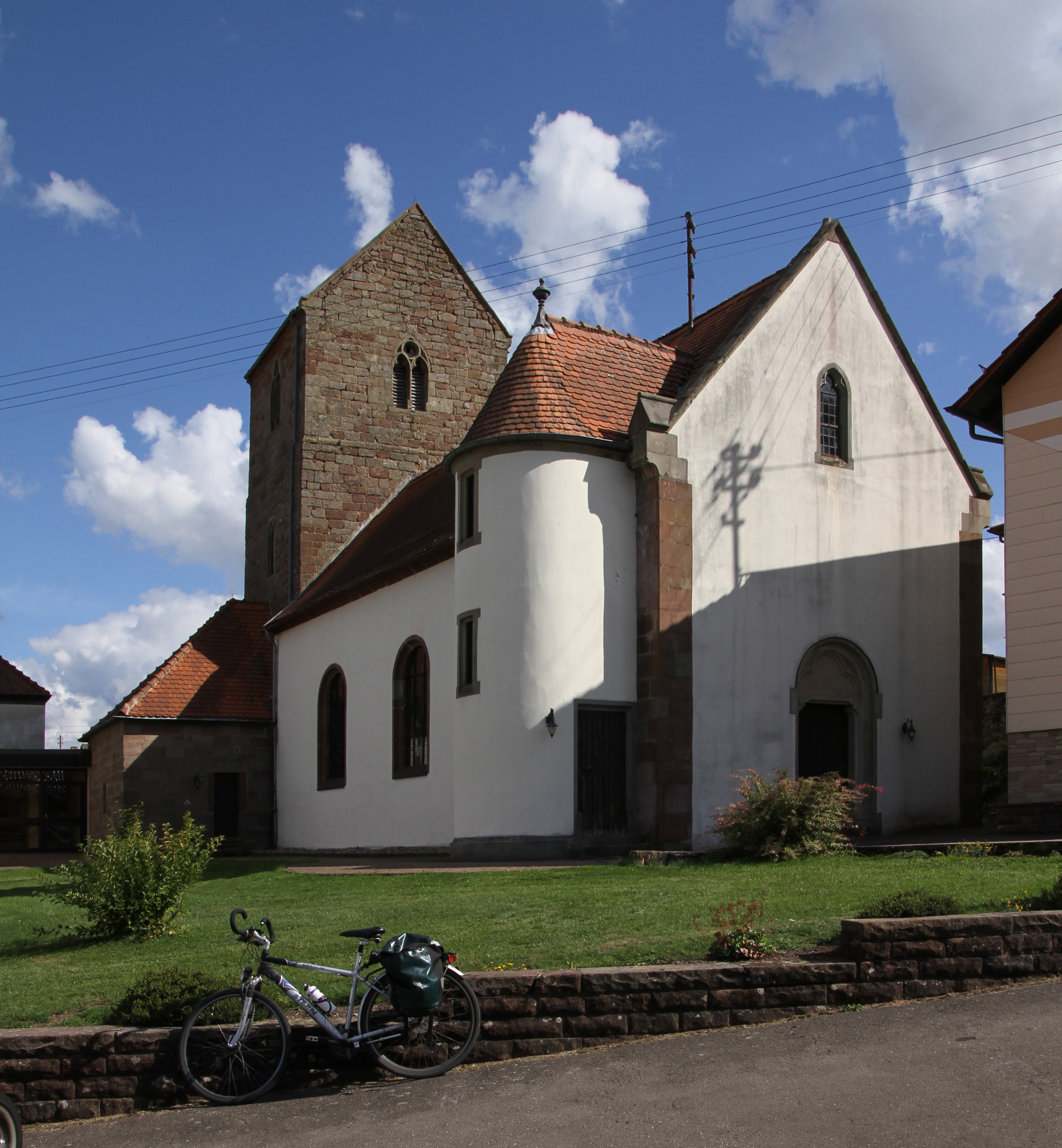
Protestant church

Maßweiler possessed a large cavern that had been used by Nazis in World War II. There were supposedly five levels in the cave, the lowest of which had trouble with occasional flooding. A large staircase for pedestrian traffic was near the highest point of the cavern, which led to an exit. Beside the stairs were rails that assisted in transport of earth from the cavern as it was being enlarged for German forces. The angle of this stair and matching rail system was estimated to be 30 degrees, and the height of the chamber approximately 175 feet.

After the end of World War II, the cavern was occupied by the U.S. Army, in the late 1980s by a communications company. Entering the property, it appeared quite small and remote, but upon entering the cavern, the length and size of the facility was impressive.

When the U.S. Army began to downsize in the 1990s, Maßweiler, and associated U.S. Army posts from Husterhoeh Kaserne (Pirmasens), the larger Kassern in the immediate area, were returned to Germany. Other small Army posts within this group were located at Munchweiler, Fischbach, and Clausen.
