= Husterhöh Kaserne =

Military facility in Germany

Coordinates: 49.2268°N 7.6117°E

The Husterhöh-Kaserne was a military facility in Pirmasens, Rhineland-Palatinate, Germany. Kaserne is a German loanword that means "barracks." It was a United States military base 1945–1994. Since then it is a German base, most of which has closed. The base still has some US military operations and German military storage.

== Location ==
It is at the Northern edge of the city of Pirmasens, approximately 15 miles (24 km) from the French border. It is bordered on the east by the Bundesstraße 270 and the west by Landesstraße 482.

== Construction ==
Originally built in place of an apple orchard, the Husterhoeh Kaserne covered a large plateau to the North of the city of Pirmasens, as well having an extremely large system of caves and tunnels that ran to adjacent townships. The facility was initially started by the Germans during the 1930s; above-ground facilities were built to house Wehrmacht soldiers manning the Siegfried Line along the French border and included tunneling extensive underground facilities. Work was stopped in 1941 due to the war needs for personnel and resumed minorly in 1944. The facility was captured on 21 March 1945 by the 71st Infantry Division, used as a war materials storage center, then was expanded by additional construction from the late 1950s through mid 1970s; in 1976 it was officially created as a full army base of its own right (US Military Community, Pirmasens). The last construction under US Military control was construction of replacement motor pool facilities for the 59th MP Co, in 1986–1987 and a new Electronic Equipment repair facility on the Kaserne and an underground Circuit Card repair facility in one of the tunnels originally constructed by the German Army. Since return to German control of the majority of the base, additional construction, removal and modification of existing buildings has occurred.

== Current use ==
Most of the facility is now used as commercial property, with multiple car dealerships and commercial companies on the site. The city has also located a major soccer stadium on the site. The US Army Medical Materiel Center - Europe (USAMMCE) is still operational and continues to occupy its former location (relocated to Kaiserlautern.) The heliport landing strip has been removed and is a grass field; numerous other buildings have been removed or re-engineered for other uses including the former US Army fire station (removed), the motorpool buildings to the north of the 76th Transportation Company (Medium Truck)'s motorpool (removed), etc. The buildings, which have neither been re-inhabited/re-used nor demolished, are in very poor condition (source: personal visits, 1999, 2005, 2008). The curved "Banana" Building has been modified with a museum and related entrance at the center, the entrance of which now faces outwards. The POMCUS storage facilities are now used by the German military for POMCUS storage. The American street names have been retained.

== Historical use ==
- 1937–1944: German Military facility, utilized as a combination factory-fortress facility and above-ground barracks.
- 1944–1945: German Military-run facility, utilized as an air raid shelter for Niedersimten.
- 1945–1976: US Military facility, general depot, used as a precursor for POMCUS-type storage of ready-to-roll armor.
- 1976: US Military facility, officially classified as a complete base; creation of USMCA-P, under control of the 21st Support Command.
- 1976–1994: US Military facility, complete base, US Military Medical Materiel Center and HQ for 59th Ordnance Brigade. POMCUS site.
- April 22, 1994: Official hand-over ceremony, returning control of the majority of the base to the Germans.
- June 15, 1994: Official date of turn-over.

== Current units ==
U.S. Army Medical Materiel Center – Europe (USAMMCE)

== Historical units ==
- 5th Maintenance Battalion, 7th Augmentation Group, 1964–1965
- 2nd Military Intelligence Battalion 7th Army, This unit tracked missions that 73rd CBTI out of Stuttgart flew along the East German and Czech borders. The OV1D and RV1D aircraft carrying SLAR and Quick Look II systems.
- HHC, 3rd Ordnance Battalion
- 511th MP Platoon, Convoy and Railroad escort for classified materials (Early '60's)
- 5th Combat Equipment Company
- 9th Ordnance
- 12th Ordnance Bn (SWD)
- 71st Ordnance Group
- 22nd Aviation Detachment
- 58th Signal Company (Support) This unit was at Husterhoeh in 1959, 1960 and early 1961
- 59th Military Police Company (59th MP, 95th MP Battalion, 21st Support Command, USAEUR)
- 59th Ordnance Brigade HQ (Advanced Weapons Support Command)
- 165th Signal Company, serving 59th Ordnance Brigade
- 63rd Finance Support Unit
- 76th Transportation Company (Medium Truck) (53rd Transportation Bn, 37th Transportation Group, 4th TRANSCOM, USAEUR)
- 2nd Battalion 56th and 2nd Battalion 60th Air Defense Artillery
- 294th Base Support Battalion (responsible for draw-down & turn-over of base, 1992–1994).
- 415th Base Support Battalion (remote: located in Kaiserslautern, assumed responsibilities of 294th BSB)
- 504th Engineering Service Company
- 524th Maintenance Company (TMDE)
- Detachment B, 201st ASA (502nd I&S Bn, 66th MI Gp)
- Headquarters Company, Pirmasens Army Base (USMCA-P)
- Team 4, SDEUR, (527th MI Bn, 66th MI Gp)
- US Army Medical Materiel Center – Europe (USAMMCE)
- 563rd Ordnance Company (1992–1994)
- 267th Signal Company (Source: ECHO, April 1984) The responsibilities of the 267th Signal Company in Pirmasens include operating and maintaining fixed station communications equipment, including Pirmasens Dial Central Office, Lohnsfeld MARS gateway station, Pirmasens microwave station and telecommunications center, high-frequency transmitter and receiver sites scattered throughout the countryside
- 270th Signal Company – Activated 1975 in (West) Germany – Inactivated 15 September 1993 in Germany (AUTODIN Switching Facility personnel)
- 74th Army Postal Unit
- 79th Engineer Battalion (Construction). (It was assigned to HQ Company from Sep 60 – Apr 63)
- 546th Maintenance Company – The unit provides Direct Support Maintenance Service on an area basis for military standard equipment
- USASSG, ACSI, Communications Unit, Pirmasens, Germany (Attached Unit, permanent assignment was room 2A514, The Pentagon, Washington DC)
- Detachment 13, European Special Activities Area (ESAA)
- 92nd Ordnance Detachment became 565th Ordnance Company, close support for the 32nd Air Defense Artillery Battalion.
- Pirmasens Resident Agency, Second Region, USACIDC (Army CID)
- 73rd Signal Battalion. Units were HHD, 267th and 270th Signal Companies, Pirmasens; 298th Signal Company, Kaiserslautern; 327th Signal Company, Zweibrucken; and the Landstuhl SATCOM Facility.
- USA Permissive Action Link Detachment

== Outlying bases ==
Husterhoeh Kaserne served as the primary base for several outlying smaller bases, including:

- US Army General Hospital (USAH) at Muenchweiler
- Fischbach Ordnance Depot
- Maßweiler Ordnance Depot
- Clausen Depot
- Miesau Army Depot
- and over 27 other storage sites

These smaller supported bases and storage have been returned to German control as well.

A small unit, specializing in convoy escort, was also stationed at the kaserne, though for a brief period. It was the 511th MP platoon, housed in a 2-story building well to the rear of the facility. The unit guided, managed traffic control and served as a lightly armed escort for convoys carrying exotic weapons and their parts throughout Germany. Later (not sure of dates) the unit was transferred to Maßweiler, then disbanded and the unit's members were portioned out as security guards at Dahn and Fischbach. The unit also served as OPFOR (then called something "aggressors" or something like that) for ordnance units when they went to the field.

The US Army's 636th Ordnance Company (EOD) (with a housing base at Muenchweiler) guarded and maintained the then classified stocks of GB and VX nerve gas located at Site 59 in Clausen. This unit became the 330th Ordnance Company, 110th MP Company, 763rd Medical Det., and 98th Chemical Det. The nerve agents at Site 59, were removed under Operation Steel Box in 1990. These agents were transported by truck, rail and ship ultimately ending up at Johnston Atoll for incineration at the Johnston Atoll Chemical Agent Disposal System facility.

== See also ==
- Kaiserslautern Military Community
