= Clausen, Germany =

Clausen
- Municipality
- Coat of arms

- Location of Clausen within Südwestpfalz district
- Interactive map of Clausen
- Location within Germany Location within Rhineland-Palatinate
- Coordinates: 49°15′37″N 7°40′35″E
- Country: Germany
- State: Rhineland-Palatinate
- District: Südwestpfalz
- Municipal assoc.: Rodalben

Government
  - Mayor (2019–24): Harald Wadle (CDU)

Area
  - Total: 12.46 km^{2} (4.81 sq mi)
- Elevation: 400 m (1,300 ft)

Population (2025-12-31)
  - Total: 1,367
  - Density: 109.7/km^{2} (284.2/sq mi)
- Time zone: UTC+01:00 (CET)
  - Summer (DST): UTC+02:00 (CEST)
- Postal codes: 66978
- Dialling codes: 06333
- Vehicle registration: PS
- Website: www.clausen.de

Clausen (German pronunciation: [ˈklaʊzn̩]) is a municipality in Südwestpfalz district, in Rhineland-Palatinate, western Germany. Clausen belongs to the local association community of Rodalben.

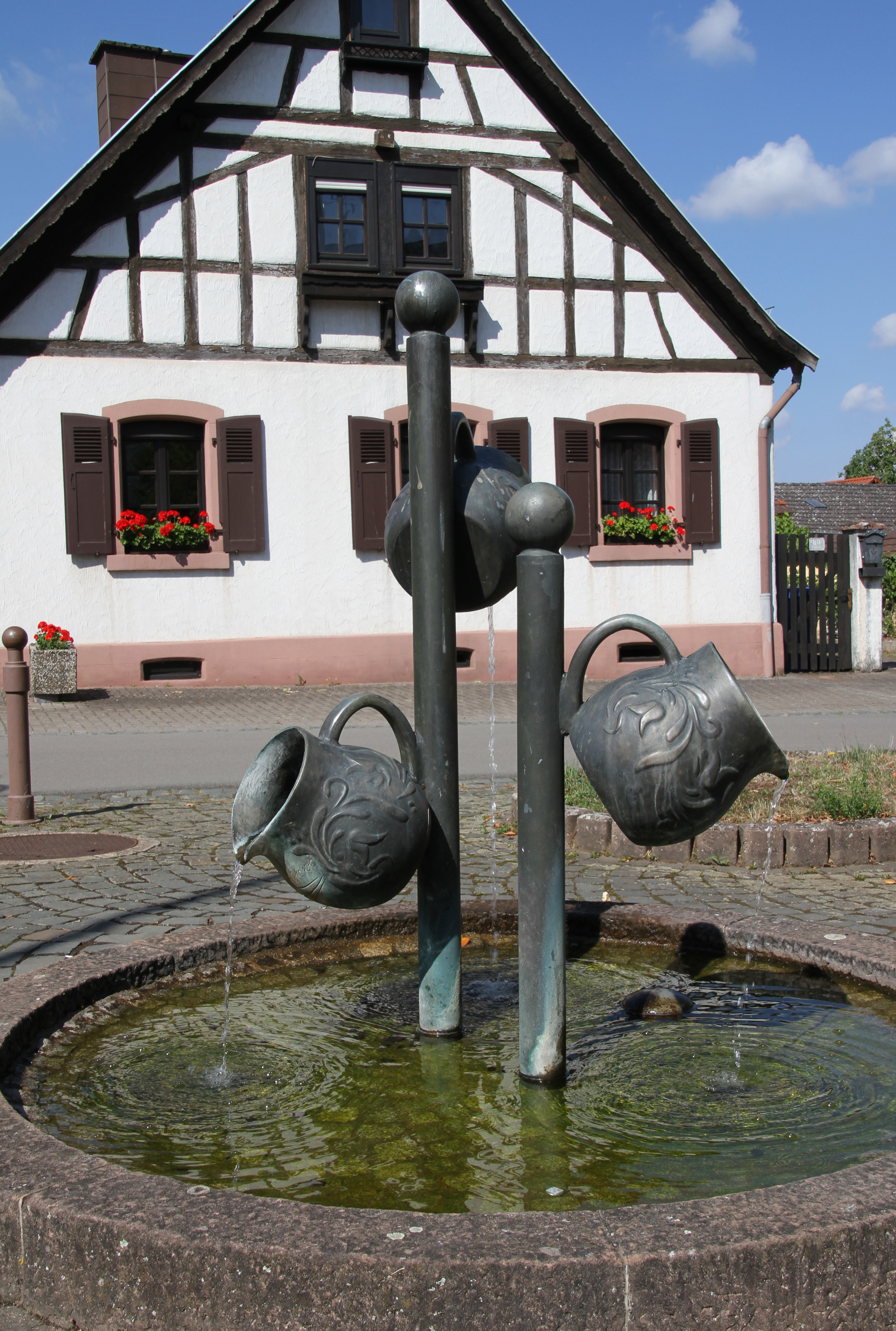
Fountain of pots

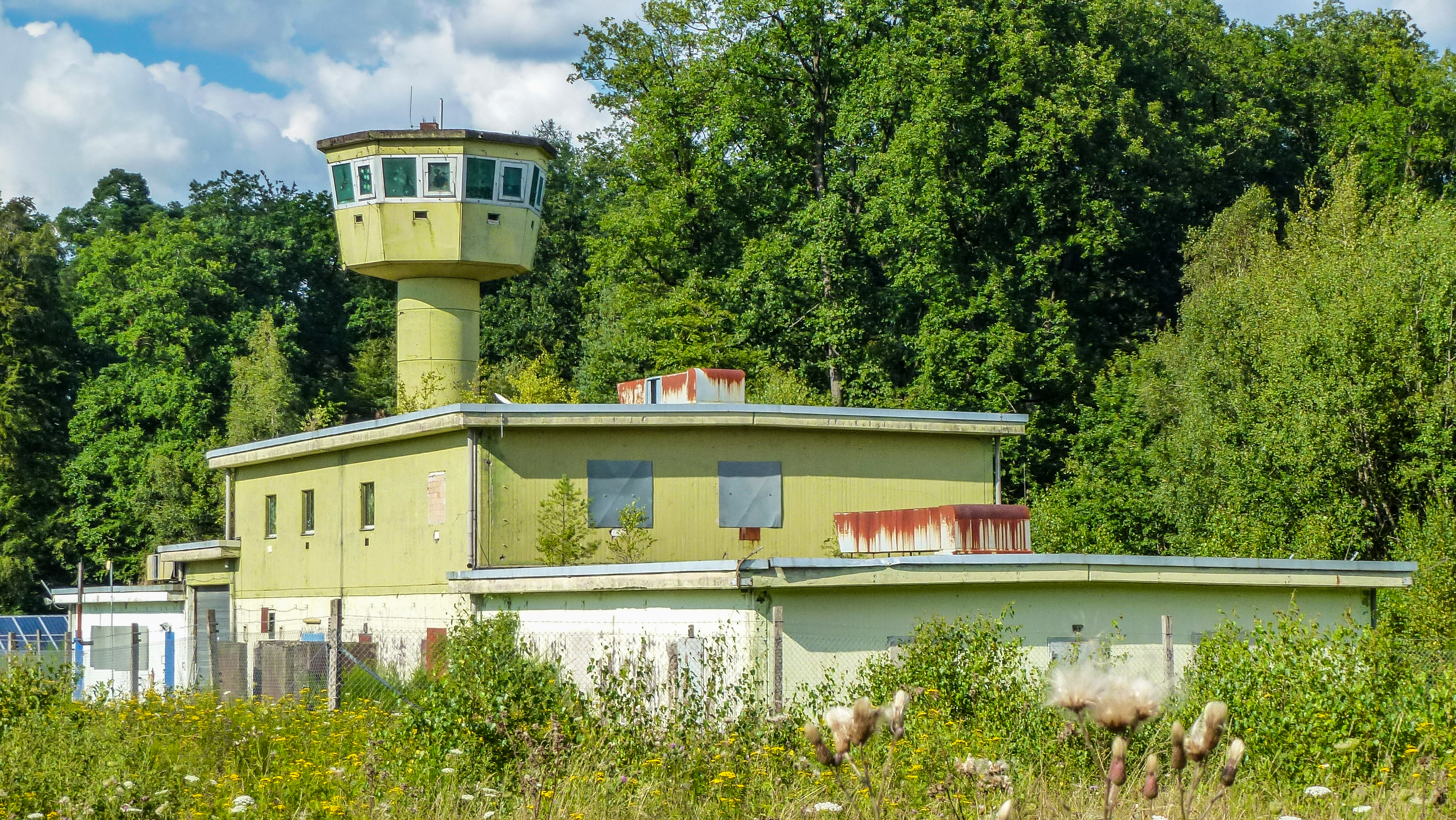
Watchtower of the former Clausen special weapons warehouse

The US Army's 330th Ordnance Company maintained the then classified stocks of GB and VX nerve gas located at Site 59 in Clausen. 110th Military Police company was in charge of guarding the site with a 42 man guard force. The nerve agents at Site 59 were removed under Operation Steel Box in 1990. These shells were poorly maintained and had numerous leaks from the caustic chemicals that they contained. In addition, the fence line was supposedly sprayed with Agent Orange to deter weeds. A maintenance program in 1979 removed a number of broken shells and replaced the gaskets on those that were still uncompromised. The shells were transported by truck, rail and ship ultimately ending up at Johnston Atoll for incineration at the Johnston Atoll Chemical Agent Disposal System facility. Site 59 was sold and the bunkers were used to grow mushrooms. The area also had solar panels added for power generation. There is a 2.5 ton truck buried under the circular area used as a heliport - the truck was stolen from Pirmasens' base and used for spare parts during an inspection in 1976. A M151 Jeep in also buried next to the nearby bunker.

When the US military began to downsize in the 1990s, the small US Army posts associated with Husterhoeh Kaserne (Pirmasens) were returned to Germany, including ones located at Maßweiler, Munchweiler, Fischbach, and Clausen. This site is currently used as a combination mushroom farm and solar energy site.

A large number of former soldiers, who worked at Site 59, report illnesses consistent with nerve gas exposure. The US Veterans Administration has denied all claims for conditions related to exposure to date. These soldiers often have unexplained rashes, anxiety and diabetes. There were multiple maintenance programs to maintain the shells and to dispose of any with severe leaks. The last maintenance program prior to this site closing terminated in 1981. When Operation Steel Box removed the shells in 1990, multiple shells were found to have leaks.

Clausen's primary industry is agricultural though it is a short drive to Pirmasens. It is located nearby the recreation area Clausensee and the area has many opportunities for outdoor recreation. The fields east of Clausen contain many concrete tank barriers remaining from WWII.
