= Münchweiler an der Rodalb =

- Municipality
- Coat of arms

- Location of Münchweiler an der Rodalb within Südwestpfalz district
- Interactive map of Münchweiler an der Rodalb
- Location within Germany Location within Rhineland-Palatinate
- Coordinates: 49°13′04″N 7°42′15″E
- Country: Germany
- State: Rhineland-Palatinate
- District: Südwestpfalz
- Municipal assoc.: Rodalben

Government
  - Mayor (2019–24): Timo Bäuerle (CDU)

Area
  - Total: 27.18 km^{2} (10.49 sq mi)
- Elevation: 296 m (971 ft)

Population (2025-12-31)
  - Total: 2,760
  - Density: 102/km^{2} (263/sq mi)
- Time zone: UTC+01:00 (CET)
  - Summer (DST): UTC+02:00 (CEST)
- Postal codes: 66981
- Dialling codes: 06395
- Vehicle registration: PS
- Website: www.muenchweiler.de

Münchweiler an der Rodalb (German pronunciation: [ˈmʏnçvaɪlɐ ʔan deːɐ̯ ˈʁoːtʔalp], lit. 'Münchweiler on the Rodalb') is a municipality in Südwestpfalz district, in Rhineland-Palatinate, Germany, and belongs to the municipal association of Rodalben. The primary industry of the village was that of a shoe manufacturer. It lies on Strasse B-10 between Karlsruhe and Pirmasens.

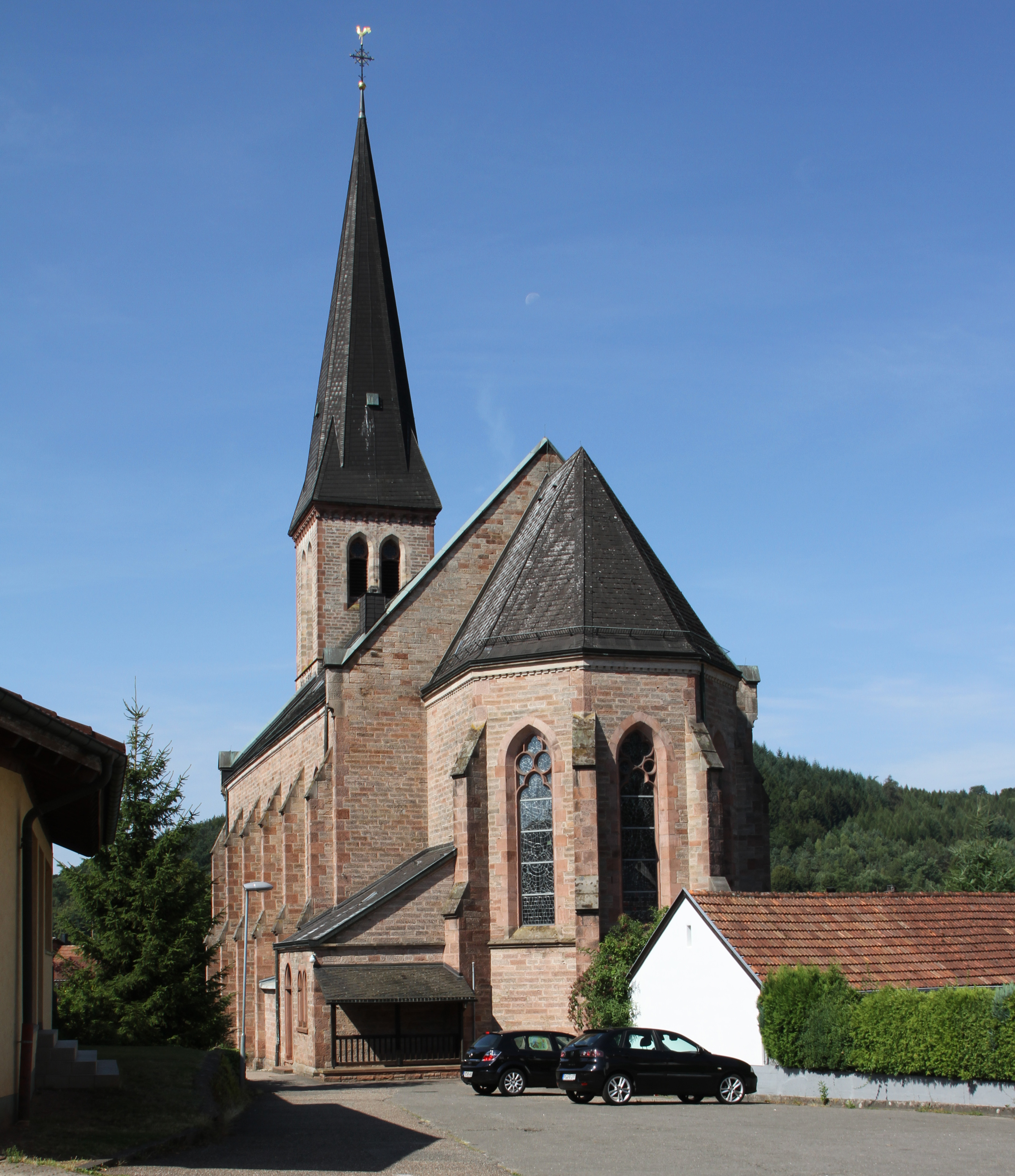
St. Georg

The first mention of Münchweiler an der Rodalben was in 1179. The village was founded by monks and relied on its religion as its focal point. Because of its poor soil quality, the area has never been able to rely on agriculture. There is some industry from logging and crafts, After the construction of the railway line between Zweibrücken and Landau in the late 1800s, the area's financial hardship lessened. The area though has little industry other than the one shoe factory to rely on. There is a nearby train tunnel that was rumored to have been used to hide artillery during the war and in the forest can be seen the remnants of an old Roman era road.

With the withdrawal of the military from Münchweiler, it has had a profound effect on the town with the closure of many businesses and a decrease in real estate values.

== US Army ==
Münchweiler once had a U.S. Army base that housed soldiers and families for the 636th Ordnance Company (EOD), the 110th MP Company, HHC 84th Ordnance Battalion and others, associated with Husterhoeh Kaserne. The main building on the base was a mirror image of the Landstuhl Regional Medical Center, with a functioning hospital. The 84th Ordnance Battalion and 636th Ordnance Company was housed on the base along with some German troops and other NATO troops.

The 330th Ordnance Company along with the 110th MP Company guarded and maintained the then classified stocks of GB and VX nerve gas located at Site 59 in Clausen. The nerve agents at Site 59, were removed under Operation Steel Box in 1990. These agents were transported by truck, rail and ship ultimately ending up at Johnston Atoll for incineration at the Johnston Atoll Chemical Agent Disposal System facility.

When the US military began to downsize in the 1990s, the small US Army posts associated with Husterhoeh Kaserne (Pirmasens) were returned to Germany, including the ones located at Maßweiler, Munchweiler, Fischbach, and Clausen. When the U.S. Army base at Münchweiler was closed, all buildings except for the base chapel were removed. The property was then sold to real estate developers, who have repurposed the former base land for a housing development, and have started building luxury residential housing.
