= Luitpold Tower =

Coordinates: 49°15′9.4″N 7°49′32.3″E

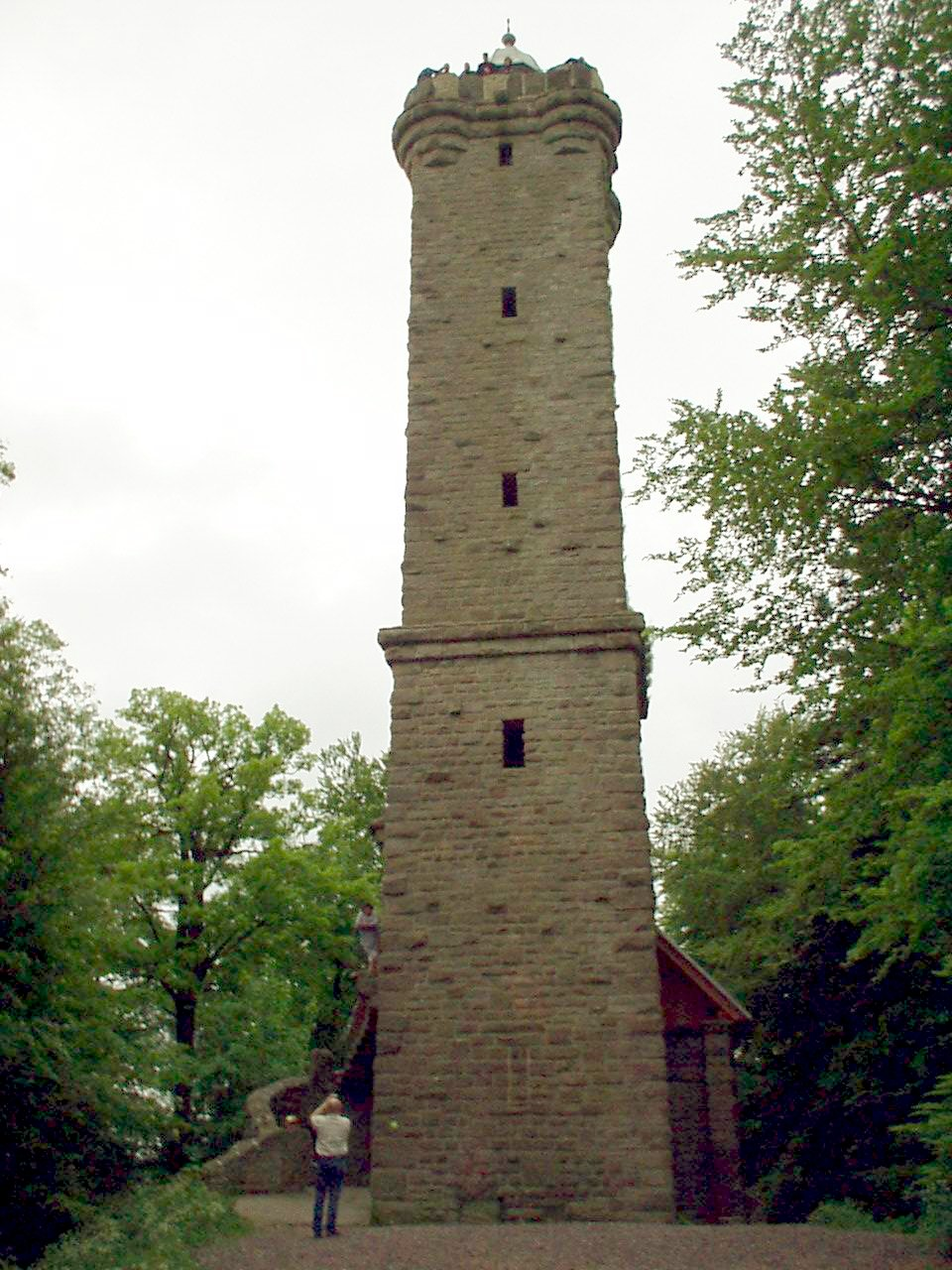
The Luitpold Tower near Hermersbergerhof

The Luitpold Tower (German: Luitpoldturm or Luitpoldsturm) was erected in 1909 on the summit of one of the highest hills in the Palatine Forest, the 610-metre-high Weißenberg as an observation tower. It is made of bunter sandstone.

== History and construction ==
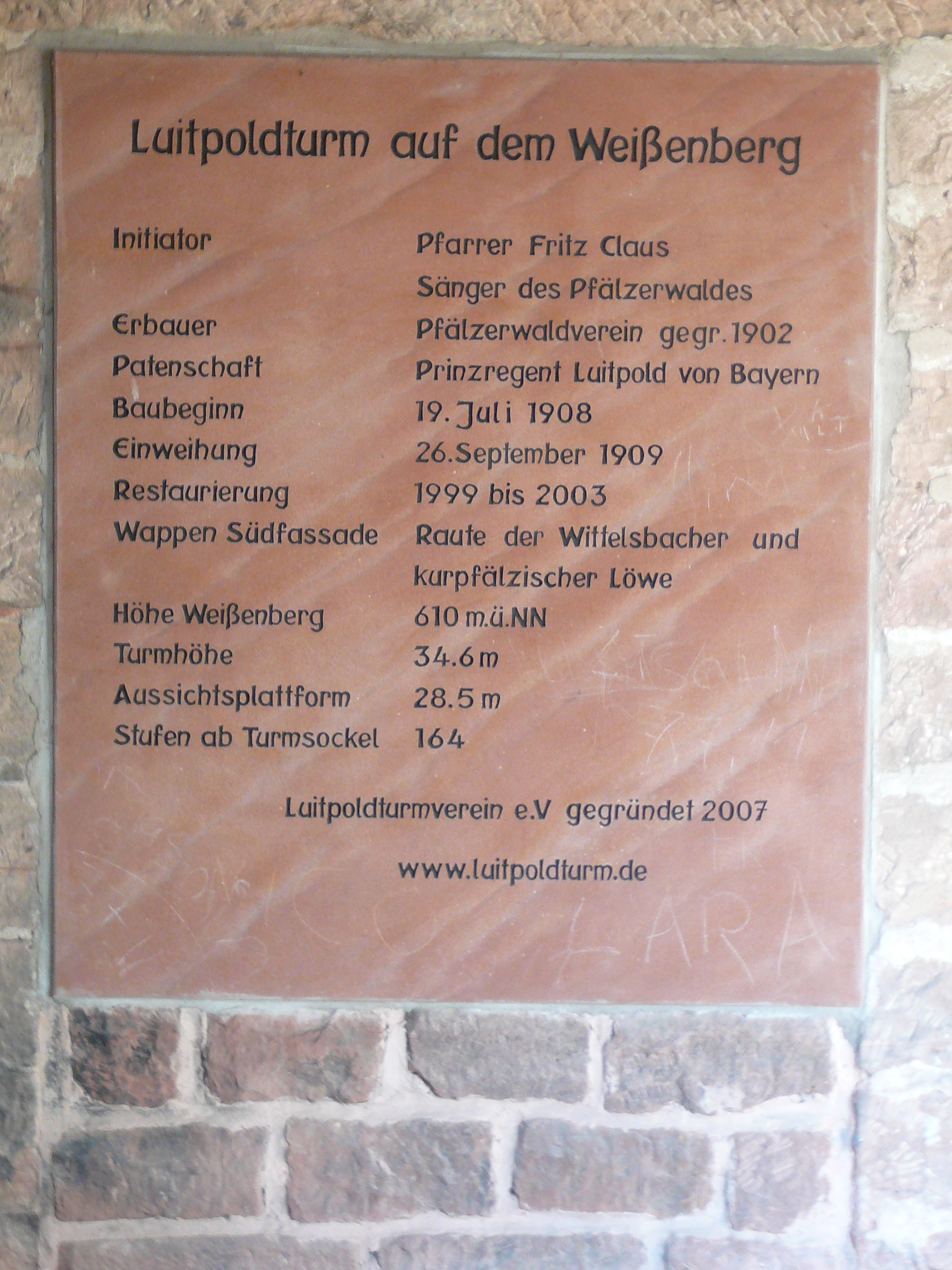
Tablet with dates and construction history of the Luitpold Tower

The idea of building a tower was conceived on 29 May 1895 at the general assembly of the Gräfenstein Conservation Society (Gräfensteiner Verschönerungsverein), a group that forestry assessor August Zwissler from Leimen had founded in 1893. It was decided to build a viewing tower on the Weißenberg costing an estimated 8,000 to 10,000 gold marks. The necessary funding would be raised by society member Martin Jäger, a well known local poet who went under the pseudonym, Fritz Claus. Thanks to his support for the tower he was able to win the Palatine Forest Club, founded in 1902 in Ludwigshafen, to his cause. The leadership of the PWV took over the coordination of the project, had the plans produced by architect Ludwig Ullmann and gathered the necessary funding, predominantly from membership subscriptions. Its name was proposed by Karl Albrecht von Ritter, the chairman of the PWV at the time; it was named after Prince Luitpold of Bavaria. In 1908 construction on the tower began and it was inaugurated on 26 September 1909. The costs came to around 23,000 gold marks, which corresponds to a sum of about €250,000 in 2000. The payment of this amount was concluded in 1911 by the Palatine Forest Club.

== Design ==
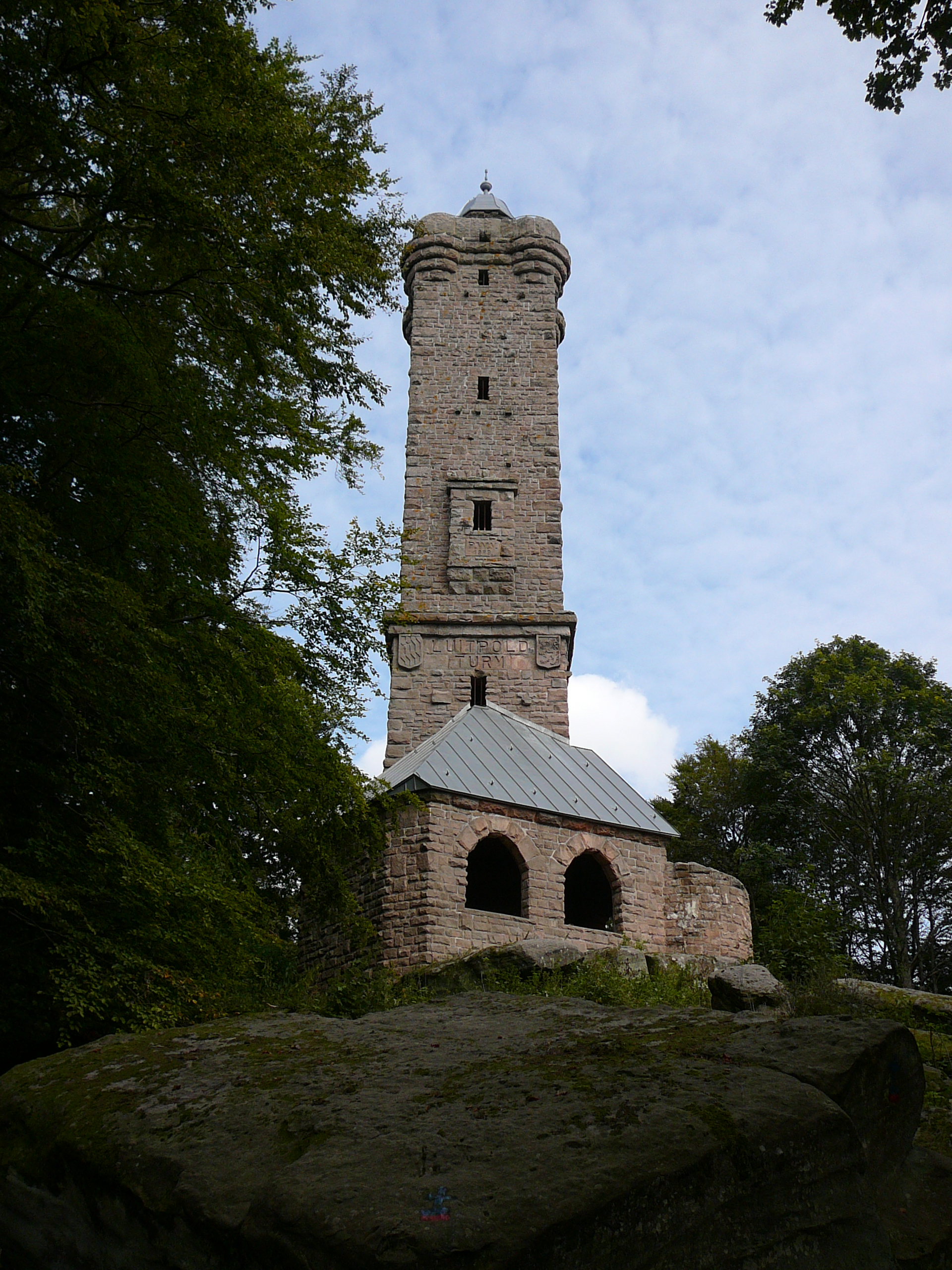
The tower seen from the south

The Luitpold Tower is a rectangular structure built of hewn sandstone blocks and comprises a perron, the actual observation tower itself and an attached building annexe The tower is 34.6 metres high, and the viewing platform is 28.5 metres above ground level. From platform level there is a further, small staircase tower with a door and slate roof.

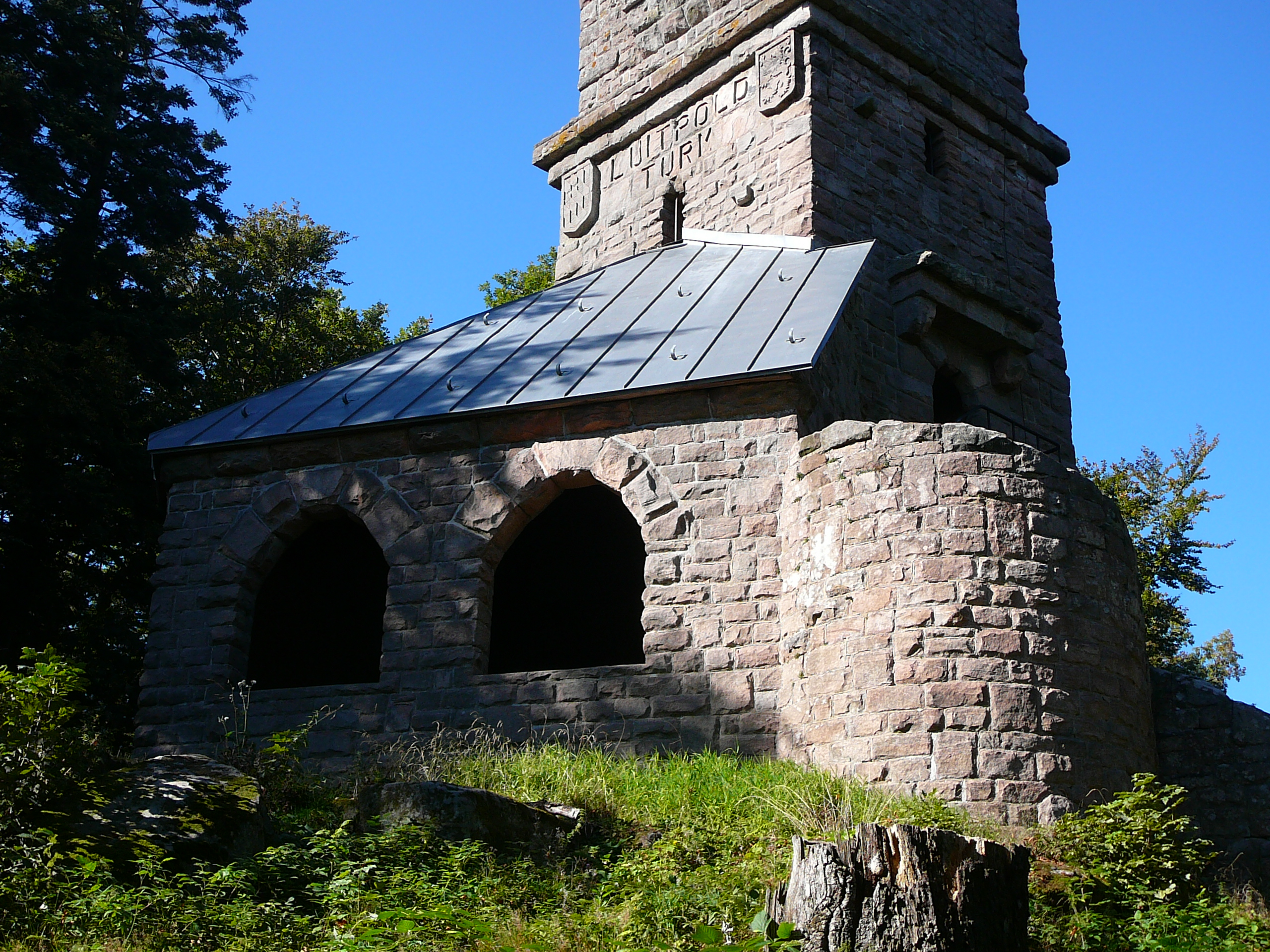
The annexe

After climbing the perron, the visitor enters a staircase tower, well-lit by multiple window openings. There are 164 steps to the observation deck. Halfway up, there is a small oriel window with a bench that can be used to rest. The upper portion of the tower is occupied by a spacious room with a relatively narrow, metallic spiral staircase in the centre, leading to the top. The visitor leaves the staircase turret through a metal door and finally enters the viewing platform, which is surrounded by a sandstone balustrade, approximately waist high, with four observation niches. In 2002, 12 tablets were mounted on this parapet at regular intervals, which point out places of interest that may be seen from the tower, both close to and in the far distance, together with distance information.

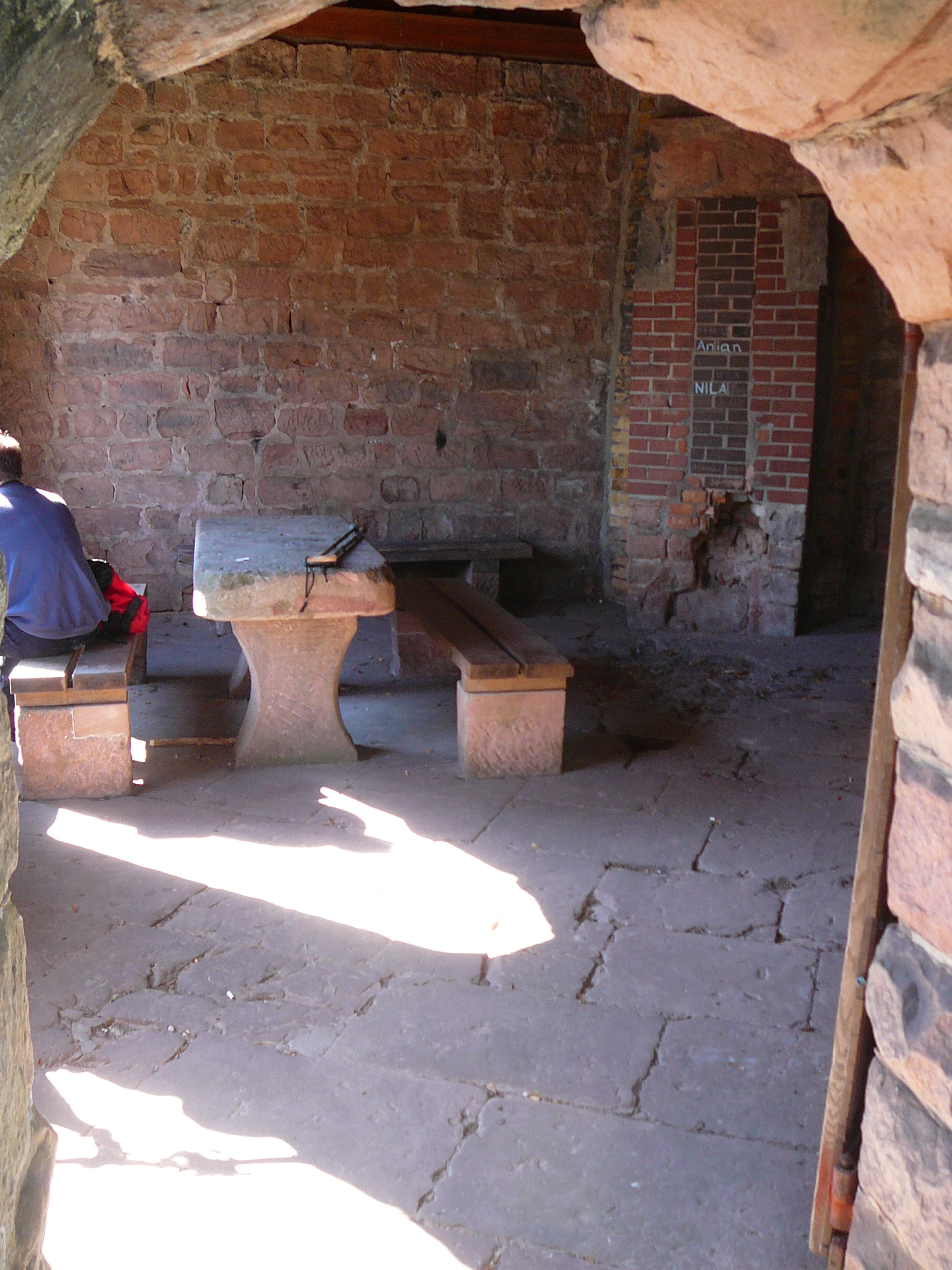
Rest room in the annexe of the Luitpold Tower

At the foot of the tower is an annexe, intended as a resting place and also as a refuge in case of inclement weather. It contains a stone table and benches, a fireplace and a plaque on which essential data about the tower and its architectural history are documented.

== Renovation and conservation ==
The building has been protected since 1993 and was thoroughly renovated in 2000 and 2001. This entailed improving the structural geometry of the tower and adding a concrete ceiling to the viewing platform. There was also no way round a modification to the iron spiral staircase and a renewal of the roof. The overall cost came to €230,000, almost the same amount originally needed for the construction of the tower. Upon completion of these renovations, the tower was opened to the public again in a ceremony on 28 August 2001.

To support the longer term maintenance of the tower, the Luitpold Tower Club (Luitpoldturmverein) was set up in 2007. Its aim is to "conserve, and where possible improve, the structural state of the tower ... to ensure free access to the tower at any time as well an unobstructed panoramic view for all ... and to keep the public aware of the tower and the extensive views that can be experienced."

== Location and views ==
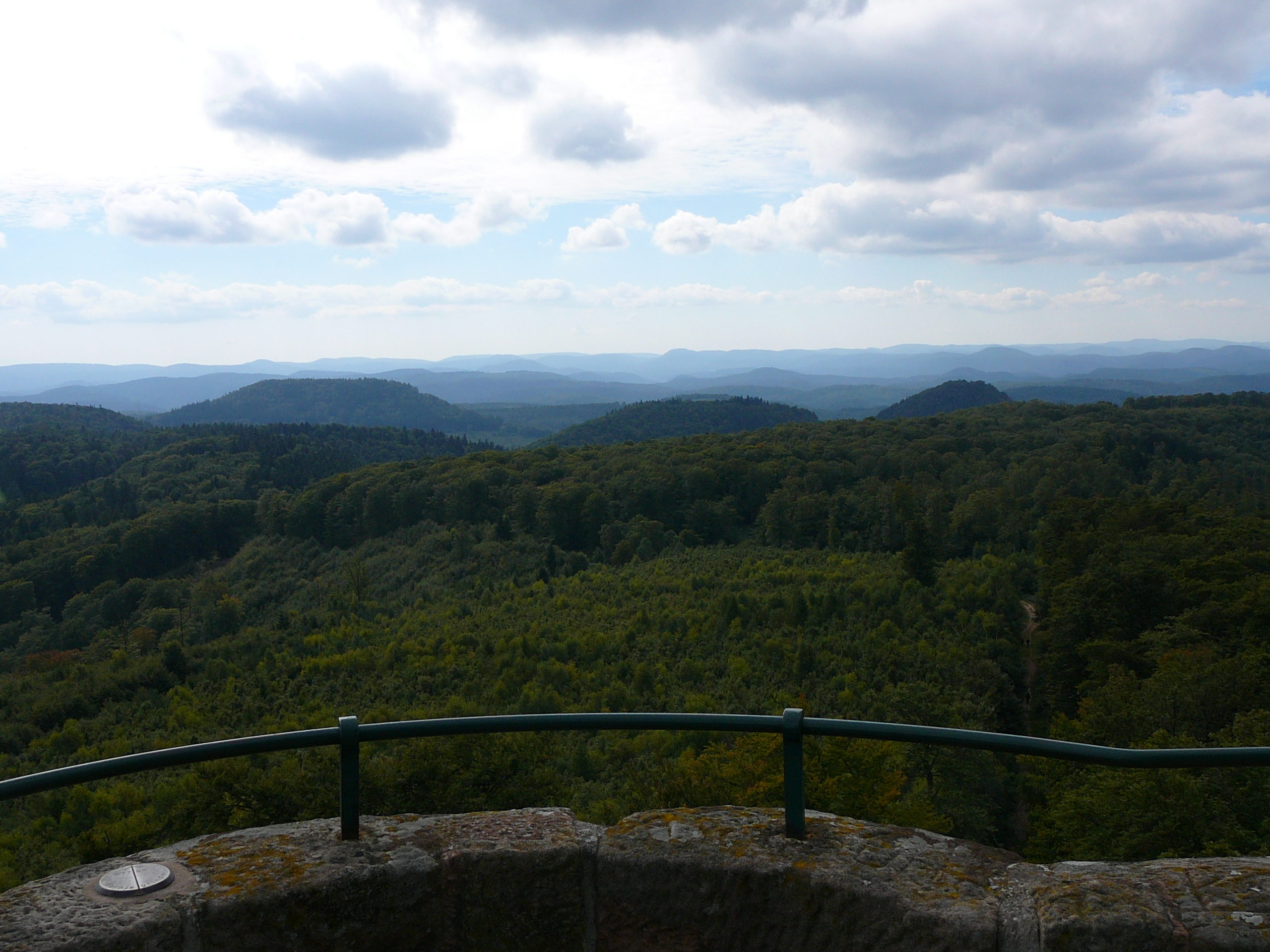
View from the Luitpold Tower looking south

The tower stands on the territory of the municipality of Merzalben in the middle of the Palatine Forest at the highest point of the Weißenberg (610 m above sea level (NN)). The tower is 1.4 kilometres from Hermersbergerhof and may be reached on foot in 10 to 20 minutes. In good weather 457 named places can be identified: in the Palatinate, in the state of Baden-Württemberg, in French Alsace and the Saarland, and the viewing platform has 12 direction tables that enable easy orientation. In good conditions, for example, the following may be seen: the Donnersberg (highest peak in the Palatinate region, 42 km distant, visibility ca. 42%), the Kalmit (highest mountain in the Palatine Forest, 20 km, visibility ca. 82%,), the Donon (highest mountain of the northern Vosges, 96 km, visibility ca. 8%) and the Hornisgrinde (highest mountain in the northern Black Forest, 77 km, visibility ca. 14%).

== Literature ==
- Winfried Lang: Herausragend im Pfälzerwald: Der Luitpoldturm und sein Panorama. Plöger, Annweiler, 2009, ISBN 978-3-89857-254-5
