= Rodalben (Verbandsgemeinde) =

Municipality in Rhineland-Palatinate, Germany

- Verbandsgemeinde
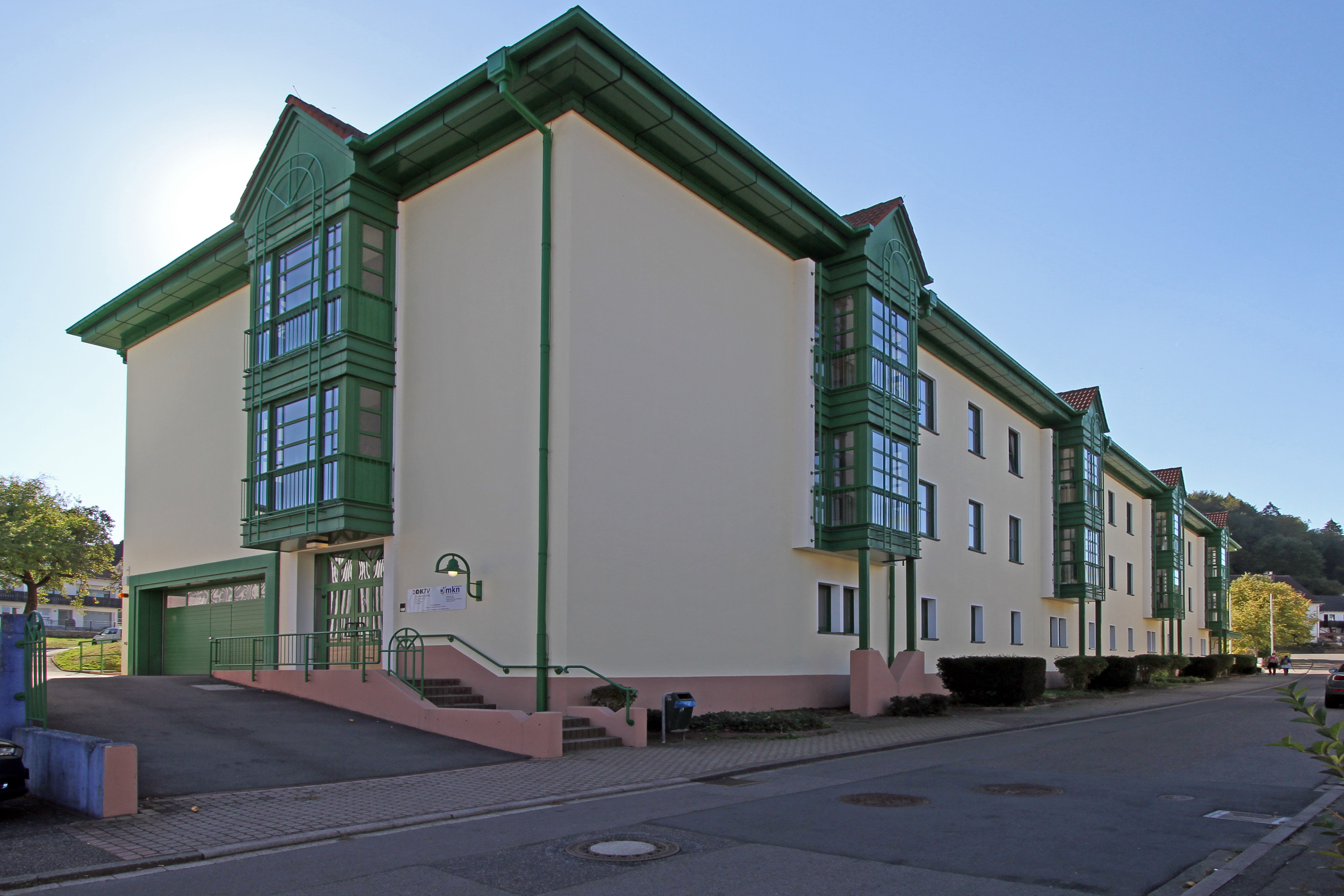
- Administration building in Rodalben

- Location of Rodalben within Südwestpfalz district
- Interactive map of Rodalben
- Location within Germany Location within Rhineland-Palatinate
- Coordinates: 49°14′N 7°39′E
- Country: Germany
- State: Rhineland-Palatinate
- District: Südwestpfalz
- Seat: Rodalben
- Subdivisions: 6 municipalities

Area
  - Total: 123.57 km^{2} (47.71 sq mi)

Population (2025-12-31)
  - Total: 13,447
  - Density: 108.82/km^{2} (281.84/sq mi)
- Time zone: UTC+01:00 (CET)
  - Summer (DST): UTC+02:00 (CEST)
- Website: www.rodalben.de

Rodalben is a Verbandsgemeinde ("collective municipality") in the Südwestpfalz district, in Rhineland-Palatinate, Germany. The seat of the municipality is in Rodalben.

The Verbandsgemeinde Rodalben consists of the following Ortsgemeinden ("local municipalities"):

1. Clausen
2. Donsieders
3. Leimen
4. Merzalben
5. Münchweiler an der Rodalb
6. Rodalben
