= Rodalben =

- Town
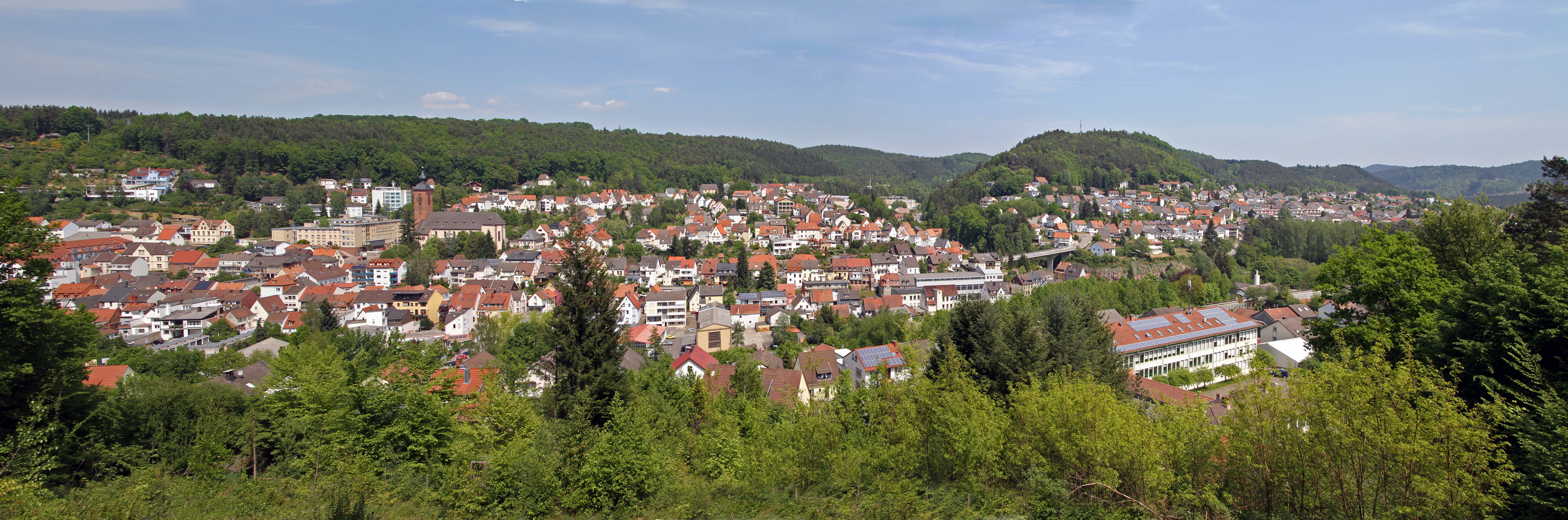

- Coat of arms

- Location of Rodalben within Südwestpfalz district
- Interactive map of Rodalben
- Location within Germany Location within Rhineland-Palatinate
- Coordinates: 49°14′N 7°39′E
- Country: Germany
- State: Rhineland-Palatinate
- District: Südwestpfalz
- Municipal assoc.: Rodalben

Government
  - Mayor (2019–24): Claus Schäfer

Area
  - Total: 15.69 km^{2} (6.06 sq mi)
- Elevation: 256 m (840 ft)

Population (2025-12-31)
  - Total: 6,339
  - Density: 404.0/km^{2} (1,046/sq mi)
- Time zone: UTC+01:00 (CET)
  - Summer (DST): UTC+02:00 (CEST)
- Postal codes: 66976
- Dialling codes: 06331
- Vehicle registration: PS
- Website: www.rodalben-stadt.de

Rodalben (German: [ˈʁoːtˌʔalbm̩]) is a municipality in the Südwestpfalz district, in Rhineland-Palatinate, Germany. It is situated in the Palatinate Forest, approx. 5 km northeast of Pirmasens.

Rodalben is the seat of the Verbandsgemeinde ("collective municipality") Rodalben. Having a population above 7000 it is the largest local authority district.

== History ==
Rodalben was founded by a Celtic tribe. In 1237 Rodalben was first mentioned as a "Meyerhof". Over the centuries mainly farmers lived there.

The origin of the name is not clarified. The suffix "alb (alben)" is a Celtic word for rivers or brooks.

=== Modern era ===
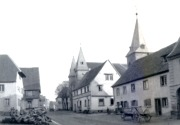
Centre of Rodalben in 1895

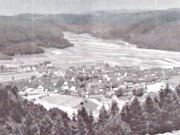
View of Rodalben in 1900

Before the Thirty Years' War 150 people lived in the Amt of Gräfenstein. By 1680, around 30 years after the war, the Amt had 30 families or inhabitants. Around 50 years later, in 1698, there were 50, of which 20 lived in Rodalben. The village grew steadily and was given greater importance by the transfer of the administration of the Gräfenstein Amt to Rodalben. Around 1720 Rodalben was given its first school. The Feine Häusel, which had been transported from Münchweiler to Rodalben and until then had been used as the vicarage, was converted into a school hall and teacher's residence. The house still exists and is used as a private dwelling.

The advent of industrialization did not stop at Rodalben. For example, the former shoemaker's trade grew into a footwear industry that increasingly determined the image of Rodalben. A separate tannery was established. After the Second World War, during the time of the German economic miracle, the shoe industry flourished. At times there were over 60 shoe factories in the town, including family businesses. With a population of nearly 6000 inhabitants, that meant one in a hundred was a shoemaker.

In 1955, Petersberg, which had hitherto been part of the parish of Rodalben, became independent. On 17 March 1963 the municipality of Rodalben was granted town rights. The opening up of global markets had a negative effect on the labour-intensive footwear industry, however, so that one shoe factory after another was forced to close. Nevertheless, the shoe remained a hallmark of the region, albeit now more through trade. On 7 June 1969 the Neuhof, part of the city of Pirmasens, with 371 inhabitants, was incorporated into Rodalben.

== Economy ==
The German Shoe Road, which still commemorates the German shoe industry, also runs through Rodalben. The economy of the town is mainly dominated today by tourism.

== People ==
- Norbert Herhammer (born 1975), politician

== Gallery ==
Rodalben

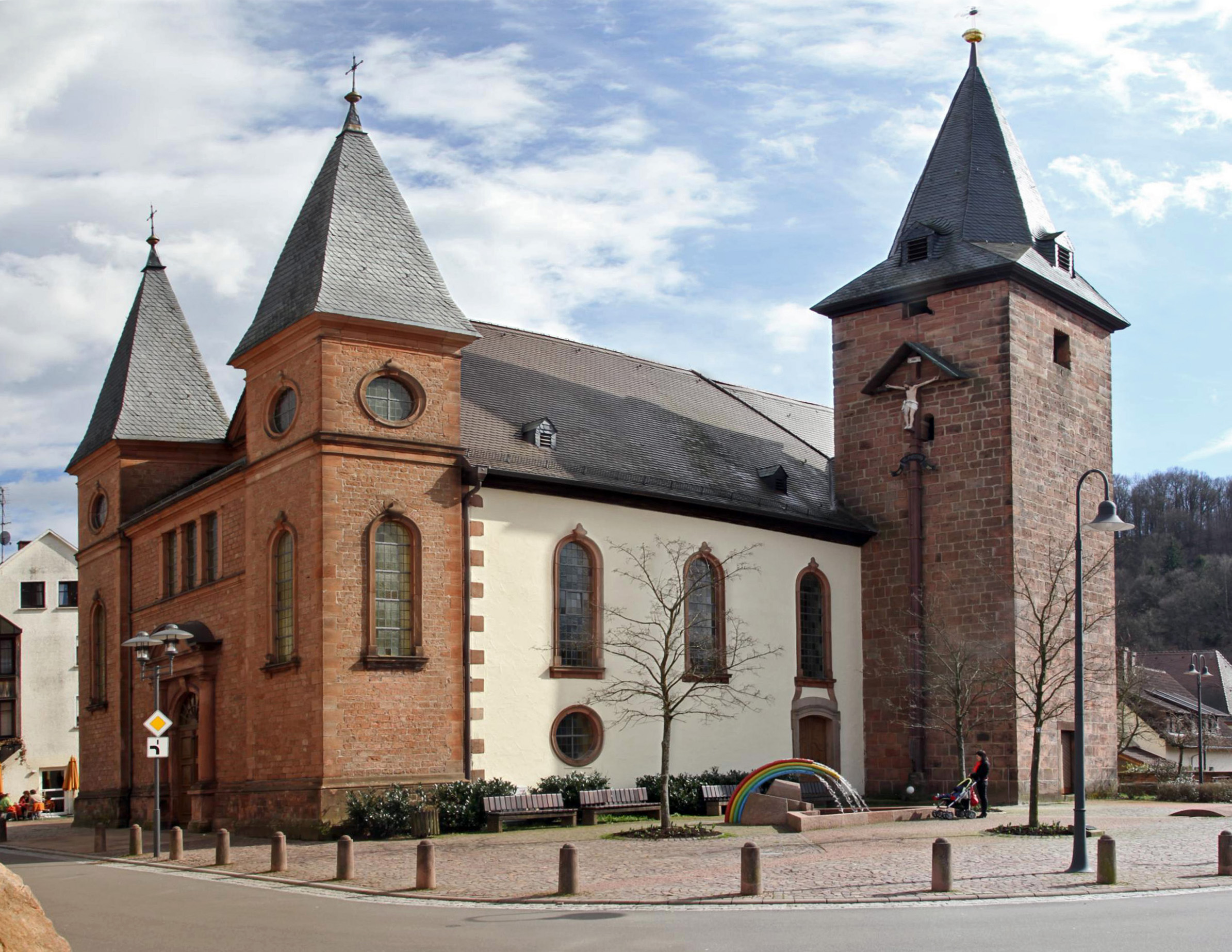

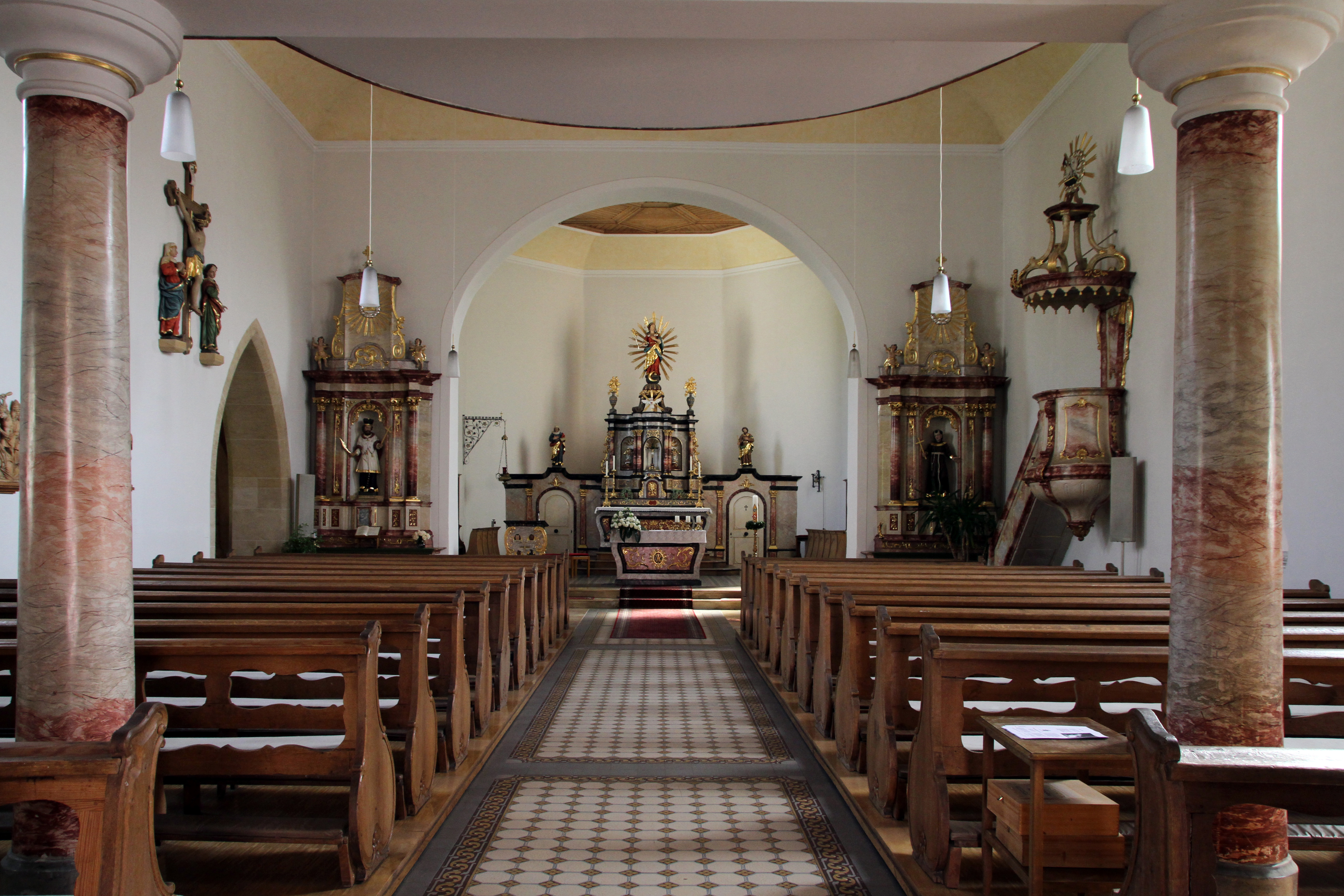

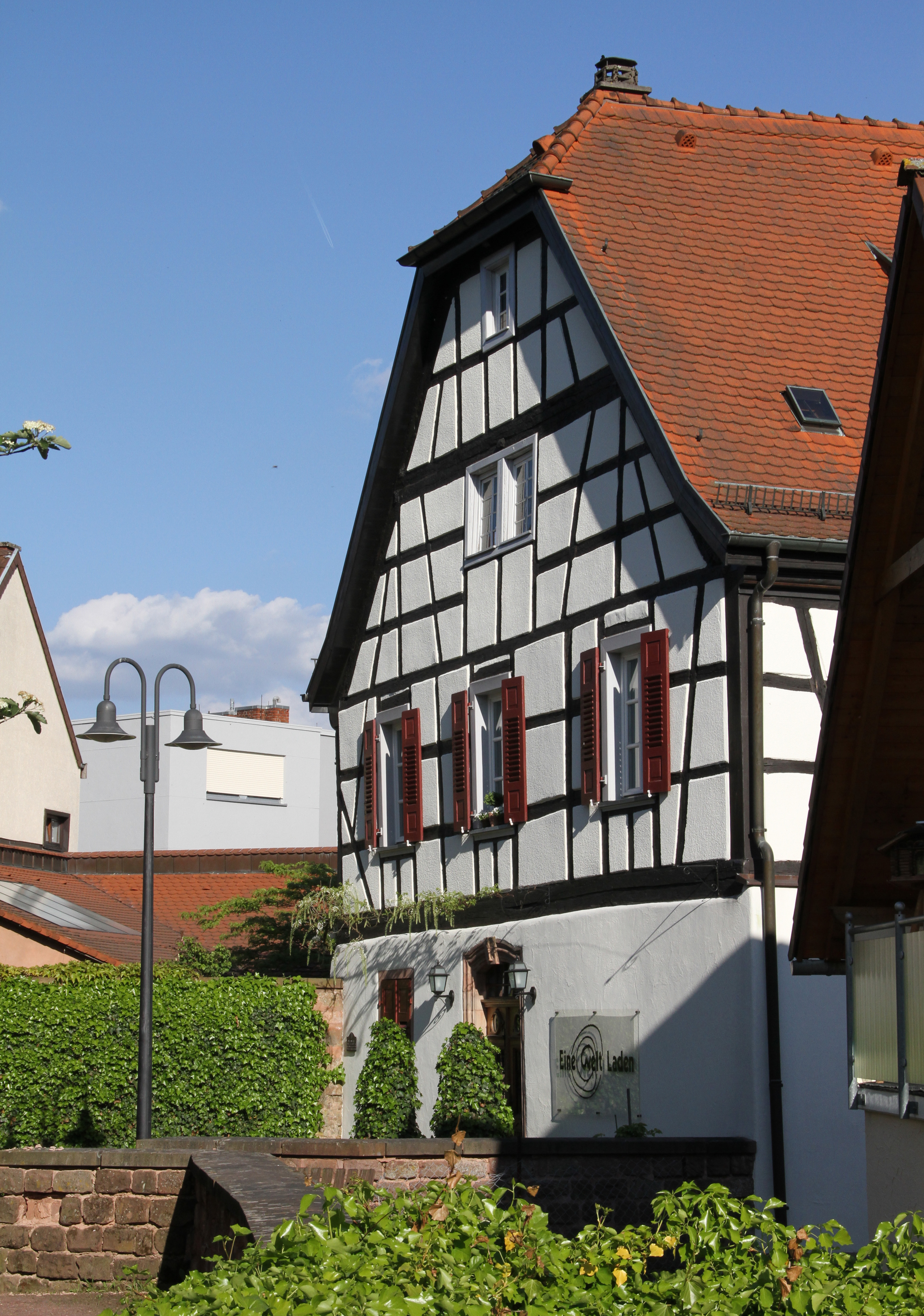

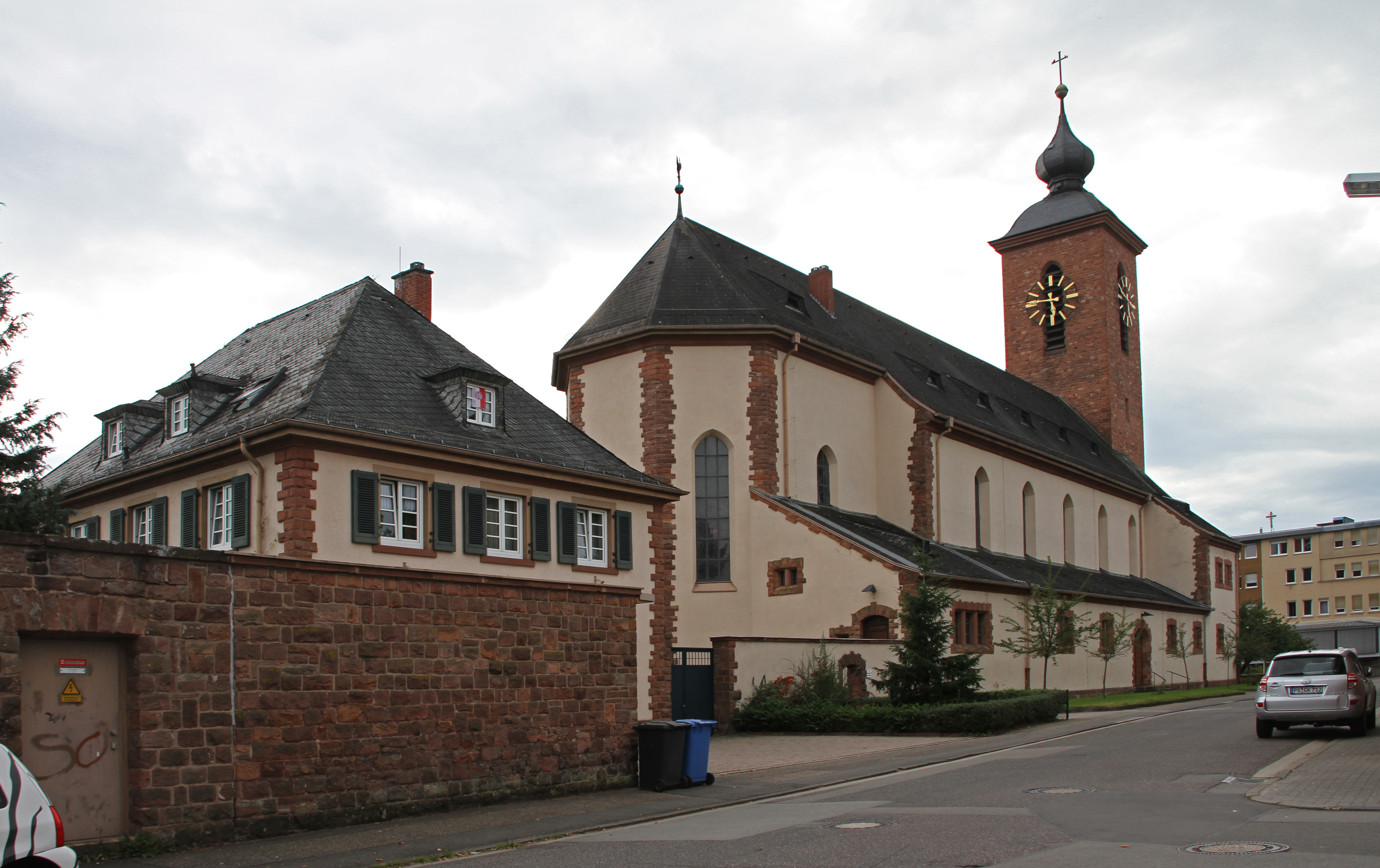

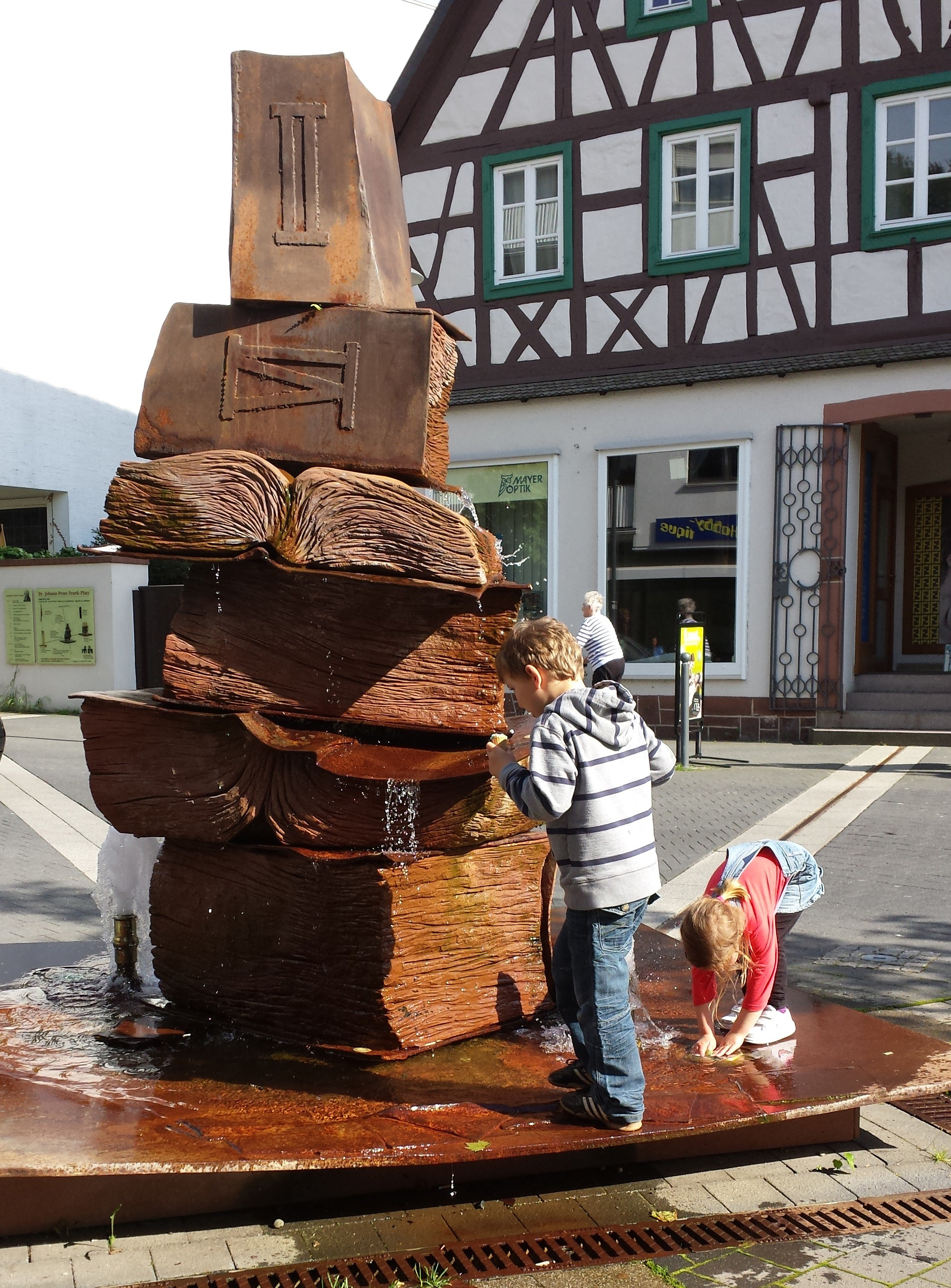

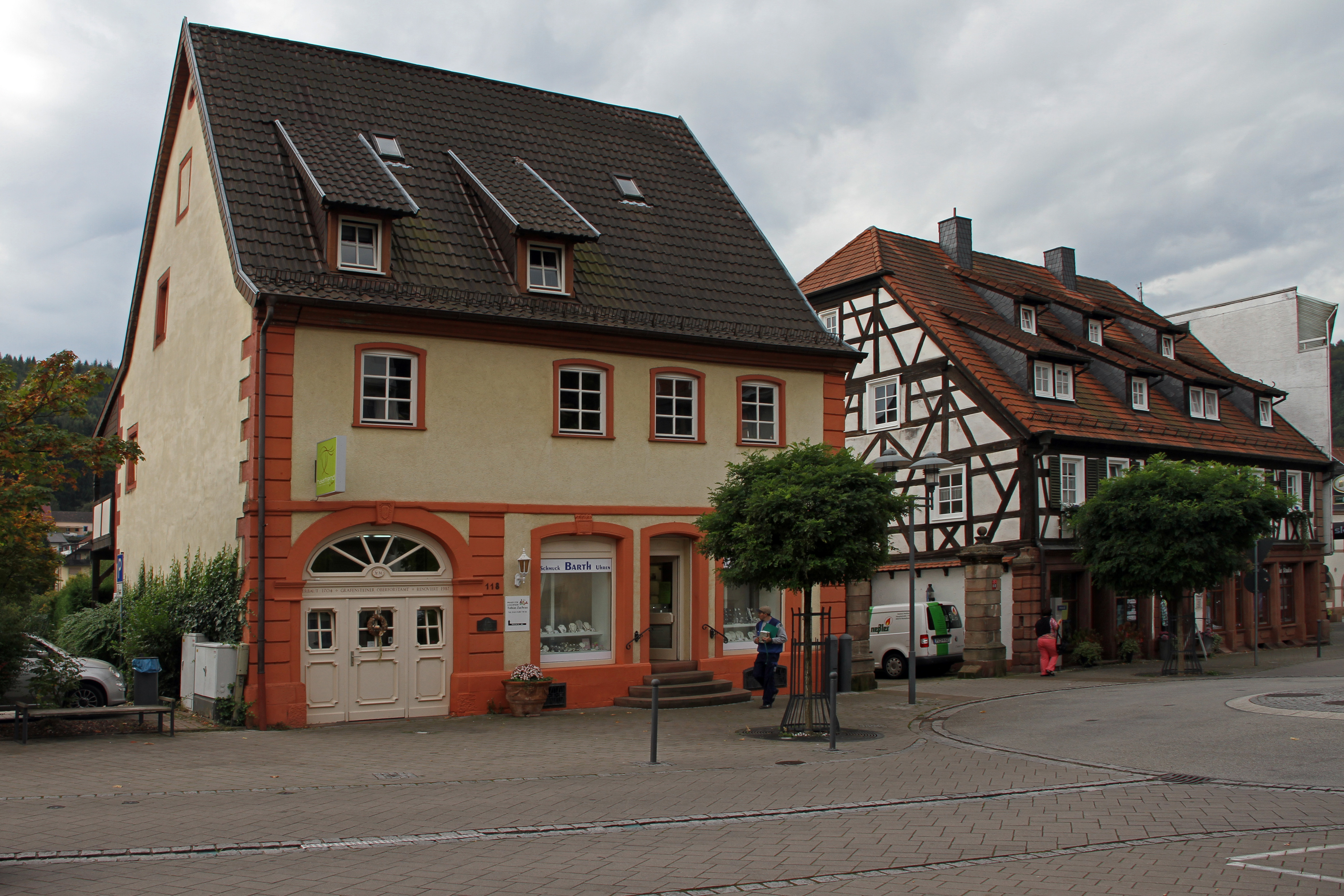

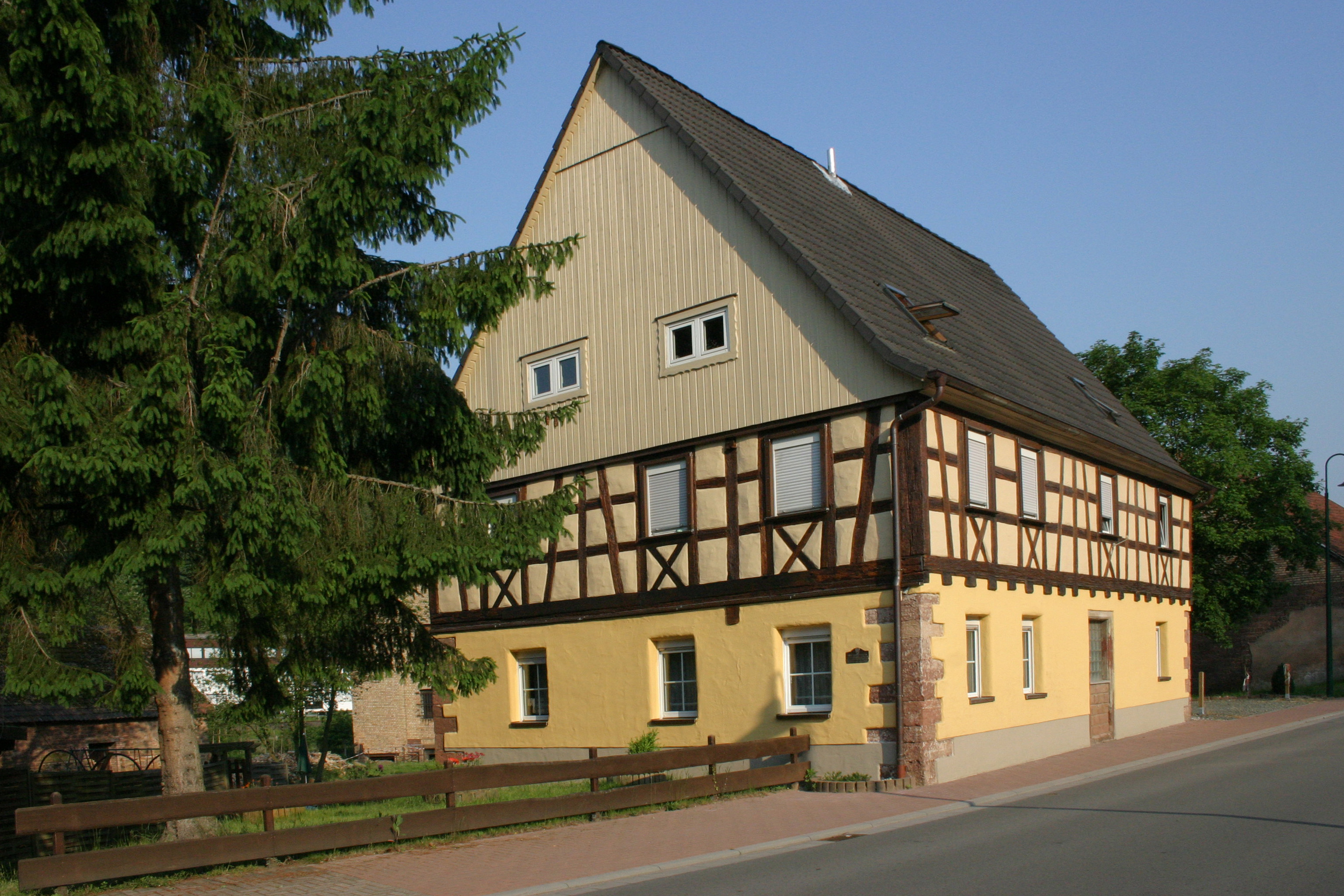

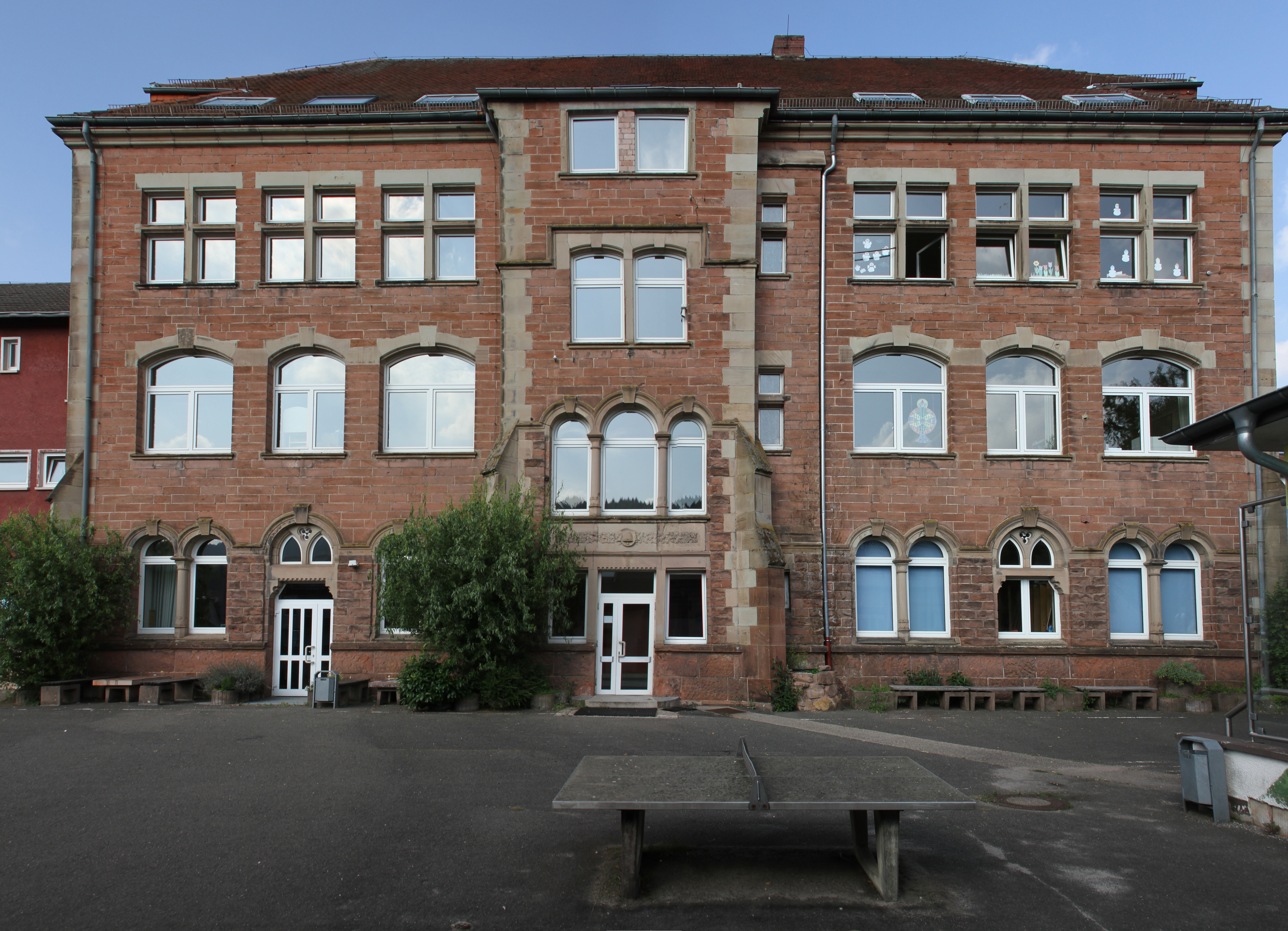
