= Höheinöd =

- Municipality
- Coat of arms

- Location of Höheinöd within Südwestpfalz district
- Interactive map of Höheinöd
- Location within Germany Location within Rhineland-Palatinate
- Coordinates: 49°17′19″N 7°36′23″E
- Country: Germany
- State: Rhineland-Palatinate
- District: Südwestpfalz
- Municipal assoc.: Waldfischbach-Burgalben

Government
  - Mayor (2019–24): Lothar Weber (SPD)

Area
  - Total: 10.87 km^{2} (4.20 sq mi)
- Elevation: 390–407 m (1,280–1,335 ft)

Population (2025-12-31)
  - Total: 1,152
  - Density: 106.0/km^{2} (274.5/sq mi)
- Time zone: UTC+01:00 (CET)
  - Summer (DST): UTC+02:00 (CEST)
- Postal codes: 66989
- Dialling codes: 06333
- Vehicle registration: PS
- Website: www.hoeheinoed.de

Höheinöd (Palatine German: Hehäned) is a municipality in the Südwestpfalz district of Rhineland-Palatinate, Germany. It belongs to the Waldfischbach-Burgalben municipal association.
