= Schmalenberg =

- Municipality
- Coat of arms

- Location of Schmalenberg within Südwestpfalz district
- Interactive map of Schmalenberg
- Location within Germany Location within Rhineland-Palatinate
- Coordinates: 49°19′6″N 7°43′5″E
- Country: Germany
- State: Rhineland-Palatinate
- District: Südwestpfalz
- Municipal assoc.: Waldfischbach-Burgalben

Government
  - Mayor (2019–24): Peter Seibert

Area
  - Total: 10.39 km^{2} (4.01 sq mi)
- Elevation: 420–447 m (1,378–1,467 ft)

Population (2025-12-31)
  - Total: 748
  - Density: 72.0/km^{2} (186/sq mi)
- Time zone: UTC+01:00 (CET)
  - Summer (DST): UTC+02:00 (CEST)
- Postal codes: 67718
- Dialling codes: 06307
- Vehicle registration: PS

Schmalenberg (German pronunciation: [ˈʃmaːlənbɛʁk]; Palatine German: Schmaleberg) is a municipality in Südwestpfalz district, in Rhineland-Palatinate, western Germany and belongs to the municipal association Waldfischbach-Burgalben.
