= Heltersberg =

- Municipality
- Coat of arms

- Location of Heltersberg within Südwestpfalz district
- Interactive map of Heltersberg
- Location within Germany Location within Rhineland-Palatinate
- Coordinates: 49°18′54″N 7°42′55″E
- Country: Germany
- State: Rhineland-Palatinate
- District: Südwestpfalz
- Municipal assoc.: Waldfischbach-Burgalben

Government
  - Mayor (2019–24): Ralf Mohrhardt (SPD)

Area
  - Total: 28.15 km^{2} (10.87 sq mi)
- Elevation: 415–440 m (1,362–1,444 ft)

Population (2025-12-31)
  - Total: 1,847
  - Density: 65.61/km^{2} (169.9/sq mi)
- Time zone: UTC+01:00 (CET)
  - Summer (DST): UTC+02:00 (CEST)
- Postal codes: 67716
- Dialling codes: 06333
- Vehicle registration: PS
- Website: www.heltersberg.de

Heltersberg (German pronunciation: [ˈhɛltɐsbɛʁk]; Palatine German: Helderschberg) is a municipality in Südwestpfalz district, in Rhineland-Palatinate, western Germany and belongs to the municipal association Waldfischbach-Burgalben.
