= Hermersberg =

- Municipality
- Coat of arms

- Location of Hermersberg within Südwestpfalz district
- Interactive map of Hermersberg
- Location within Germany Location within Rhineland-Palatinate
- Coordinates: 49°19′23″N 7°38′02″E
- Country: Germany
- State: Rhineland-Palatinate
- District: Südwestpfalz
- Municipal assoc.: Waldfischbach-Burgalben

Government
  - Mayor (2019–24): Erich Sommer (CDU)

Area
  - Total: 13.02 km^{2} (5.03 sq mi)
- Elevation: 408–427 m (1,339–1,401 ft)

Population (2025-12-31)
  - Total: 1,684
  - Density: 129.3/km^{2} (335.0/sq mi)
- Time zone: UTC+01:00 (CET)
  - Summer (DST): UTC+02:00 (CEST)
- Postal codes: 66919
- Dialling codes: 06333
- Vehicle registration: PS
- Website: www.hermersberg.de

Hermersberg (Palatine German: Hermerschberch) is a municipality in Südwestpfalz district, in Rhineland-Palatinate, western Germany and belongs to the municipal association Waldfischbach-Burgalben. It is situated on the western edge of the Palatinate Forest, approx. 15 km northeast of Pirmasens, on top of the Sickingen Heights, and biggest settlement on top.

== Inhabitants ==
69% of the population in Hermersberg is Catholic, 23% are Protestants; the evolution of population can be proven since 1800. From Year 1970 the number of inhabitants is slowly decreasing.

Evolution of population (since 1800):

Year	1800	1815	1835	1871	1905	1925	1933	1939	1950	1961	1970	1980	1990	2000	2006	2008	2010
Population	239	435	611	794	1.096	1.211	1.343	1.459	1.556	1.755	1.932	1.877	1.830	1.813	1.740	1.726	1.733
