= Battweiler =

- Municipality
- Coat of arms

- Location of Battweiler within Südwestpfalz district
- Interactive map of Battweiler
- Location within Germany Location within Rhineland-Palatinate
- Coordinates: 49°16′34″N 7°27′49″E
- Country: Germany
- State: Rhineland-Palatinate
- District: Südwestpfalz
- Municipal assoc.: Zweibrücken-Land

Government
  - Mayor (2019–24): Werner Veith (SPD)

Area
  - Total: 5.67 km^{2} (2.19 sq mi)
- Elevation: 310 m (1,020 ft)

Population (2025-12-31)
  - Total: 625
  - Density: 110/km^{2} (285/sq mi)
- Time zone: UTC+01:00 (CET)
  - Summer (DST): UTC+02:00 (CEST)
- Postal codes: 66484
- Dialling codes: 06337
- Vehicle registration: PS
- Website: www.vgzwland.de

Battweiler (German pronunciation: [ˈbatvaɪlɐ]) is a municipality in Südwestpfalz district, in Rhineland-Palatinate, western Germany.
