= Althornbach =

- Municipality
- Coat of arms

- Location of Althornbach within Südwestpfalz district
- Interactive map of Althornbach
- Location within Germany Location within Rhineland-Palatinate
- Coordinates: 49°11′49″N 7°23′0″E
- Country: Germany
- State: Rhineland-Palatinate
- District: Südwestpfalz
- Municipal assoc.: Zweibrücken-Land

Government
  - Mayor (2019–24): Bernd Kipp

Area
  - Total: 5.59 km^{2} (2.16 sq mi)
- Elevation: 250 m (820 ft)

Population (2025-12-31)
  - Total: 640
  - Density: 110/km^{2} (300/sq mi)
- Time zone: UTC+01:00 (CET)
  - Summer (DST): UTC+02:00 (CEST)
- Postal codes: 66484
- Dialling codes: 06338
- Vehicle registration: PS
- Website: www.gemeinde-althornbach.de

Althornbach is a municipality in Südwestpfalz district, in Rhineland-Palatinate, western Germany.
