= Südwestpfalz =

Coordinates: 49.21231°N 7.61788°E

- District
- Flag Coat of arms
- Country: Germany
- State: Rhineland-Palatinate
- Capital: Pirmasens

Government
  - District admin.: Susanne Ganster (CDU)

Area
  - Total: 953.76 km^{2} (368.25 sq mi)

Population (31 December 2025)
  - Total: 89,402
  - Density: 93.736/km^{2} (242.78/sq mi)
- Time zone: UTC+01:00 (CET)
  - Summer (DST): UTC+02:00 (CEST)
- Vehicle registration: PS, ZW
- Website: lksuedwestpfalz.de

Südwestpfalz (pronounced [zyːtˈvɛstˌpfalts], lit. 'Southwest Palatinate') is a district (Kreis or more precise Landkreis) in the south of Rhineland-Palatinate, Germany. Neighboring districts are (from west clockwise) Saarpfalz, the district-free city Zweibrücken, the districts Kaiserslautern and Bad Dürkheim, the district-free city Landau (the Taubensuhl/Fassendeich forest part of the city), Südliche Weinstraße, and the French département Bas-Rhin. The district-free city Pirmasens is surrounded by the district.

== History ==
The district was created 18 February 1818 as the Landkommisariat Pirmasens. During the communal reforms of 1968–72, several changes were made to the district. In 1969, the neighboring district Bad Bergzabern was dissolved and some part of it was added, while other municipalities were incorporated into the city Pirmasens. In 1972, the district Landkreis Zweibrücken was dissolved and added into the district Landkreis Pirmasens, which on 1 January 1997 renamed itself to Südwestpfalz.

== Geography ==
The district is located in the hills of the Palatinate, the Palatinate Forest. The river Lauter has its spring near the city of Pirmasens.

== Coat of arms ==
The three red bars on golden ground in the left half is the coat of arms of Hanau-Lichtenberg, while the lion in the right half is the lion of the Electorate of the Palatinate. These mark the two historic states which were located on the district's area until the end of the 18th century.

== Towns and municipalities ==
Verbandsgemeinden
1. Dahner Felsenland; 1. Bobenthal; 2. Bruchweiler-Bärenbach; 3. Bundenthal; 4. Busenberg; 5. Dahn^{1, 2}; 6. Erfweiler; 7. Erlenbach bei Dahn; 8. Fischbach bei Dahn; 9. Hirschthal; 10. Ludwigswinkel; 11. Niederschlettenbach; 12. Nothweiler; 13. Rumbach; 14. Schindhard; 15. Schönau; 2. Hauenstein; 1. Darstein; 2. Dimbach; 3. Hauenstein^{1}; 4. Hinterweidenthal; 5. Lug; 6. Schwanheim; 7. Spirkelbach; 8. Wilgartswiesen; 3. Pirmasens-Land [seat: Pirmasens]; 1. Bottenbach; 2. Eppenbrunn; 3. Hilst; 4. Kröppen; 5. Lemberg; 6. Obersimten; 7. Ruppertsweiler; 8. Schweix; 9. Trulben; 10. Vinningen	4. Rodalben; 1. Clausen; 2. Donsieders; 3. Leimen; 4. Merzalben; 5. Münchweiler an der Rodalb; 6. Rodalben^{1, 2}; 5. Thaleischweiler-Wallhalben; 1. Biedershausen; 2. Herschberg; 3. Hettenhausen; 4. Höheischweiler; 5. Höhfröschen; 6. Knopp-Labach; 7. Krähenberg; 8. Maßweiler; 9. Nünschweiler; 10. Obernheim-Kirchenarnbach; 11. Petersberg; 12. Reifenberg; 13. Rieschweiler-Mühlbach; 14. Saalstadt; 15. Schauerberg; 16. Schmitshausen; 17. Thaleischweiler-Fröschen^{1}; 18. Wallhalben; 19. Weselberg; 20. Winterbach	6. Waldfischbach-Burgalben; 1. Geiselberg; 2. Heltersberg; 3. Hermersberg; 4. Höheinöd; 5. Horbach; 6. Schmalenberg; 7. Steinalben; 8. Waldfischbach-Burgalben^{1}; 7. Zweibrücken-Land [seat: Zweibrücken]; 1. Althornbach; 2. Battweiler; 3. Bechhofen; 4. Contwig; 5. Dellfeld; 6. Dietrichingen; 7. Großbundenbach; 8. Großsteinhausen; 9. Hornbach^{2}; 10. Käshofen; 11. Kleinbundenbach; 12. Kleinsteinhausen; 13. Mauschbach; 14. Riedelberg; 15. Rosenkopf; 16. Walshausen; 17. Wiesbach
^{1}seat of the Verbandsgemeinde; ^{2}town
