= Zweibrücken-Land =

- Verbandsgemeinde
- Location of Zweibrücken-Land within Südwestpfalz district
- Interactive map of Zweibrücken-Land
- Location within Germany Location within Rhineland-Palatinate
- Coordinates: 49°15′N 7°22′E
- Country: Germany
- State: Rhineland-Palatinate
- District: Südwestpfalz
- Seat: Zweibrücken
- Subdivisions: 17 municipalities

Area
  - Total: 124.69 km^{2} (48.14 sq mi)

Population (2025-12-31)
  - Total: 15,265
  - Density: 122.42/km^{2} (317.08/sq mi)
- Time zone: UTC+01:00 (CET)
  - Summer (DST): UTC+02:00 (CEST)
- Website: www.vgzwland.de

Zweibrücken-Land is a Verbandsgemeinde ("collective municipality") in the Südwestpfalz district, in Rhineland-Palatinate, Germany. It is situated on the southwestern edge of the Palatinate Forest, around Zweibrücken. The seat of the municipality is in Zweibrücken, itself not part of the municipality.

== Composition ==
The Verbandsgemeinde Zweibrücken-Land consists of the following Ortsgemeinden ("local municipalities"):

1. Althornbach
2. Battweiler
3. Bechhofen
4. Contwig
5. Dellfeld
6. Dietrichingen
7. Großbundenbach
8. Großsteinhausen
9. Hornbach
10. Käshofen
11. Kleinbundenbach
12. Kleinsteinhausen
13. Mauschbach
14. Riedelberg
15. Rosenkopf
16. Walshausen
17. Wiesbach

== Politics ==
The municipal mayor is elected every 8 years, and was held by Jürgen Gundacker (SPD) from 2012 to 2020, and by Björn Bernhard (CDU) since 2020.
