= Kleinbundenbach =

- Municipality
- Coat of arms

- Location of Kleinbundenbach within Südwestpfalz district
- Interactive map of Kleinbundenbach
- Location within Germany Location within Rhineland-Palatinate
- Coordinates: 49°18′39″N 7°26′23″E
- Country: Germany
- State: Rhineland-Palatinate
- District: Südwestpfalz
- Municipal assoc.: Zweibrücken-Land

Government
  - Mayor (2019–24): Manfred Gerlinger

Area
  - Total: 5.00 km^{2} (1.93 sq mi)
- Elevation: 350 m (1,150 ft)

Population (2025-12-31)
  - Total: 425
  - Density: 85.0/km^{2} (220/sq mi)
- Time zone: UTC+01:00 (CET)
  - Summer (DST): UTC+02:00 (CEST)
- Postal codes: 66501
- Dialling codes: 06337
- Vehicle registration: PS
- Website: www.kleinbundenbach.de

Kleinbundenbach is a municipality in Südwestpfalz district, in Rhineland-Palatinate, western Germany.
