= Contwig =

- Municipality
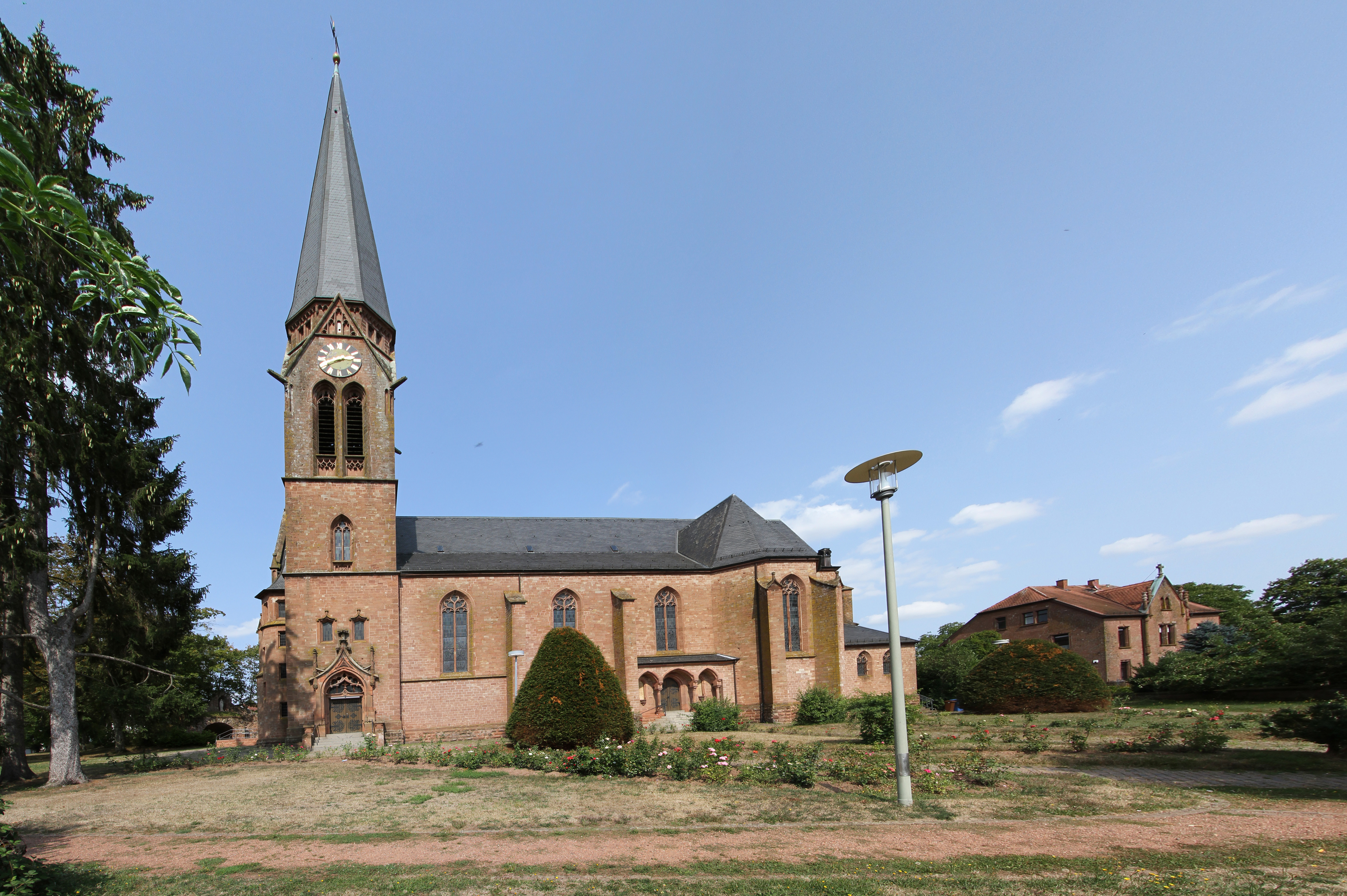
- Church of Saint Lawrence

- Coat of arms

- Location of Contwig within Südwestpfalz district
- Interactive map of Contwig
- Location within Germany Location within Rhineland-Palatinate
- Coordinates: 49°15′05″N 7°25′40″E
- Country: Germany
- State: Rhineland-Palatinate
- District: Südwestpfalz
- Municipal assoc.: Zweibrücken-Land

Government
  - Mayor (2021–26): Nadine Brinette (CDU)

Area
  - Total: 24.73 km^{2} (9.55 sq mi)
- Elevation: 242 m (794 ft)

Population (2025-12-31)
  - Total: 4,303
  - Density: 174.0/km^{2} (450.7/sq mi)
- Time zone: UTC+01:00 (CET)
  - Summer (DST): UTC+02:00 (CEST)
- Postal codes: 66497
- Dialling codes: 06332
- Vehicle registration: PS
- Website: www.gemeinde-contwig.de

Contwig (German pronunciation: [ˈkɔntvɪç]) is a municipality in Südwestpfalz district, in Rhineland-Palatinate, western Germany. It has slightly over 5.000 inhabitants, and is part of the Verbandsgemeinde Zweibrücken-Land. Its current mayor is Nadine Brinette, elected in 2021.
