= Wiesbach, Germany =

Wiesbach
- Municipality
- Coat of arms

- Location of Wiesbach within Südwestpfalz district
- Interactive map of Wiesbach
- Location within Germany Location within Rhineland-Palatinate
- Coordinates: 49°20′00″N 7°27′12″E
- Country: Germany
- State: Rhineland-Palatinate
- District: Südwestpfalz
- Municipal assoc.: Zweibrücken-Land

Government
  - Mayor (2019–24): Klaus Buchmann

Area
  - Total: 4.07 km^{2} (1.57 sq mi)
- Elevation: 260 m (850 ft)

Population (2025-12-31)
  - Total: 466
  - Density: 114/km^{2} (297/sq mi)
- Time zone: UTC+01:00 (CET)
  - Summer (DST): UTC+02:00 (CEST)
- Postal codes: 66894
- Dialling codes: 06337
- Vehicle registration: PS or ZW
- Website: www.wiesbach-pfalz.de

Wiesbach (German pronunciation: [ˈviːsbax]) is a municipality in Südwestpfalz district, in Rhineland-Palatinate, in the southwest of Germany. The place name is composed of the two German words for meadow (German: Wiese) and brook (German: Bach).

== Geography ==
Wiesbach lies in a depression of the Sickingen Heights (German: Sickinger Höhe) at the confluence of several streams called 'Wiesbach'. The surrounding, partly gorge-like valleys are wooded, while the heights are covered by farmland.

== History ==
Wiesbach was first mentioned in 1269 as Reichsdorf Wisebach. In 1297 a castle is mentioned. 1564 was next to Grundt Wisenbach a Neuwen Wisebach on the slope of so-called crows mountain (German: Krähenberg), which later became a self-governing village under the name Krähenberg. Around 1759 a large area was given to the new village Rosenkopf, which was settled from 1715.

As late as 1608 before the Thirty Years' War 110 people lived in Wiesbach (16 men, 15 women, 68 children, 11 servants and maids). The years between 1635 and 1638 were the worst years of Wiesbach in Thirty Years' War. In the whole area was fought and looted. There were still 6 families living in Wiesbach. After the end of Thirty Years' War, many families from Tyrol, Switzerland, the Allgäu and Lorraine immigrated until 1670. Already in 1688 lived again 19 family in Wiesbach.

Wiesbach belonged until 1589 to the House of Sickingen at Nanstein Castle in Landstuhl and then came to Palatine Zweibrücken, where it remained until the end of the 18th century. In 1920 it changed from Landkreis Homburg to Landkreis Zweibrücken. Soldiers of the Régiment de Royal Deux-Ponts (Deux-Ponts is French for Zweibrücken) fought in 1781 at the battle of Yorktown on the side of the French-American troops under the command of Comte de Rochambeau and George Washington against the British army. By this decisive Franco-American victory, the Britons recognized American independence.

Zweibrücken belonged to Bavaria until the end of World War II.

In the 19th century, many Wiesbachers emigrated to the United States from America. Typical last names are:

- Hemmer
- Kleis
- Jung
- Maurer

== Population statistics ==
date	Male	Female	total
2017	269	239	530
2005	292	290	624
1742	130	129	259
1688			19 Families
1635			6 Families
1608			110

== Coat of arms ==
In four-part shield right above in black five silver balls 2: 1: 2, top left in silver a red mill wheel, right down in gold a red oblique crozier and bottom left in black a golden lion with red claws and tongue. It was awarded in 1982 by the District Government of Rheinhessen-Pfalz.

The five cannonballs symbolize the weapons of Franz von Sickingen. The mill wheel stands for the numerous water mills of the area in former times. The staff represents Saint Pirminius. The Palatine Lion is also in the coat of arms of Rhineland-Palatinate.

== Buildings ==
- Castle: "The Castle Wiesbach, of which not even the name is known, is said to have originated between 1125 and 1250. The at least two-storey castle complex probably served as the Reichsministerial headquarters. "(Friedrich Weber, Wiesbach). In essence, only two walls of the castle have been preserved. "In the past (editor's note: in the 19th century) the stones of the castle were used by the Wiesbachers for building houses" (Alwin Jung Senior, Wiesbach, born 1889).
- Protestant parish church: Protestant 'Dietrich Bonhoeffer Church' "The current Protestant parish church, built in the first half of the 14th century. Excavations on the occasion of an extensive renovation in the 1960s revealed that the Gothic building rises on the remains of a former Romanesque church, which was built around the turn of the millennium. Since Peace of Rijswijk' (1697) it has been used simultaneous. "(Friedrich Weber, Wiesbach). Since the beginning of the 20th century, it is no longer used simultaneously because a new Catholic parish church was built. It was named Dietrich-Bonhoeffer-Kirche and was completely renovated in the 1960s.
- Catholic parish church of the Assumption of the Virgin Mary (German: Mariä Himmelfahrt): Built from 1912 to 1914, the complete renovation in the early 1990s revealed that it was an Art Nouveau church in the Südwestpfalz. As the church was gradually rebuilt over time, it was decided to restore the artistic elements inside to their original state. For example, a new high altar was reconstructed after the original photos. The bells are made up of three bells in the notes fis' - a '- h' by Albert Junker of Brilon. They were cast in 1952 as special bronze bells.

== Gallery ==
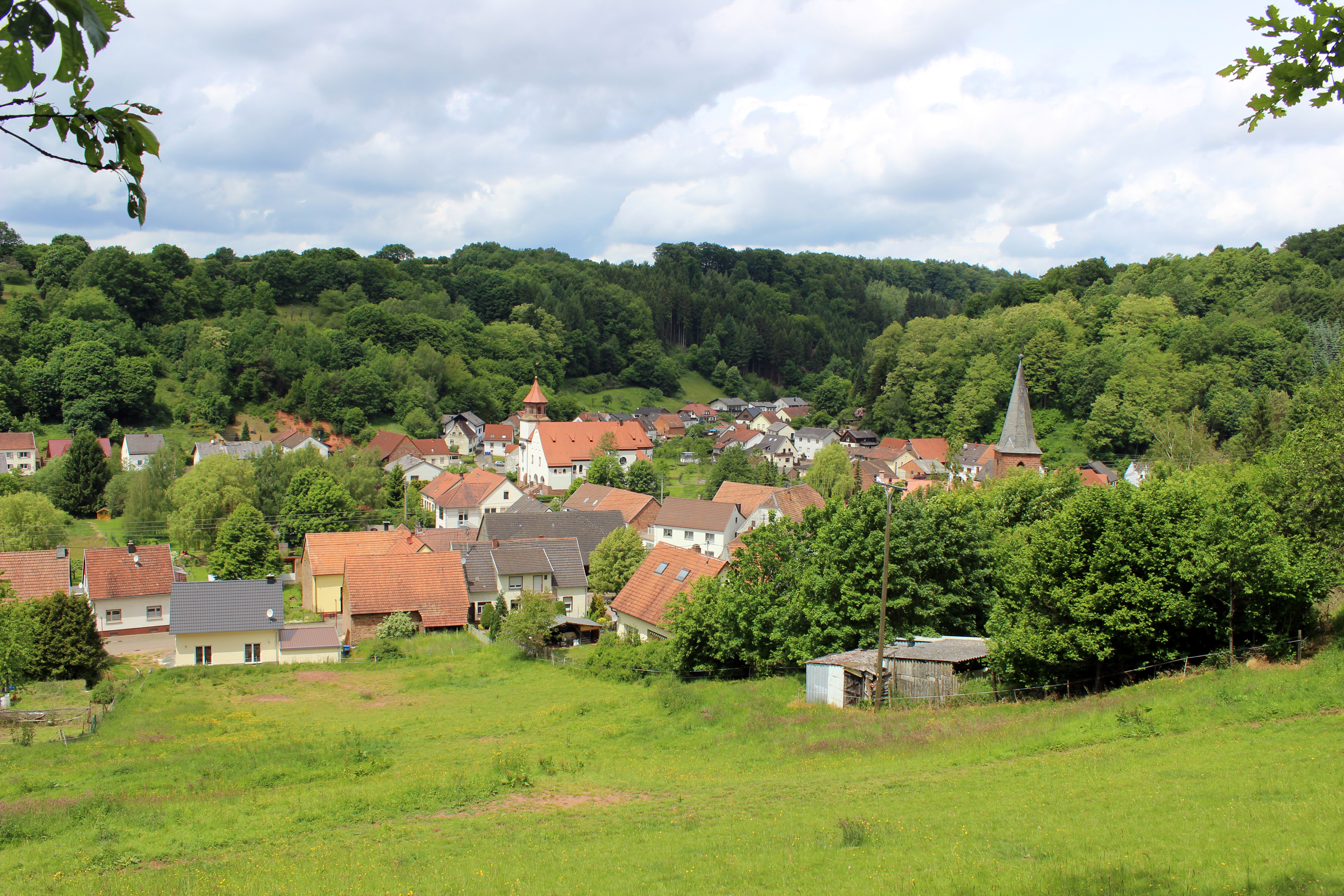
The Center of Wiesbach

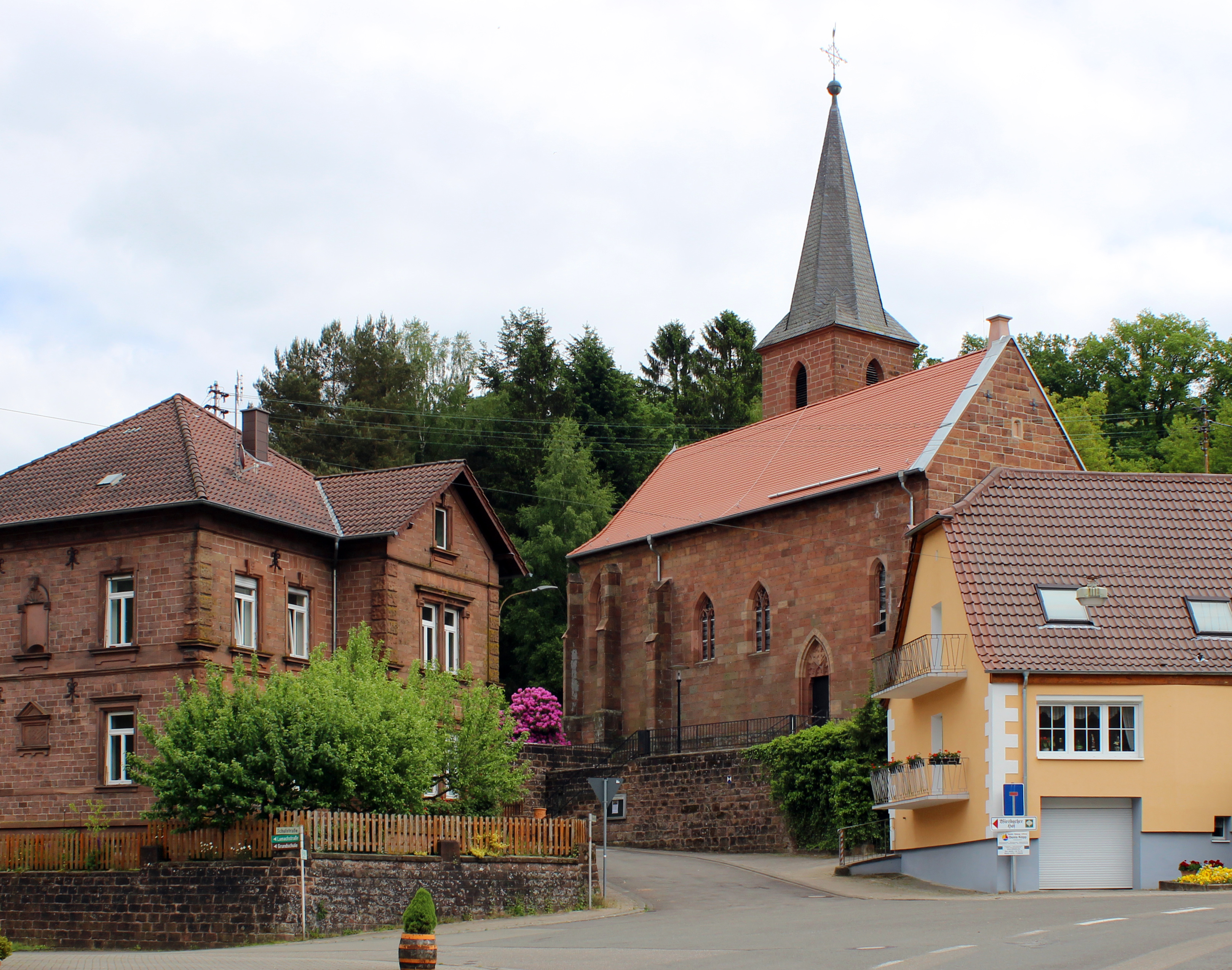
The Dietrich Bonhoeffer Church

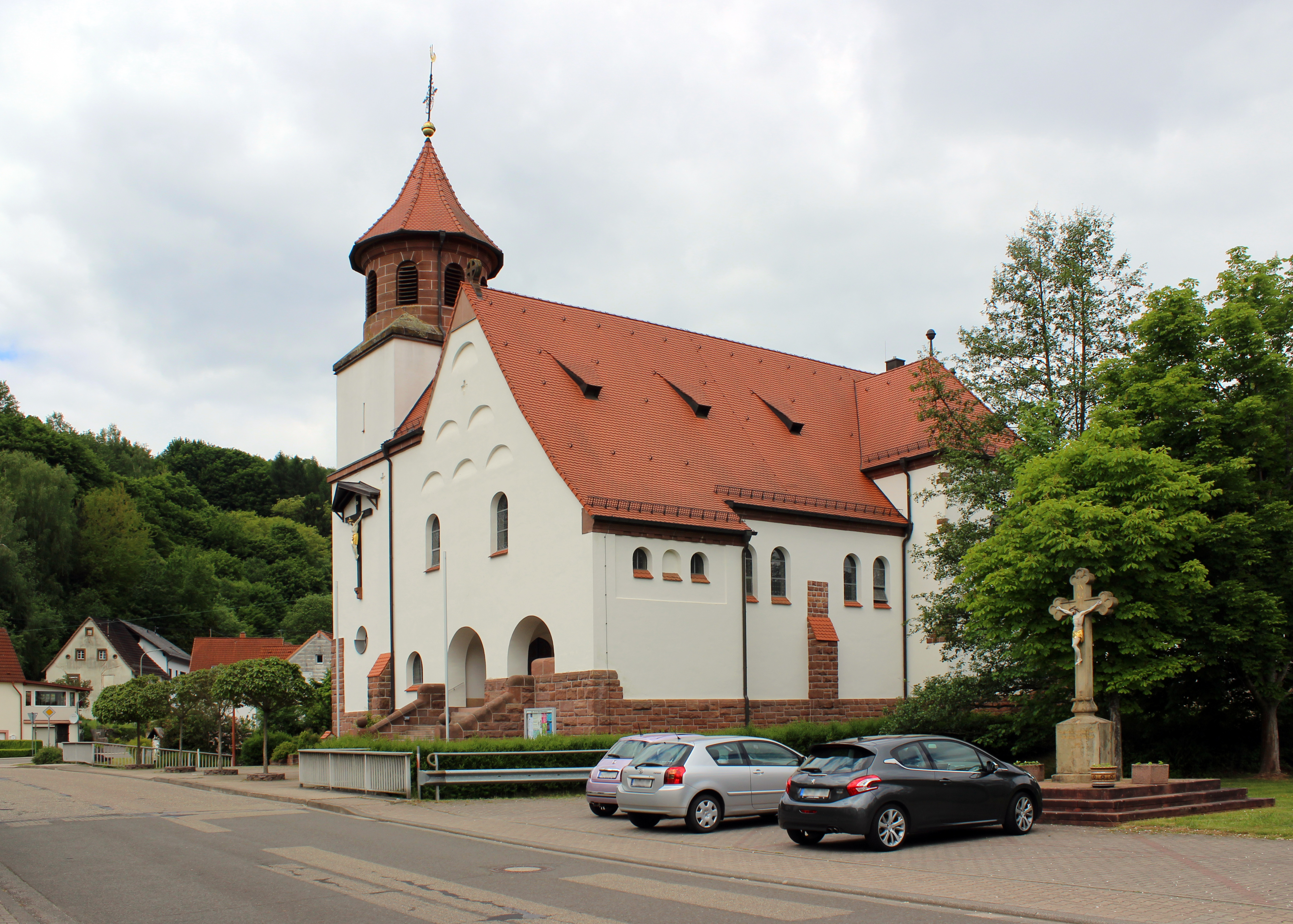
The church of the Assumption of the Virgin Mary

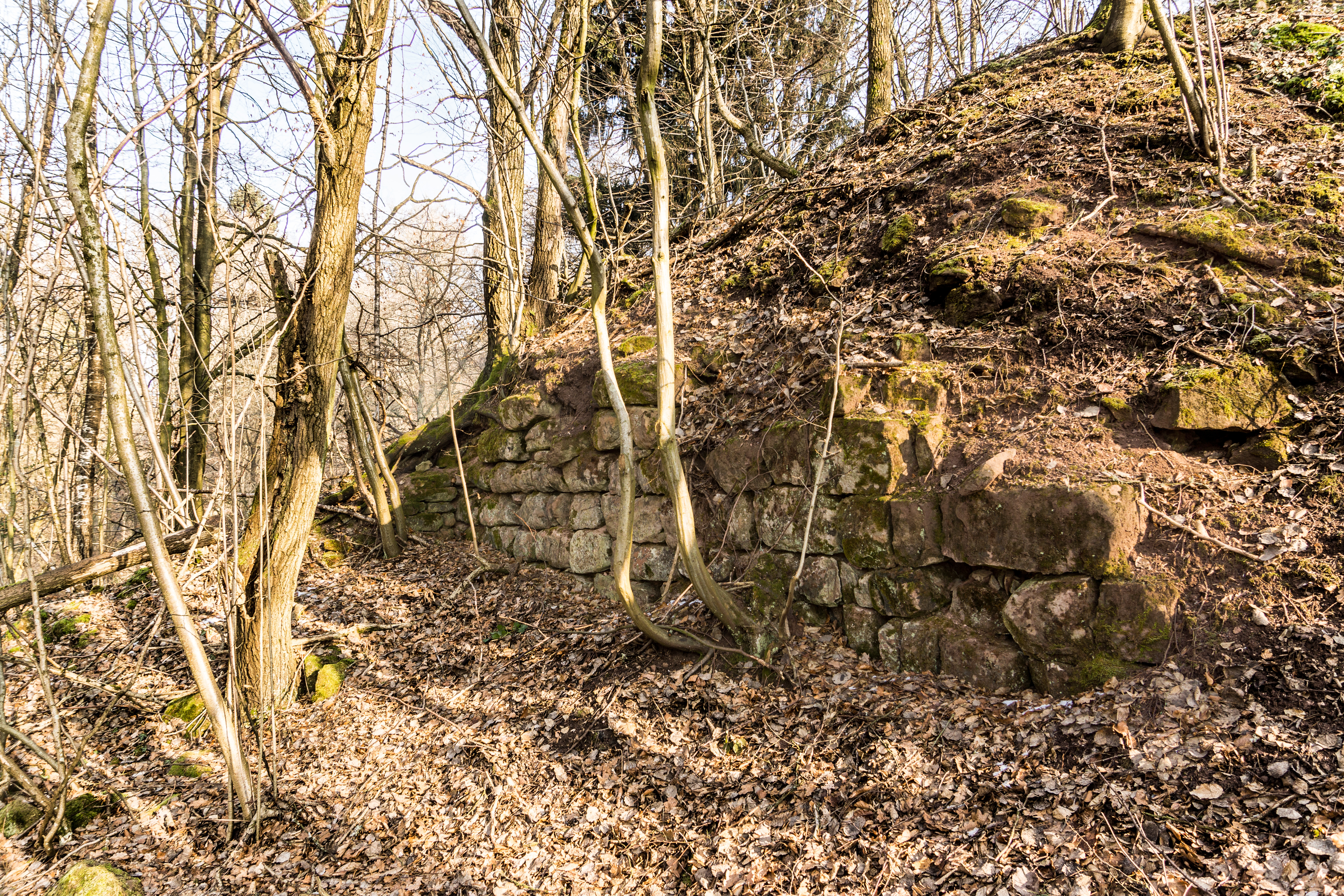
The Ruin of Castle Wiesbach
