= Dellfeld =

- Municipality
- Coat of arms

- Location of Dellfeld within Südwestpfalz district
- Interactive map of Dellfeld
- Location within Germany Location within Rhineland-Palatinate
- Coordinates: 49°13′52″N 7°28′19″E
- Country: Germany
- State: Rhineland-Palatinate
- District: Südwestpfalz
- Municipal assoc.: Zweibrücken-Land
- Subdivisions: 3

Government
  - Mayor (2019–24): Doris Schindler (SPD)

Area
  - Total: 7.25 km^{2} (2.80 sq mi)
- Elevation: 238 m (781 ft)

Population (2025-12-31)
  - Total: 1,376
  - Density: 190/km^{2} (492/sq mi)
- Time zone: UTC+01:00 (CET)
  - Summer (DST): UTC+02:00 (CEST)
- Postal codes: 66503
- Dialling codes: 06336
- Vehicle registration: PS
- Website: www.dellfeld.de

Dellfeld (German pronunciation: [ˈdɛlfɛlt]) is a municipality in Südwestpfalz district, in Rhineland-Palatinate, western Germany.
