= Geiselberg =

- Municipality
- Coat of arms

- Location of Geiselberg within Südwestpfalz district
- Interactive map of Geiselberg
- Location within Germany Location within Rhineland-Palatinate
- Coordinates: 49°19′38″N 7°41′35″E
- Country: Germany
- State: Rhineland-Palatinate
- District: Südwestpfalz
- Municipal assoc.: Waldfischbach-Burgalben

Government
  - Mayor (2019–24): Marika Vatter

Area
  - Total: 6.33 km^{2} (2.44 sq mi)
- Elevation: 400–415 m (1,312–1,362 ft)

Population (2025-12-31)
  - Total: 778
  - Density: 123/km^{2} (318/sq mi)
- Time zone: UTC+01:00 (CET)
  - Summer (DST): UTC+02:00 (CEST)
- Postal codes: 67715
- Dialling codes: 06307
- Vehicle registration: PS
- Website: www.geiselberg.de

Geiselberg (German pronunciation: [ˈɡaɪzl̩bɛʁk]; Palatine German: Geiseberg) is a municipality in Südwestpfalz district, in Rhineland-Palatinate, western Germany.
