= Käshofen =

- Municipality
- Coat of arms

- Location of Käshofen within Südwestpfalz district
- Interactive map of Käshofen
- Location within Germany Location within Rhineland-Palatinate
- Coordinates: 49°19′33″N 7°24′57″E
- Country: Germany
- State: Rhineland-Palatinate
- District: Südwestpfalz
- Municipal assoc.: Zweibrücken-Land

Government
  - Mayor (2019–24): Egon Gilbert

Area
  - Total: 8.82 km^{2} (3.41 sq mi)
- Elevation: 369 m (1,211 ft)

Population (2025-12-31)
  - Total: 611
  - Density: 69.3/km^{2} (179/sq mi)
- Time zone: UTC+01:00 (CET)
  - Summer (DST): UTC+02:00 (CEST)
- Postal codes: 66894
- Dialling codes: 06337
- Vehicle registration: PS, ZW
- Website: www.vgzwland.de

Käshofen is a municipality in Südwestpfalz district, in Rhineland-Palatinate, western Germany.
