= Dietrichingen =

- Municipality
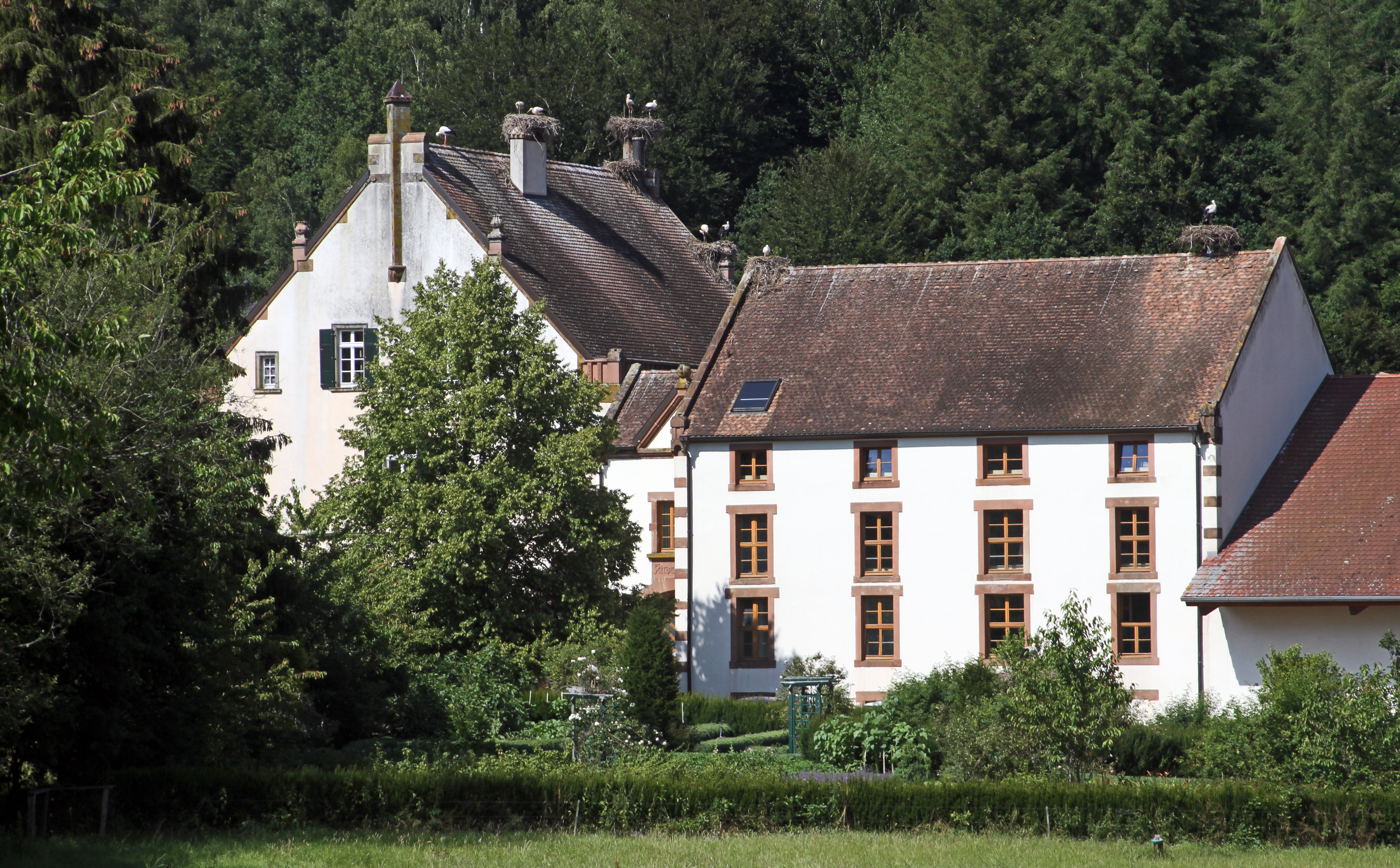

- Coat of arms

- Location of Dietrichingen within Südwestpfalz district
- Interactive map of Dietrichingen
- Location within Germany Location within Rhineland-Palatinate
- Coordinates: 49°11′20″N 7°24′52″E
- Country: Germany
- State: Rhineland-Palatinate
- District: Südwestpfalz
- Municipal assoc.: Zweibrücken-Land

Government
  - Mayor (2019–24): Ulrike Vogelgesang

Area
  - Total: 9.38 km^{2} (3.62 sq mi)
- Elevation: 245 m (804 ft)

Population (2025-12-31)
  - Total: 352
  - Density: 37.5/km^{2} (97.2/sq mi)
- Time zone: UTC+01:00 (CET)
  - Summer (DST): UTC+02:00 (CEST)
- Postal codes: 66484
- Dialling codes: 06338
- Vehicle registration: PS
- Website: www.dietrichingen.de

Dietrichingen is a municipality in Südwestpfalz district, in Rhineland-Palatinate, western Germany.
