= Rosenkopf =

- Municipality
- Coat of arms

- Location of Rosenkopf within Südwestpfalz district
- Interactive map of Rosenkopf
- Location within Germany Location within Rhineland-Palatinate
- Coordinates: 49°20′41″N 7°25′58″E
- Country: Germany
- State: Rhineland-Palatinate
- District: Südwestpfalz
- Municipal assoc.: Zweibrücken-Land

Government
  - Mayor (2024–2029): Maria Fier

Area
  - Total: 2.48 km^{2} (0.96 sq mi)
- Elevation: 375 m (1,230 ft)

Population (2025-12-31)
  - Total: 368
  - Density: 148/km^{2} (384/sq mi)
- Time zone: UTC+01:00 (CET)
  - Summer (DST): UTC+02:00 (CEST)
- Postal codes: 66894
- Dialling codes: 06372
- Vehicle registration: PS, ZW
- Website: www.vgzwland.de

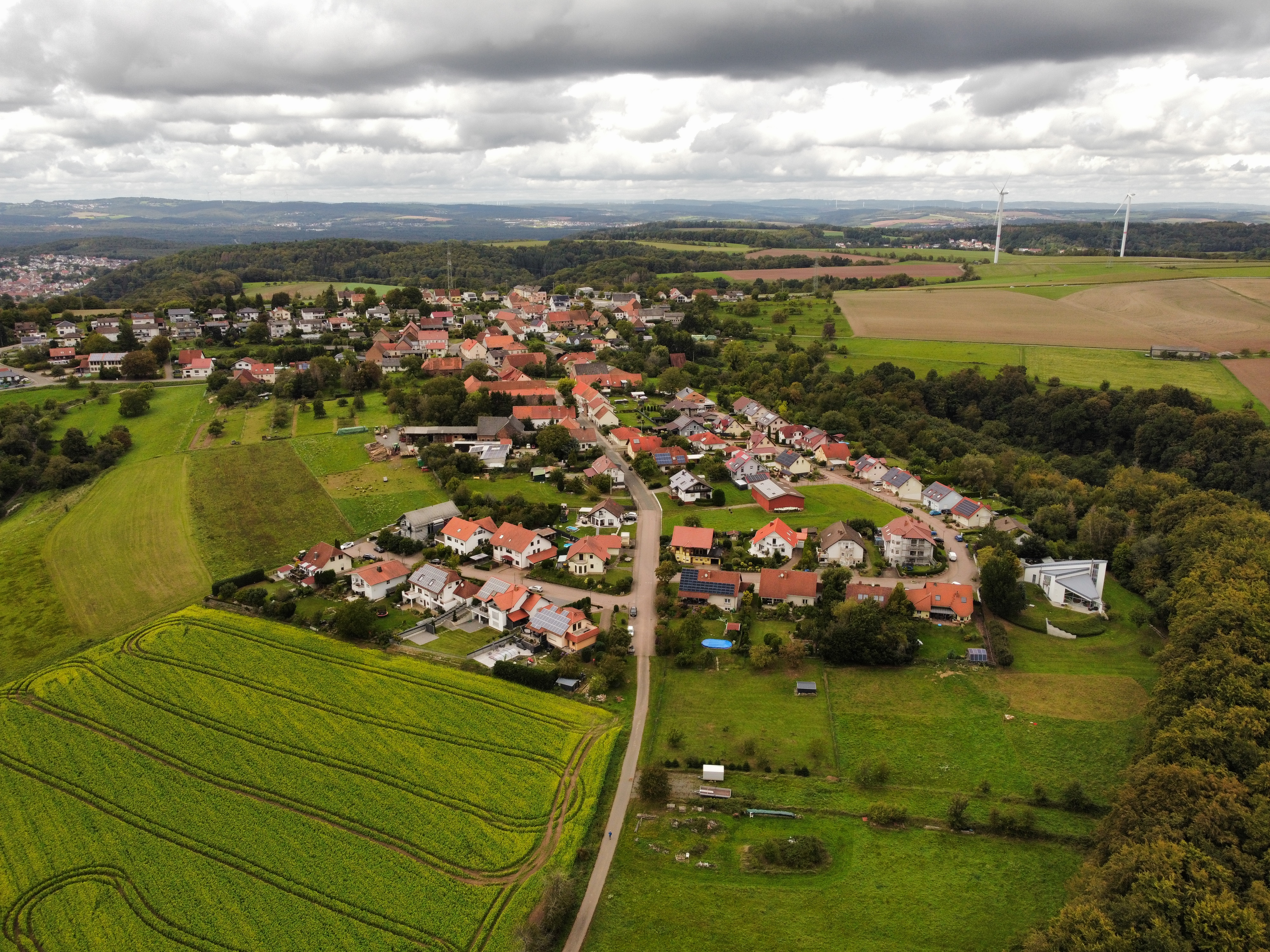
Arrial view of Rosenkopf (2023)

Rosenkopf (German pronunciation: [ˈʁoːzn̩kɔpf]) is a municipality in the district of Südwestpfalz in Rhineland-Palatinate. It belongs to the municipality of Zweibrücken-Land, within which it is the smallest municipality in terms of area.

== Geography ==
Rosenkopf is located in the north-west of the district near the border to Saarland on the "Sickinger Höhe". Immediately to the north is the neighboring district of Kaiserslautern. To the west is Bechhofen, to the north Lambsborn, to the south-east Wiesbach and to the south-west Käshofen.

== Politics ==
=== Major ===
Maria Fier became the mayor of Rosenkopf on July 15, 2024. In the direct election on June 9, 2024, she was the only candidate to be elected for a five-year term with 91.2% of the vote.

=== Coat of Arms ===
Blazon: “In black on a green trefoil a silver pole, covered with three red rose blossoms with a golden finial and green sepals, removed on the right by a golden, red-armed and -armed left-turned lion, on the left by five silver bulbs 2:1:2.”

Reason for the coat of arms: The “speaking” symbols roses and mountain refer to the place name and the underlying field name. The golden lion refers to the former territorial affiliation of the village to the Principality of Palatinate-Zweibrücken, while the silver bolls remind us that the parent village of Wiesbach belonged to the Sicking dominion of Landstuhl from the late Middle Ages until the exchange in 1589; Rosenkopf itself was never Sicking.

The coat of arms was granted in November 1982 by the district government of Rheinhessen-Pfalz.

== Honorary citizens ==
2010, July 10: Kurt Rücker, crane builder. Born on August 5, 1940 in Rosenkopf, Kurt Rücker was honored for his great commitment and financial support of the infrastructure of his birthplace.

== Literature ==
- M. Wallner-Süs (2025), Und doch wurde Rosenkopf aufgebaut!, Rosenkopf: Self-published
