= Walshausen =

- Municipality
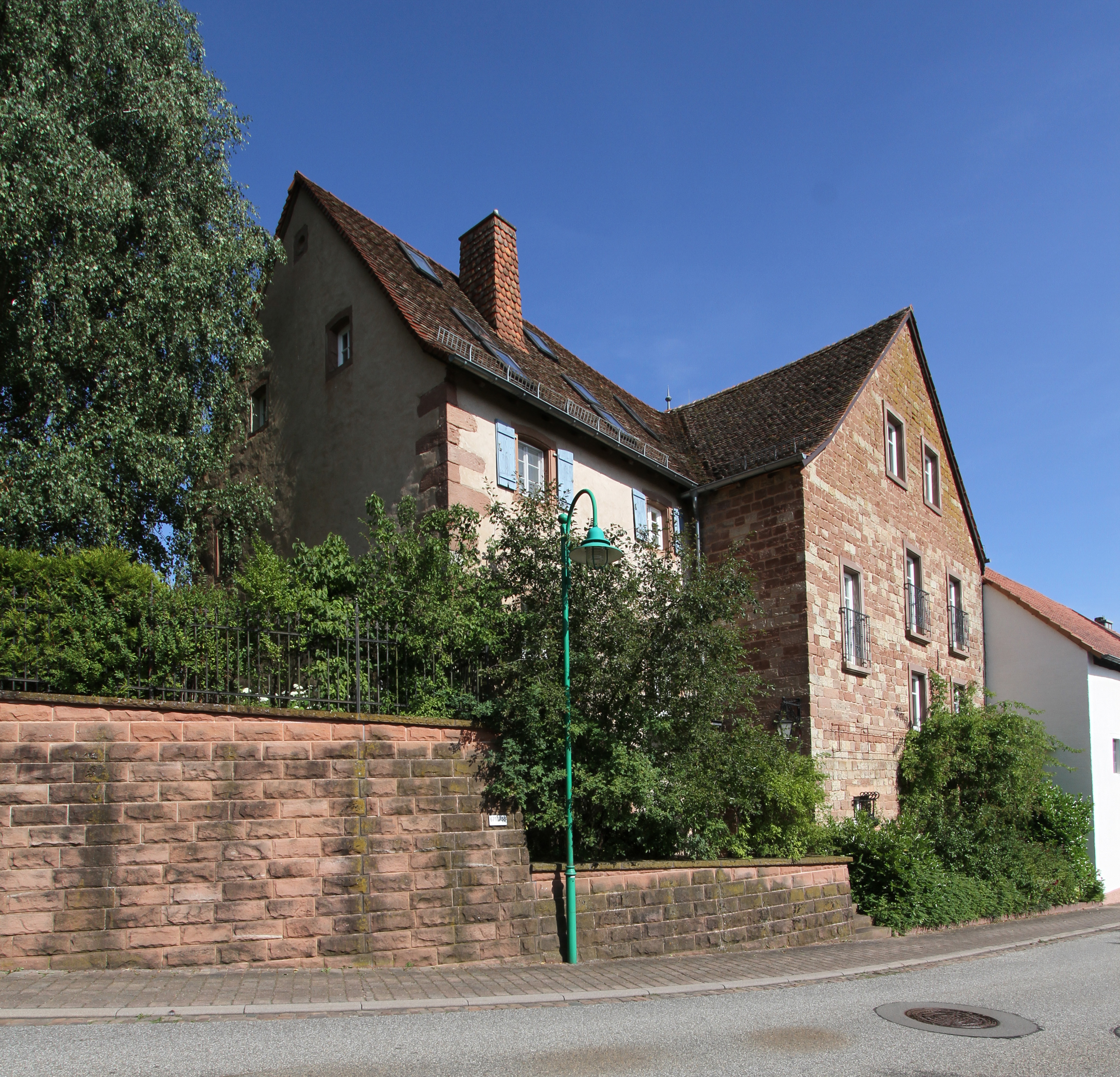

- Coat of arms

- Location of Walshausen within Südwestpfalz district
- Interactive map of Walshausen
- Location within Germany Location within Rhineland-Palatinate
- Coordinates: 49°12′35″N 7°28′55″E
- Country: Germany
- State: Rhineland-Palatinate
- District: Südwestpfalz
- Municipal assoc.: Zweibrücken-Land

Government
  - Mayor (2019–24): Gunther Veith

Area
  - Total: 4.63 km^{2} (1.79 sq mi)
- Elevation: 260 m (850 ft)

Population (2025-12-31)
  - Total: 307
  - Density: 66.3/km^{2} (172/sq mi)
- Time zone: UTC+01:00 (CET)
  - Summer (DST): UTC+02:00 (CEST)
- Postal codes: 66484
- Dialling codes: 06339
- Vehicle registration: PS
- Website: www.derwalshauser.de

Walshausen is a German village in the Zweibrücken-Land municipality, in the Südwestpfalz district in the Rhineland-Palatinate. As of December 2020 it had 320 inhabitants. Walshausen is first mentioned in history in 1463.
