= Hornbach, Germany =

Hornbach
- Town
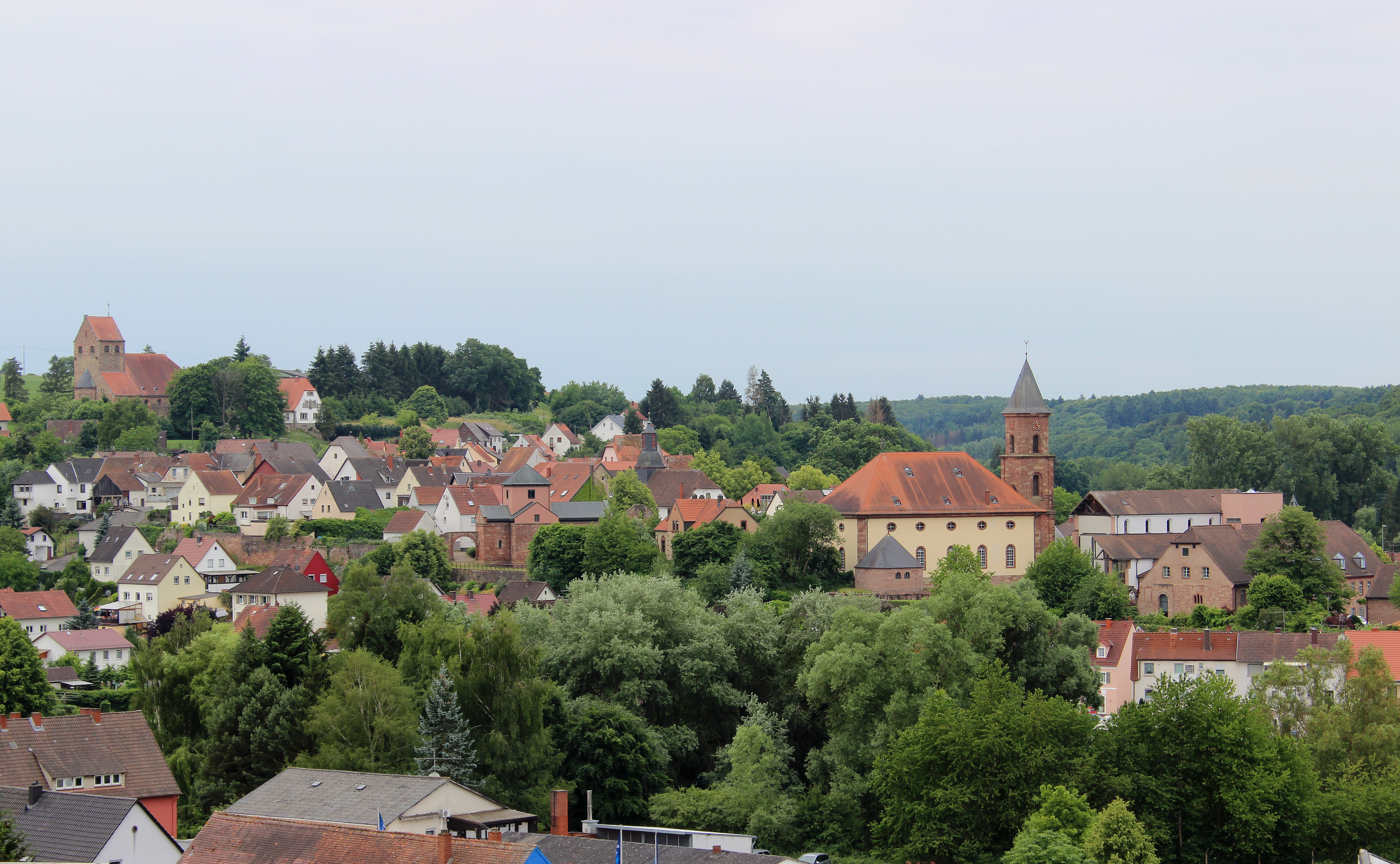
- Hornbach

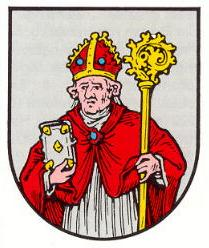
- Coat of arms

- Location of Hornbach within Südwestpfalz district
- Interactive map of Hornbach
- Location within Germany Location within Rhineland-Palatinate
- Coordinates: 49°11′17″N 7°22′09″E
- Country: Germany
- State: Rhineland-Palatinate
- District: Südwestpfalz
- Municipal assoc.: Zweibrücken-Land

Government
  - Mayor (2019–24): Reinhold Hohn (FDP)

Area
  - Total: 13.34 km^{2} (5.15 sq mi)
- Elevation: 233 m (764 ft)

Population (2025-12-31)
  - Total: 1,381
  - Density: 103.5/km^{2} (268.1/sq mi)
- Time zone: UTC+01:00 (CET)
  - Summer (DST): UTC+02:00 (CEST)
- Postal codes: 66500
- Dialling codes: 06338
- Vehicle registration: PS

Hornbach (German pronunciation: [ˈhɔʁnˌbax]) is a town in the Südwestpfalz district, in Rhineland-Palatinate, Germany. It is situated southwest of the Palatinate Forest, on the border with France, south of Zweibrücken. It is part of the Verbandsgemeinde ("collective municipality") Zweibrücken-Land.

A brook, the Hornbach, from which the town takes its present name, a left tributary of the Schwarzbach, bisects the town. The original name was Gamundias (Gemündung), which means confluence.

== History ==
The monastery was the most likely reason for the founding of the town of Hornbach. According to legend, Saint Pirmin (d. 11/3/753) chose this area for the foundation of the monastery. A plaque in the renovated monastery museum indicates that the monastery was founded in 737. Pirmin is buried in a crypt near the old church, a short distance from the monastery.

In 1220, Hornbach was under the direct ecclesiastical rule of the Bishop of Metz. King Charles IV, Holy Roman Emperor 1316-1378, also known as King Karl IV of Weisswasser in Bohemia, gave the town of Hornbach its town rights on 16 April 1352, in connection with the establishment of a mayoral office.

Hieronymus Bock, considered the first modern botanist, lived at the monastery beginning in 1533.

Hornbach was supposedly uninhabited from 1636 for 3 years, during the Thirty Years' War (1618–1648). At this time, the completely depopulated and desolate area was avoided by the troops. Due to the war, the number of citizens decreased from 88 families, 10 widows with 75 houses to 30 citizens and 5 widows. 40% of the population was evacuated. The craftsmen began the rebuilding in 1648. In 1657, the reinstatement of the town rights was confirmed. With respect to agriculture, in Zweibrücken as in Westrich, where there were extensive vineyards, these vineyards were not replanted'. After the war, the Dukes of Zweibrücken called Tryolean and Swiss immigrants into their emptied lands (Westrich). During the "Reunion" (1680–1697), the Duchy Palatinate-Zweibrücken was incorporated into the centralist French state. Foreign immigrants were encouraged to settle in the Saar and Alsace provinces by receiving generous privileges. On 17 October 1680, the French government promised settlers the following: cattle, goods, and money, in addition to a tax-free period of 10 years. Later, the Duchy of Palatinate-Zweibrücken fell as a result of the French Revolution. See also: Schweizer Einwanderer im Westrich, 1650-1750, Zweibrucker Arbeitsgemeinschaft für Familienforschung (1995; ISBN 3-924171-23-8).

== Outline ==
The historic town sits on a hill between the small rivers Hornbach and Schwalb, and is encircled by a defensive wall, and town gates. A 'Stadtplan des Favart' showing the encircling stone wall, interior streets, church, monastery, and other buildings was produced circa 1704.

An historic Town Hall (Rathaus) remains in public use.

After extensive stabilization and a beautiful renovation with historic and archaeological sensitivity, the original monastery is currently used as a modern hotel, restaurant and cafe, the Kloster-Hornbach. A portion of the space houses a museum.

The New Church-the Evangelical Protestant Church built in 1785, stands next to the monastery. It is an expansion and renovation of the old Church, which was utilized for hundreds of years prior to that date . There is also a very old Catholic Church, next to the tomb of Pirminius.

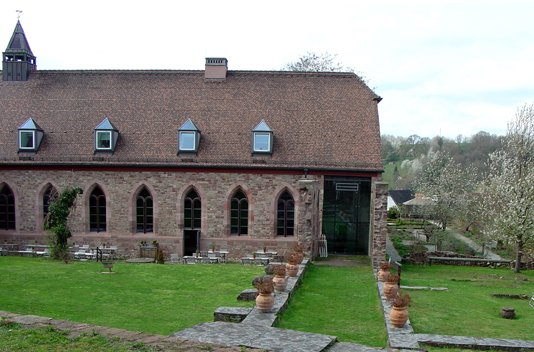
The Hornbach Monastery/Kloster Hornbach in 2005

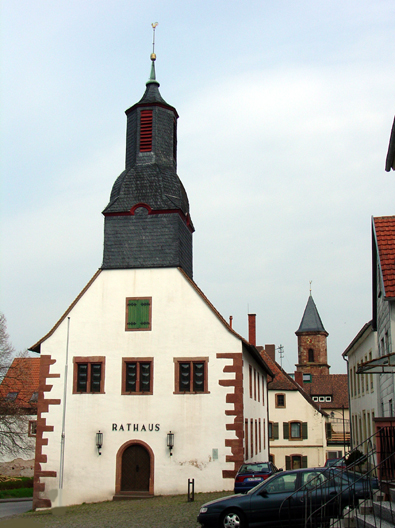
Rathaus in 2005, with church steeple in background

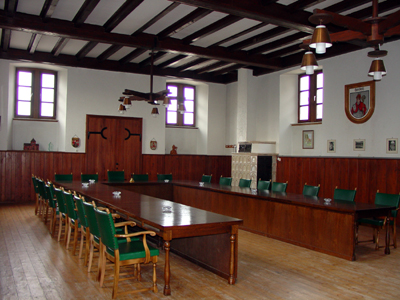
Interior of Rathaus, 2005

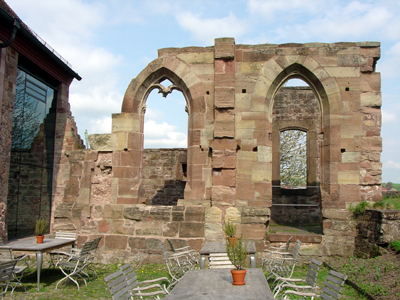
Ruins of the historic Hornbach monastery, 2005

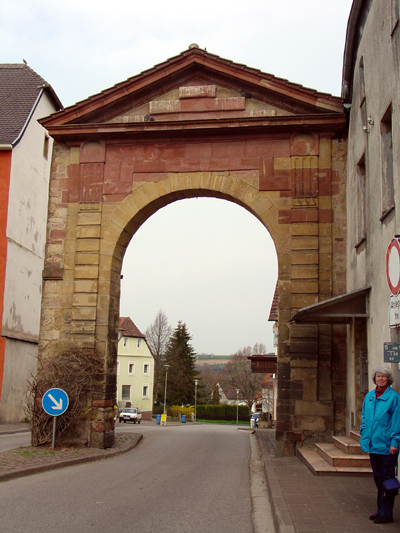
Historic town gate, in 2005

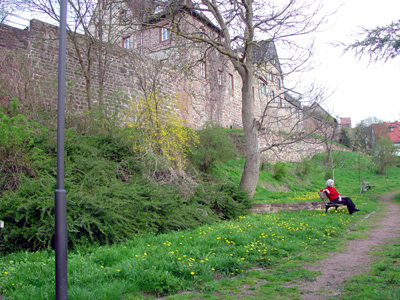
Historic town wall, in 2005

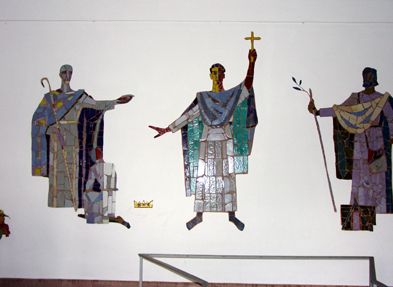
Art on wall of Pirminius Tomb

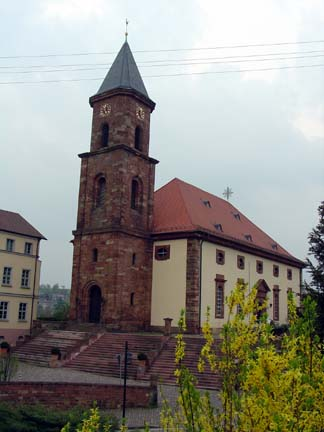
Hornbach Church, 2005

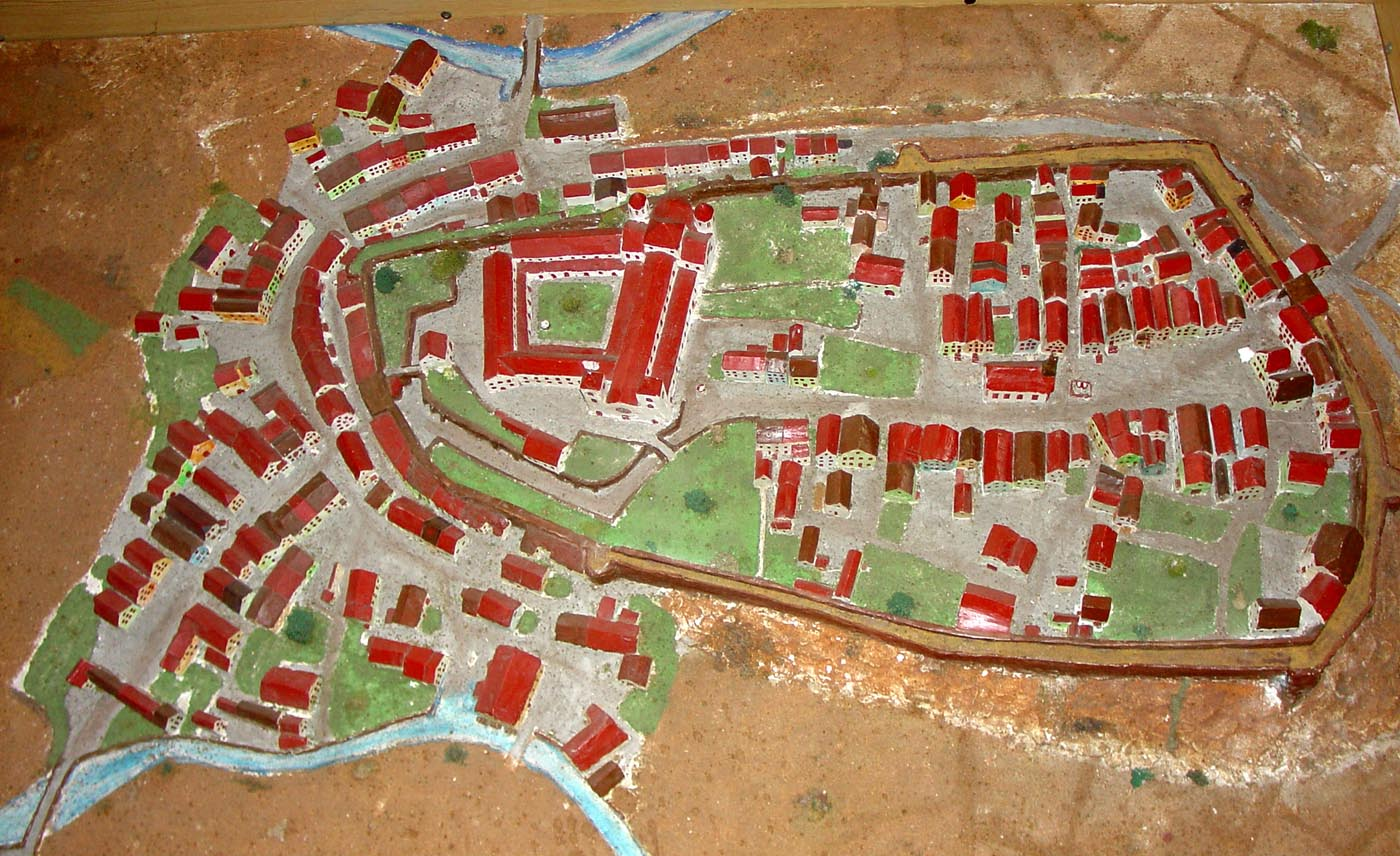
