= Großsteinhausen =

- Municipality
- Coat of arms

- Location of Großsteinhausen within Südwestpfalz district
- Interactive map of Großsteinhausen
- Location within Germany Location within Rhineland-Palatinate
- Coordinates: 49°11′26″N 7°27′18″E
- Country: Germany
- State: Rhineland-Palatinate
- District: Südwestpfalz
- Municipal assoc.: Zweibrücken-Land

Government
  - Mayor (2019–24): Volker Schmitt

Area
  - Total: 4.84 km^{2} (1.87 sq mi)
- Elevation: 303 m (994 ft)

Population (2025-12-31)
  - Total: 571
  - Density: 118/km^{2} (306/sq mi)
- Time zone: UTC+01:00 (CET)
  - Summer (DST): UTC+02:00 (CEST)
- Postal codes: 66484
- Dialling codes: 06339
- Vehicle registration: PS
- Website: www.grosssteinhausen.de

Großsteinhausen is a municipality in Südwestpfalz district, in Rhineland-Palatinate, western Germany.
