= Riedelberg =

- Municipality
- Coat of arms

- Location of Riedelberg within Südwestpfalz district
- Interactive map of Riedelberg
- Location within Germany Location within Rhineland-Palatinate
- Coordinates: 49°10′40″N 7°26′49″E
- Country: Germany
- State: Rhineland-Palatinate
- District: Südwestpfalz
- Municipal assoc.: Zweibrücken-Land

Government
  - Mayor (2019–24): Christian Schwarz

Area
  - Total: 5.22 km^{2} (2.02 sq mi)
- Elevation: 317 m (1,040 ft)

Population (2025-12-31)
  - Total: 448
  - Density: 85.8/km^{2} (222/sq mi)
- Time zone: UTC+01:00 (CET)
  - Summer (DST): UTC+02:00 (CEST)
- Postal codes: 66484
- Dialling codes: 06339
- Vehicle registration: PS
- Website: www.vgzwland.de

Riedelberg (German pronunciation: [ˈʁiːdl̩bɛʁk]) is a municipality in Südwestpfalz district, in Rhineland-Palatinate, western Germany.
