= Großbundenbach =

- Municipality
- Coat of arms

- Location of Großbundenbach within Südwestpfalz district
- Interactive map of Großbundenbach
- Location within Germany Location within Rhineland-Palatinate
- Coordinates: 49°18′24″N 7°25′24″E
- Country: Germany
- State: Rhineland-Palatinate
- District: Südwestpfalz
- Municipal assoc.: Zweibrücken-Land

Government
  - Mayor (2019–24): Dieter Glahn (SPD)

Area
  - Total: 6.90 km^{2} (2.66 sq mi)
- Elevation: 339 m (1,112 ft)

Population (2025-12-31)
  - Total: 328
  - Density: 47.5/km^{2} (123/sq mi)
- Time zone: UTC+01:00 (CET)
  - Summer (DST): UTC+02:00 (CEST)
- Postal codes: 66501
- Dialling codes: 06337
- Vehicle registration: PS
- Website: www.grossbundenbach.de

Großbundenbach is a municipality in Südwestpfalz district, in Rhineland-Palatinate, western Germany.
