= Horbach, Südwestpfalz =

Horbach
- Municipality
- Coat of arms

- Location of Horbach within Südwestpfalz district
- Interactive map of Horbach
- Location within Germany Location within Rhineland-Palatinate
- Coordinates: 49°19′50″N 7°39′20″E
- Country: Germany
- State: Rhineland-Palatinate
- District: Südwestpfalz
- Municipal assoc.: Waldfischbach-Burgalben

Government
  - Mayor (2019–24): Walfried Schäfer

Area
  - Total: 5.31 km^{2} (2.05 sq mi)
- Elevation: 278–303 m (912–994 ft)

Population (2025-12-31)
  - Total: 500
  - Density: 94/km^{2} (240/sq mi)
- Time zone: UTC+01:00 (CET)
  - Summer (DST): UTC+02:00 (CEST)
- Postal codes: 66851
- Dialling codes: 06333
- Vehicle registration: PS
- Website: vgwaldfischbach-burgalben.de

Horbach (German pronunciation: [ˈhɔʁbax]; Palatine German: Hórbach) is a municipality in Südwestpfalz district, in Rhineland-Palatinate, western Germany.
