= Waldfischbach-Burgalben (Verbandsgemeinde) =

Verbandsgemeinde in Rhineland-Palatinate

- Verbandsgemeinde
- Location of Waldfischbach-Burgalben within Südwestpfalz district
- Interactive map of Waldfischbach-Burgalben
- Location within Germany Location within Rhineland-Palatinate
- Coordinates: 49°17′N 7°40′E
- Country: Germany
- State: Rhineland-Palatinate
- District: Südwestpfalz
- Seat: Waldfischbach-Burgalben
- Subdivisions: 8 municipalities

Area
  - Total: 94.21 km^{2} (36.37 sq mi)

Population (2025-12-31)
  - Total: 11,268
  - Density: 119.6/km^{2} (309.8/sq mi)
- Time zone: UTC+01:00 (CET)
  - Summer (DST): UTC+02:00 (CEST)
- Website: www.vgwaldfischbach-burgalben.de

Waldfischbach-Burgalben is a Verbandsgemeinde ("collective municipality") in the Südwestpfalz district, in Rhineland-Palatinate, Germany. The seat of the municipality is in Waldfischbach-Burgalben.

The Verbandsgemeinde Waldfischbach-Burgalben consists of the following Ortsgemeinden ("local municipalities"):

1. Geiselberg
2. Heltersberg
3. Hermersberg
4. Höheinöd
5. Horbach
6. Schmalenberg
7. Steinalben
8. Waldfischbach-Burgalben
