= Kleinsteinhausen =

- Municipality
- Coat of arms

- Location of Kleinsteinhausen within Südwestpfalz district
- Interactive map of Kleinsteinhausen
- Location within Germany Location within Rhineland-Palatinate
- Coordinates: 49°11′57″N 7°28′21″E
- Country: Germany
- State: Rhineland-Palatinate
- District: Südwestpfalz
- Municipal assoc.: Zweibrücken-Land

Government
  - Mayor (2019–24): Martine Beate Wagner

Area
  - Total: 5.73 km^{2} (2.21 sq mi)
- Elevation: 320 m (1,050 ft)

Population (2025-12-31)
  - Total: 744
  - Density: 130/km^{2} (336/sq mi)
- Time zone: UTC+01:00 (CET)
  - Summer (DST): UTC+02:00 (CEST)
- Postal codes: 66484
- Dialling codes: 06339
- Vehicle registration: PS
- Website: www.kleinsteinhausen.de

Kleinsteinhausen is a municipality in Südwestpfalz district, in Rhineland-Palatinate, western Germany.
