= Mauschbach =

- Municipality
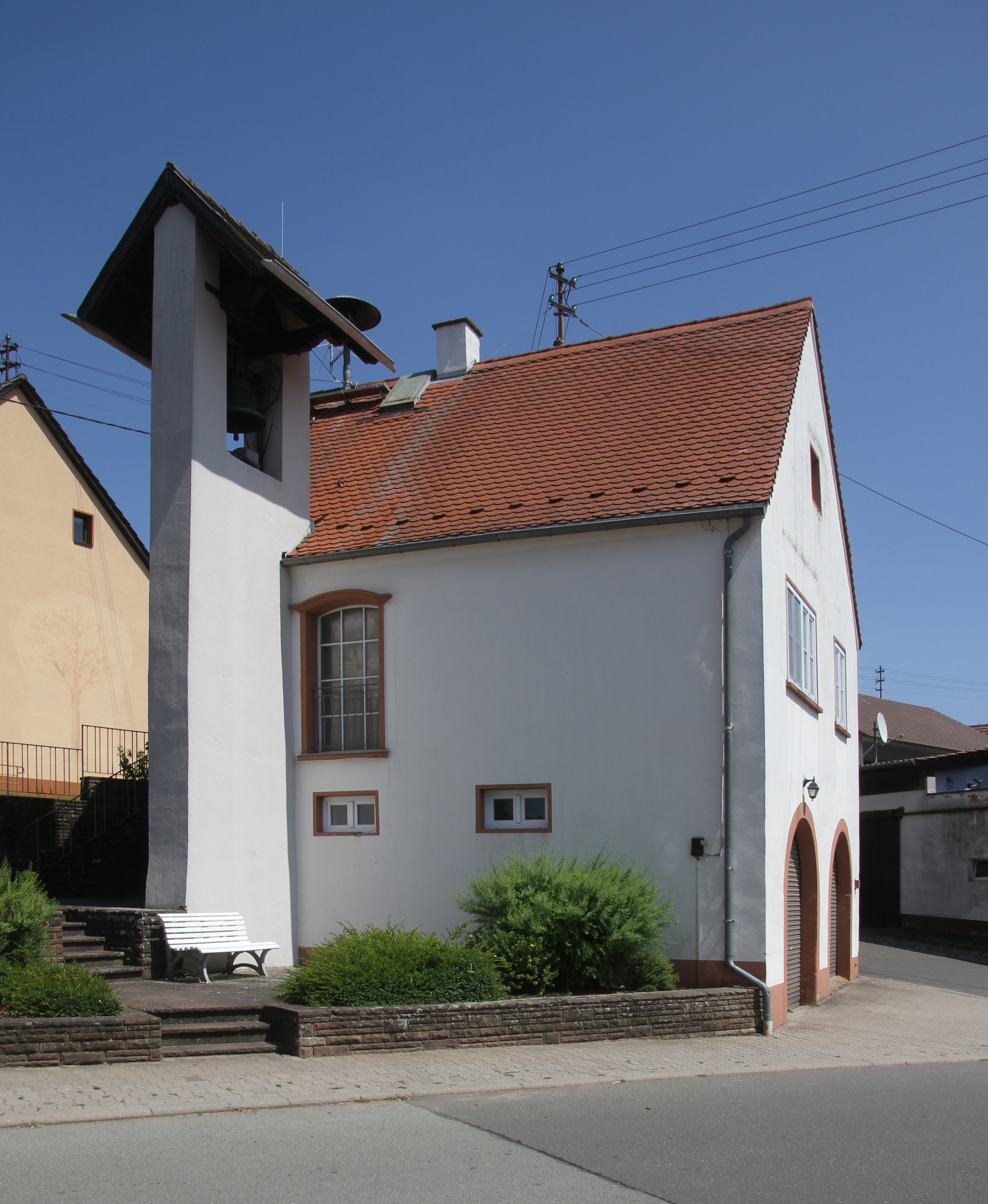

- Coat of arms

- Location of Mauschbach within Südwestpfalz district
- Interactive map of Mauschbach
- Location within Germany Location within Rhineland-Palatinate
- Coordinates: 49°11′09″N 7°23′35″E
- Country: Germany
- State: Rhineland-Palatinate
- District: Südwestpfalz
- Municipal assoc.: Zweibrücken-Land

Government
  - Mayor (2019–24): Bernhard Krippleben

Area
  - Total: 4.45 km^{2} (1.72 sq mi)
- Elevation: 238 m (781 ft)

Population (2025-12-31)
  - Total: 296
  - Density: 66.5/km^{2} (172/sq mi)
- Time zone: UTC+01:00 (CET)
  - Summer (DST): UTC+02:00 (CEST)
- Postal codes: 66500
- Dialling codes: 06338
- Vehicle registration: PS
- Website: mauschbach-pfalz.de

Mauschbach (German pronunciation: [ˈmaʊʃbax]) is a municipality in Südwestpfalz district, in Rhineland-Palatinate, western Germany.
