= Bechhofen, Rhineland-Palatinate =

Bechhofen
- Municipality
- Coat of arms

- Location of Bechhofen within Südwestpfalz district
- Interactive map of Bechhofen
- Location within Germany Location within Rhineland-Palatinate
- Coordinates: 49°21′05″N 7°24′15″E
- Country: Germany
- State: Rhineland-Palatinate
- District: Südwestpfalz
- Municipal assoc.: Zweibrücken-Land

Government
  - Mayor (2019–24): Paul Sefrin (CDU)

Area
  - Total: 6.59 km^{2} (2.54 sq mi)
- Elevation: 222 m (728 ft)

Population (2025-12-31)
  - Total: 2,024
  - Density: 307/km^{2} (795/sq mi)
- Time zone: UTC+01:00 (CET)
  - Summer (DST): UTC+02:00 (CEST)
- Postal codes: 66894
- Dialling codes: 06372
- Vehicle registration: PS
- Website: www.vgzwland.de

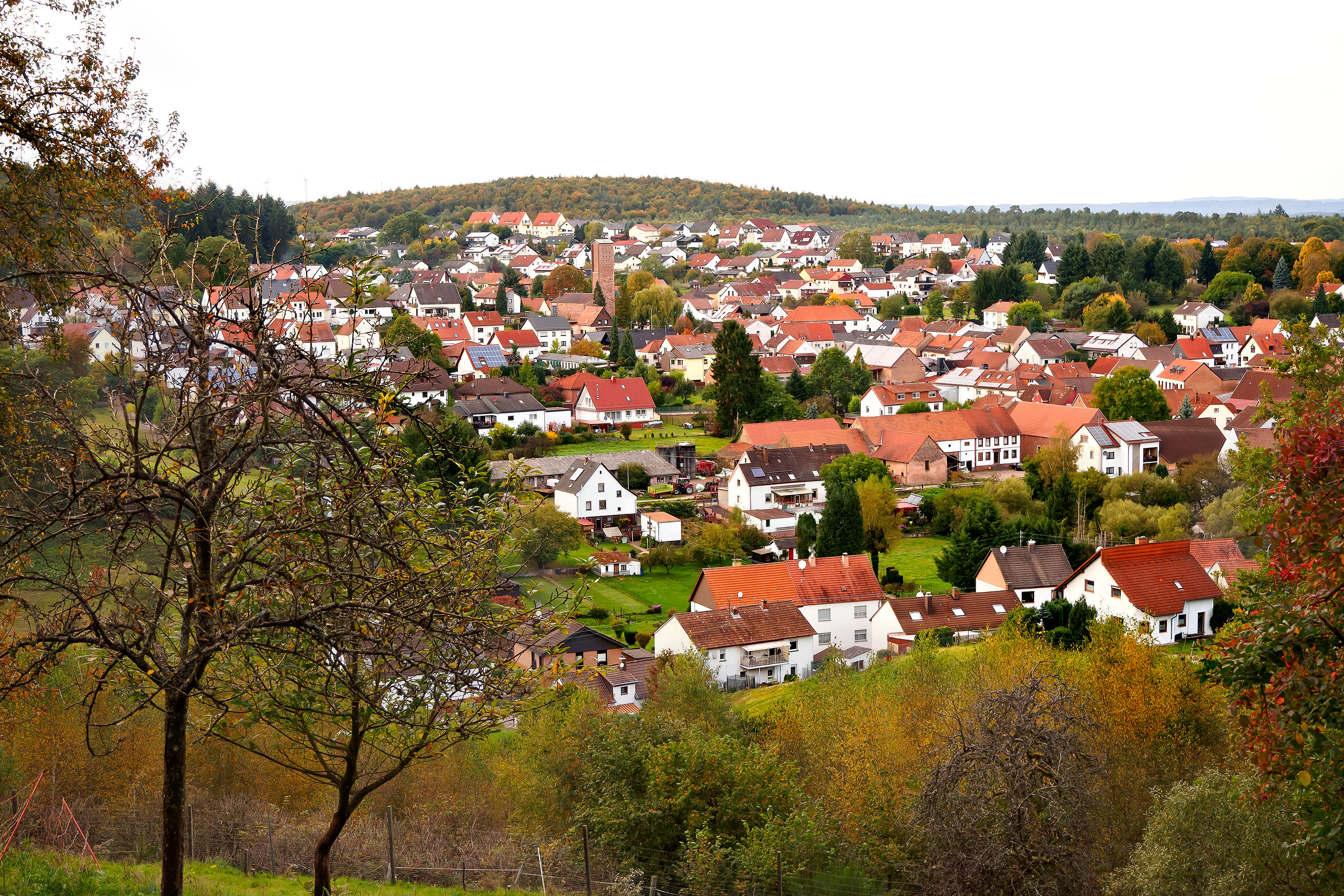
View of the Bechhofen town centre

Bechhofen (German pronunciation: [bɛçˈhoːfn̩]) is a municipality in Südwestpfalz district, in Rhineland-Palatinate, western Germany. It is part of the Verbandsgemeinde ("collective municipality") Zweibrücken-Land.

== Geography ==
The village lies at the foot of the Sickingen Heights and is crossed from northeast to southwest by the Lambsbach.

== History ==
The village of Bechhofen was first mentioned in a document in 1191 and was subsequently named as the seat of a knightly dynasty for several centuries.

After the village was completely devastated during the Thirty Years' War, it was repopulated at the end of the 17th century.

In the year 1755, the district of Homburg including Bechhofen fell to Palatine Zweibrücken by an area exchange. When Christian IV. died in 1775, Charles II August, Duke of Zweibrücken became his successor. Soon he began to construct Karlsberg Castle near Bechhofen as his new residence. This meant an boom for Bechhofen, as numerous soldiers, craftsmen and servants employed on Karlsberg settled here during this period.

Until the end of World War I, Bechhofen belonged to the district of Homburg. When the Treaty of Versailles came into force in 1920, the Saar Territory, including the Homburg district, was newly defined. It was occupied and governed by the United Kingdom and France under a League of Nations mandate. However, Bechhofen together with a few other municipalities remained in the German Reich and was assigned to the Zweibrücken district. Thus Bechhofen became a border area until the Saar Territory was restored to Germany in 1935.

After World War II, Saarland was separated from Germany, annexed to the French customs territory and placed under French protectorate. As a result, new customs stations were set up on the local border of Bechhofen, which remained in place until the Saarland was economically decoupled from France in 1959.

In the course of the administrative and regional reform in 1972, it was incorporated into the district of Pirmasens, which was renamed Südwestpfalz in 1997.

=== Population development ===
The evolution of the population of Bechhofen, the values from 1871 to 1987 are based on population censuses:

Year	Population
1815	261
1835	506
1871	629
1905	917
1939	1.214
1950	1.328

Year	Population
1961	1.665
1970	2.016
1987	1.952
1997	2.371
2005	2.249
2025	2024

== Politics ==
=== Municipal Council ===
The municipal council in Bechhofen consists of 16 council members who were elected in the local elections on 25 May 2014 in a personalised proportional election, and the honorary local mayor as chairman.

The distribution of seats in the municipal council:

Election	SPD	CDU	Sum
2014	7	9	16 Seats
2009	7	9	16 Seats
2004	7	9	16 Seats

=== Mayor ===
Since the local elections in 2009, Paul Sefrin (CDU) has led the municipality as mayor, which he continued with the election victory in the 2014 local elections.

== Culture and sights ==
=== Buildings ===
- Catholic church Saint Michael
- Protestant church
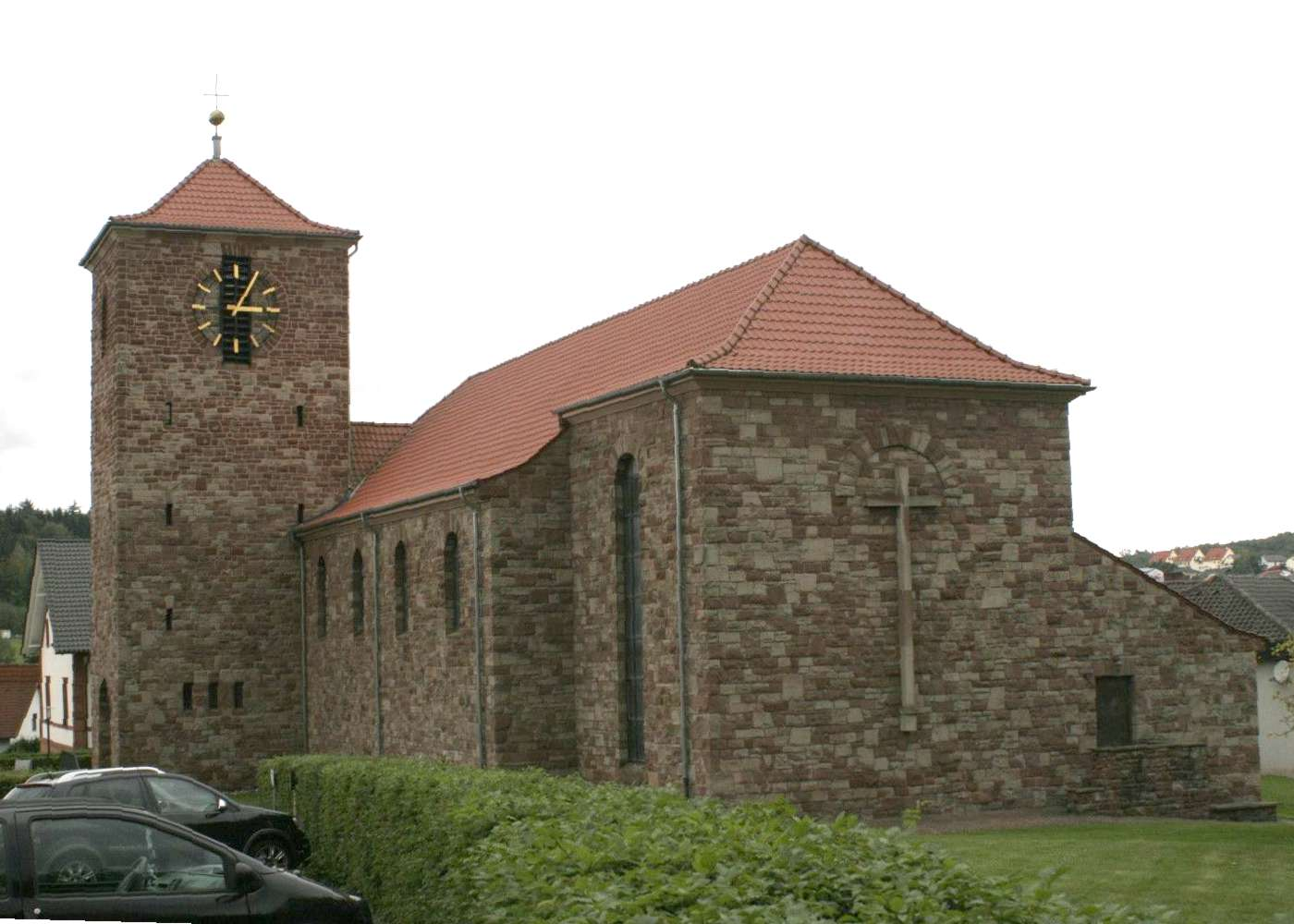
Catholic church

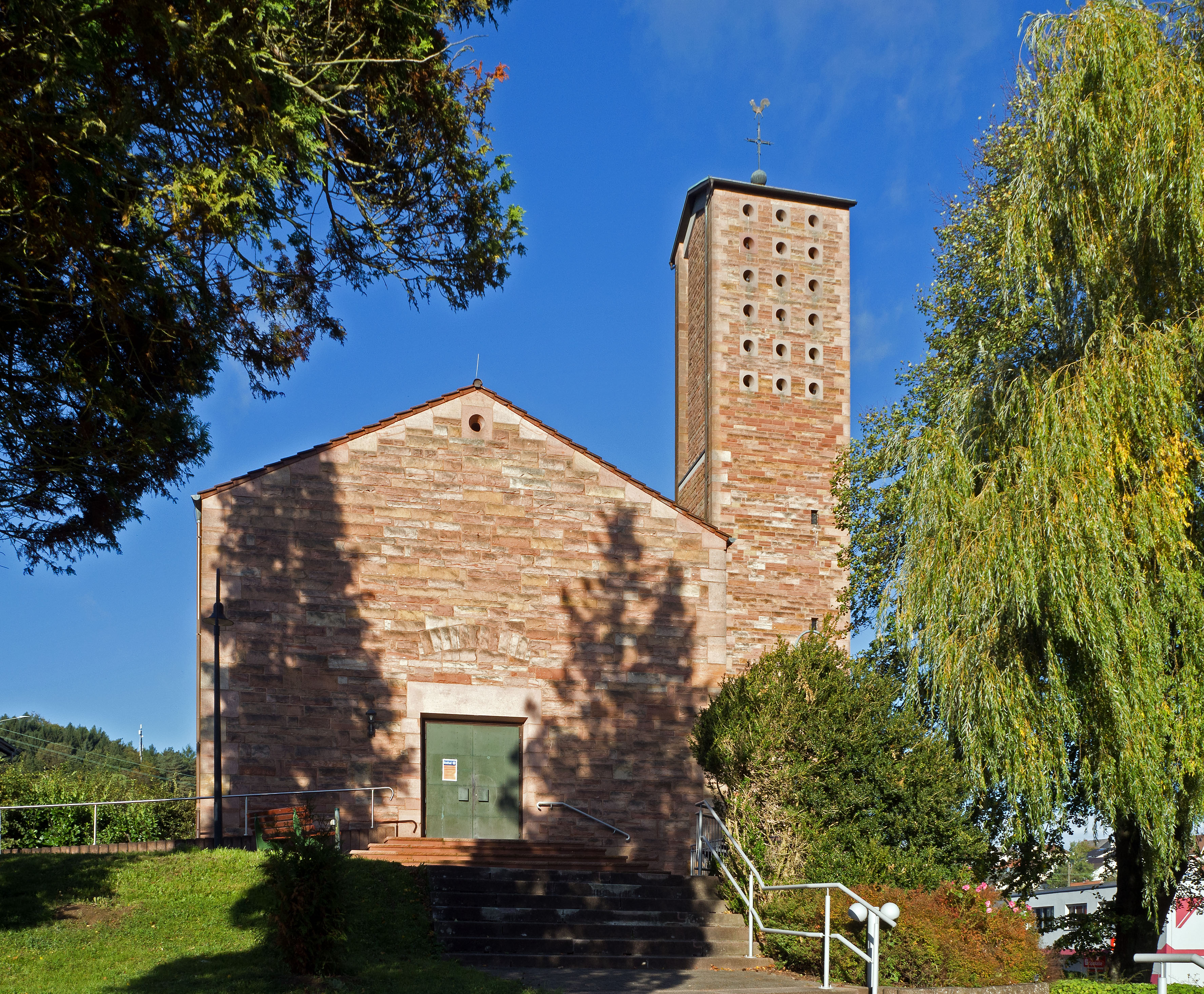
Protestant church

=== Regular Events ===
- Village festival on 2nd weekend in July
- Sports festival on the 1st weekend in August
- Church fair on the 2nd weekend in October
- Christmas market on the 1st Advent weekend

== Transport ==
Bechhofen lies directly on the Landesstraße L 463 state road. The nearby A 6 federal highway (E 50) can be reached via the Waldmohr junction at a distance of 4.5 km. The nearest train station with Intercity-Express stop is in Homburg, 7 km away.

== Personalities ==
- Jakob Pirro (1899–1962), politician (NSDAP)
- Thomas Dooley (* 1961), soccer player.
