= Waldfischbach-Burgalben =

- Municipality
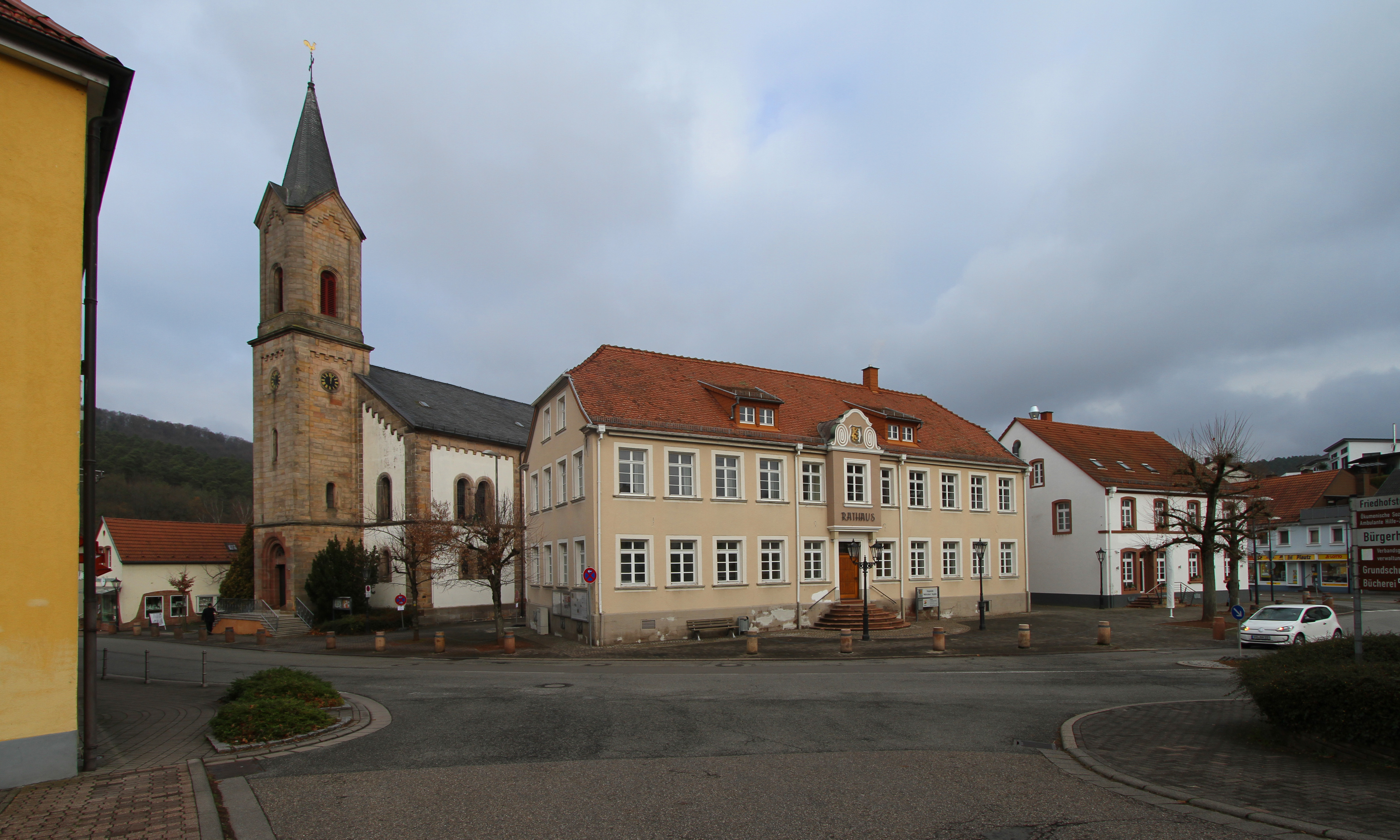

- Coat of arms

- Location of Waldfischbach-Burgalben within Südwestpfalz district
- Interactive map of Waldfischbach-Burgalben
- Location within Germany Location within Rhineland-Palatinate
- Coordinates: 49°17′05″N 7°39′15″E
- Country: Germany
- State: Rhineland-Palatinate
- District: Südwestpfalz
- Municipal assoc.: Waldfischbach-Burgalben

Government
  - Mayor (2019–24): Michael Oestreicher

Area
  - Total: 17.61 km^{2} (6.80 sq mi)
- Elevation: 250–280 m (820–920 ft)

Population (2025-12-31)
  - Total: 4,185
  - Density: 237.6/km^{2} (615.5/sq mi)
- Time zone: UTC+01:00 (CET)
  - Summer (DST): UTC+02:00 (CEST)
- Postal codes: 67714
- Dialling codes: 06333
- Vehicle registration: PS
- Website: www.waldfischbach-burgalben.de

Waldfischbach-Burgalben (Palatine German: Waldfischbach-Bojalwe) is a municipality in the Südwestpfalz district, in Rhineland-Palatinate, Germany. It is situated on the western edge of the Palatinate Forest, approx. 10 km northeast of Pirmasens. Waldfischbach-Burgalben is also located near Pulaski Barracks, Kapaun and Vogelweh Air Force Base.

Waldfischbach-Burgalben is the seat of the Verbandsgemeinde ("collective municipality") Waldfischbach-Burgalben.

This town is twinned with Carentan, in Lower Normandy (France).
