= Otterbach (Verbandsgemeinde) =

Former municipality in Rhineland-Palatinate, Germany

Coordinates: 49.483°N 7.733°E

Otterbach is a former Verbandsgemeinde ("collective municipality") in the district of Kaiserslautern, Rhineland-Palatinate, Germany. The seat of the Verbandsgemeinde was in Otterbach. On 1 July 2014 it merged into the new Verbandsgemeinde Otterbach-Otterberg.

The Verbandsgemeinde Otterbach consisted of the following Ortsgemeinden ("local municipalities"):

1. Frankelbach
2. Hirschhorn
3. Katzweiler
4. Mehlbach
5. Olsbrücken
6. Otterbach
7. Sulzbachtal
