= Otterberg (Verbandsgemeinde) =

Former municipality in Rhineland-Palatinate, Germany

Coordinates: 49.500°N 7.767°E

Otterberg is a former Verbandsgemeinde ("collective municipality") in the district of Kaiserslautern, Rhineland-Palatinate, Germany. The seat of the Verbandsgemeinde was in Otterberg. On 1 July 2014 it merged into the new Verbandsgemeinde Otterbach-Otterberg.

The Verbandsgemeinde Otterberg consisted of the following Ortsgemeinden ("local municipalities"):

1. Heiligenmoschel
2. Niederkirchen
3. Otterberg
4. Schallodenbach
5. Schneckenhausen
