= Otterbach (disambiguation) =

Otterbach is a municipality in Rhineland-Palatinate, Germany.

Otterbach may also refer to:

== Populated places ==
- Otterbach (Verbandsgemeinde), a former Verbandsgemeinde ("collective municipality") in Rhineland-Palatinate, Germany
- Otterbach-Otterberg, a current Verbandsgemeinde ("collective municipality") in Rhineland-Palatinate, Germany
- Kačji Potok (German name Otterbach), a settlement in the municipality of Kočevje in southern Slovenia
- Otterbach, a former municipality today part of Linden, Switzerland

== Rivers ==
- Otterbach (Bühler), a river of Baden-Württemberg, Germany, tributary of the Bühler
- Otterbach (Rhine), a river of Rhineland-Palatinate, Germany, tributary of the Upper Rhine
- Otterbach (Inde), a river of North Rhine-Westphalia, Germany, tributary of the Inde
- Otterbach (Weser), a river of North Rhine-Westphalia and Lower Saxony, Germany, tributary of the Weser
- Otterbach (Danube), a river of Bavaria, Germany, tributary of the Danube
- Otterbach (Klosterbeurener Bach), a river of Bavaria, Germany, tributary of the Klosterbeurener Bach
- Otterbach (Pulsnitz), a river of Saxony, Germany, tributary of the Pulsnitz
