= Olsbrücken =

- Municipality
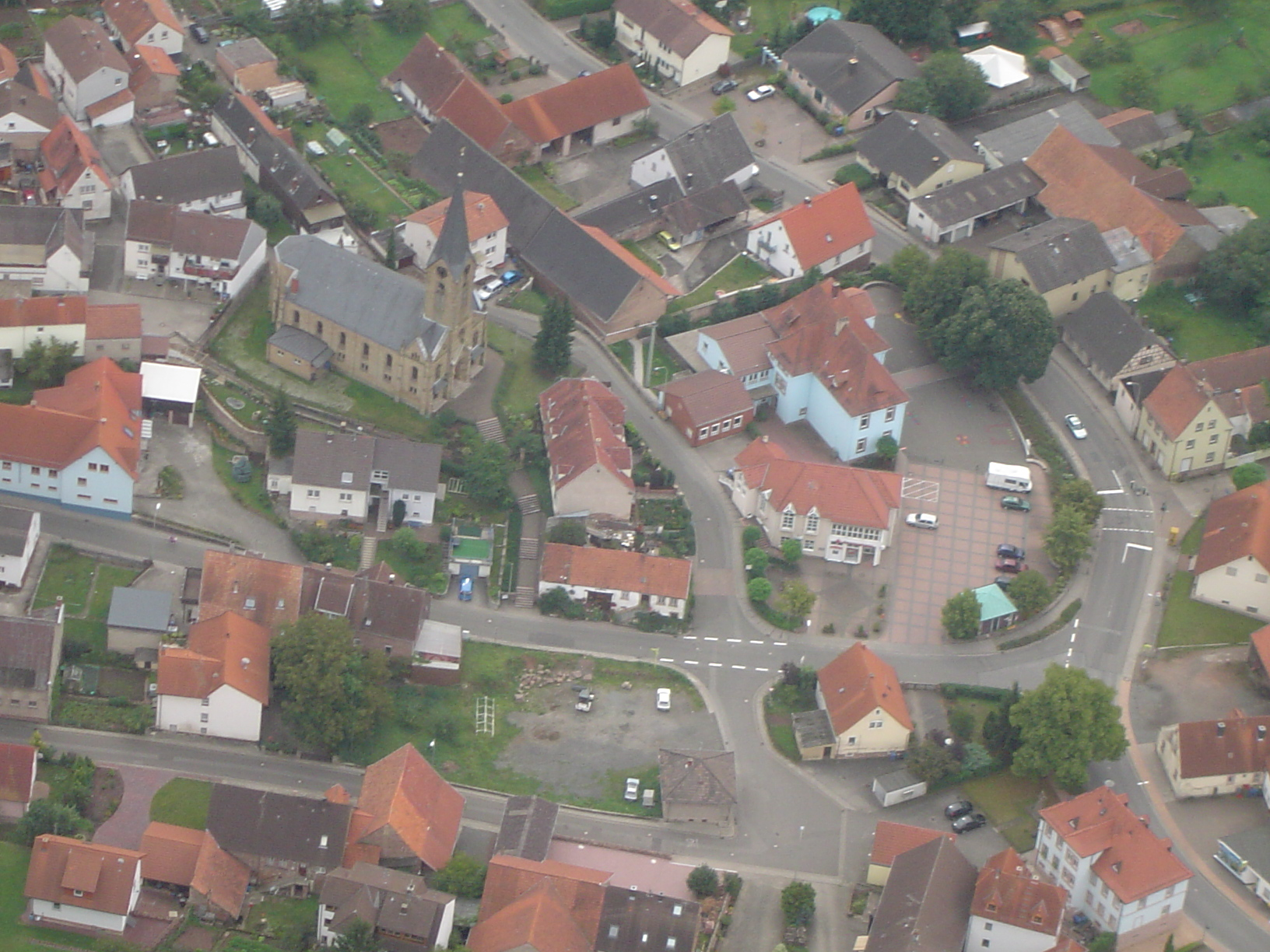
- Aerial view

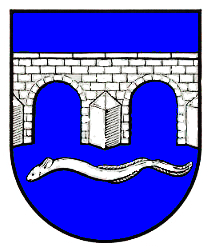
- Coat of arms

- Location of Olsbrücken within Kaiserslautern district
- Interactive map of Olsbrücken
- Location within Germany Location within Rhineland-Palatinate
- Coordinates: 49°32′25″N 7°39′40″E
- Country: Germany
- State: Rhineland-Palatinate
- District: Kaiserslautern
- Municipal assoc.: Otterbach-Otterberg

Government
  - Mayor (2019–24): Walter Schneck (SPD)

Area
  - Total: 7.22 km^{2} (2.79 sq mi)
- Elevation: 209 m (686 ft)

Population (2025-12-31)
  - Total: 1,019
  - Density: 141/km^{2} (366/sq mi)
- Time zone: UTC+01:00 (CET)
  - Summer (DST): UTC+02:00 (CEST)
- Postal codes: 67737
- Dialling codes: 06308
- Vehicle registration: KL
- Website: www.olsbruecken.de

Olsbrücken is a municipality in the district of Kaiserslautern, in Rhineland-Palatinate, western Germany.

== Geographical ==
Olsbrücken is situated in the northern part of the district of Kaiserslautern. There it can be found in the valley of the small river Lauter which is surrounded by the hills of the Nordpfälzer Bergland.

=== Neighbours ===
The boundary of the community which is sized as much as 2.78 sq mi borders on the north to the village of Kreimbach-Kaulbach, Wörsbach on the northeast, Schallodenbach on the east, Mehlbach on the southeast, Hirschhorn/Pfalz on the south and Sulzbachtal and Frankelbach on the west.

=== Local geography ===
The roads inside the village are named in alphabetical order: Am Berg, Am Hanhgraben, Am Rutzenbach, Am Waldhof, Auf den Wingerten, Bachstraße, Bahnhofstraße, Bornweg, Dietenbachstraße, Hauptstraße, Hebelstraße, Hohlstraße, Im Holzgraben, Im Kirschgarten, Kirchweg, Schneidersäcker und Wörsbacher Straße. There is also a road named Am Habel, but it is actually only a pathway to one single private house. The train station of Olsbrücken is placed a few metres outside of the local boundaries, so the ground there belongs to the village of Frankelbach. Nevertheless, the stations name is Olsbrücken. The local subboundaries are very small parts. Regarding to the history of splitting farming ground into parts as a reason of heritage, one should not be surprised that over 100 different names can be found in ground maps. Not only a few of them are still in use in the common language of the inhabitants. E.g. people say that they go onto the Oberberg, if the walk to the hut of the Pfälzerwaldverein. And in fact the area there is named Oberberg in ground maps.

In the past there were two mills shaping the impression of the village - the Neumühle in the north and the Oppensteiner Mühle in the south. The building of the Neumühle is still standing at the exit of the village towards Kreimbach-Kaulbach. Today it is out of order and used as a block of flats for rent. The Oppensteiner Mühle does not exist anymore. The last parts of the building were removed during a straightening of the B 270 at the end of the 1970s. Today there is a well called Oppensteiner Brunnen and some old stones next to the road the only thing that is left of that mill.

The name "Auf den Wingerten" reminds that in past there must have been a vineyard inside the boundaries of the village. There are two forests as well inside the boundaries of Olsbrücken. The bigger of them is named Tierwald, the smaller Seiderswald. Inside the Tierwald the well of the Schlangenbrunnen can be found.

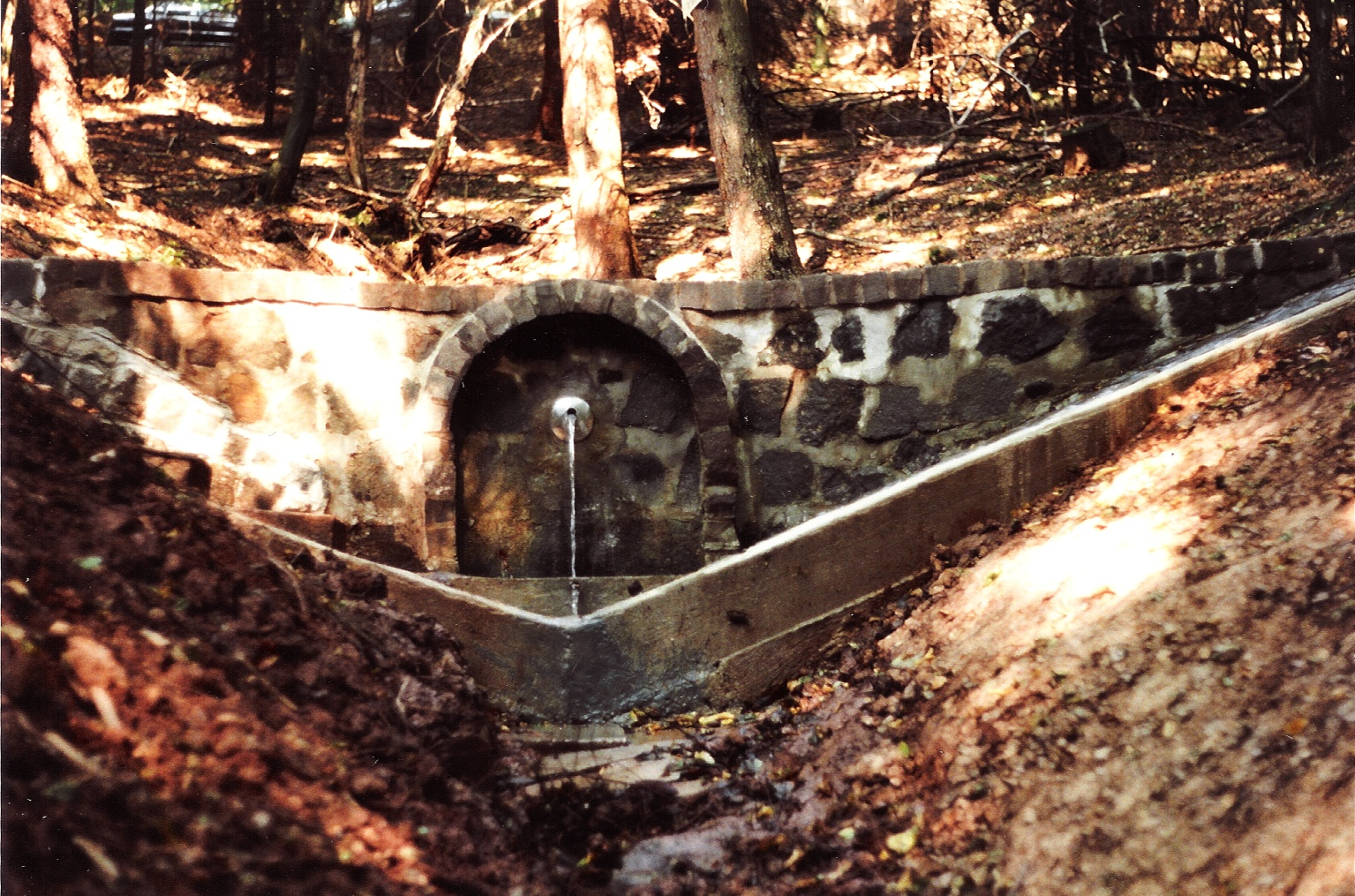
Schlangenbrunnen Olsbrücken

== Climate ==
The Palatinate has one of the mildest climates of Germany, as it is situated west of the river Rhine and influenced by maritime western winds. In the Westpfalz area the climate is cooler than at the Rhine valley, but it is still unusual to have longer periods of ice and snow in the winter time. The next weather station with a similar climate can be found at the city of Kaiserslautern.

== History ==
The area around Olsbrücken was already settled in the times of the Roman Empire. A proof of that can still be found not far away at the neighbouring village of Kreimbach-Kaulbach, where there are the ruins of the Roman Heidenburg. If there has been a settlement within the boundaries of the village is not known. In the Middle Ages around the year 1250 there is a certificate available that speaks about a man called Ludovicus (Ludwig) who came from Alsbrücken. Afterwards the name changed to Holszbrücken and Olszbrücken.

At the Thirty Years' War the palatinate suffered from severe and horrible destruction. A lot of villages were uninhabited at the end. In 1635, 15 km away from Olsbrücken at Kaiserslautern, that was occupied by Spanish troops that time, forces of mostly Croatian origin slaughtered at least 90% of the inhabitants. Most likely the Olsbrücken area was also affected from that battle and two settlements close to the village were destroyed and never rebuilt.

After the war the area was populated by settlers from Wallonia, Switzerland, the Allgäu and other mostly Catholic areas. The reason was, that these people were from Protestant confession and they hoped to practice their religion without fearing punishment. At the end of the 18th century, the western parts of the Kurpfalz was occupied by French forces and became a part of the French Empire for some years. French became than official language until 1815. The French government made administrative reforms and the Code civil became a legal law. Olsbrücken belonged to the Departement du Mont Tonnere and the administrative responsibility was delegated to the city of Otterberg. After 1815 the palatinate became a part of the Bavarian kingdom. But the Bavarians didn't rescind the French administrative changes. Otterberg was also in Bavarian times the administrative centre for Olsbrücken, where people hat to go to court, etc.

During the 19th century a lot of people from Olsbrücken and the surrounding villages emigrated to the United States of America, because poverty was a part of their everyday life. The remarkable Protestant church was built in the late 19th century according to plans from the architect Ludwig Levy.

After World War II Olsbrücken became a part of the new founded federal Land of Rheinland-Pfalz. Since then it still belonged to Bavaria. The village extended its populated area within development areas like Am Waldhof, Am Rutzenbach, Im Kirschgarten and lately Auf den Wingerten.

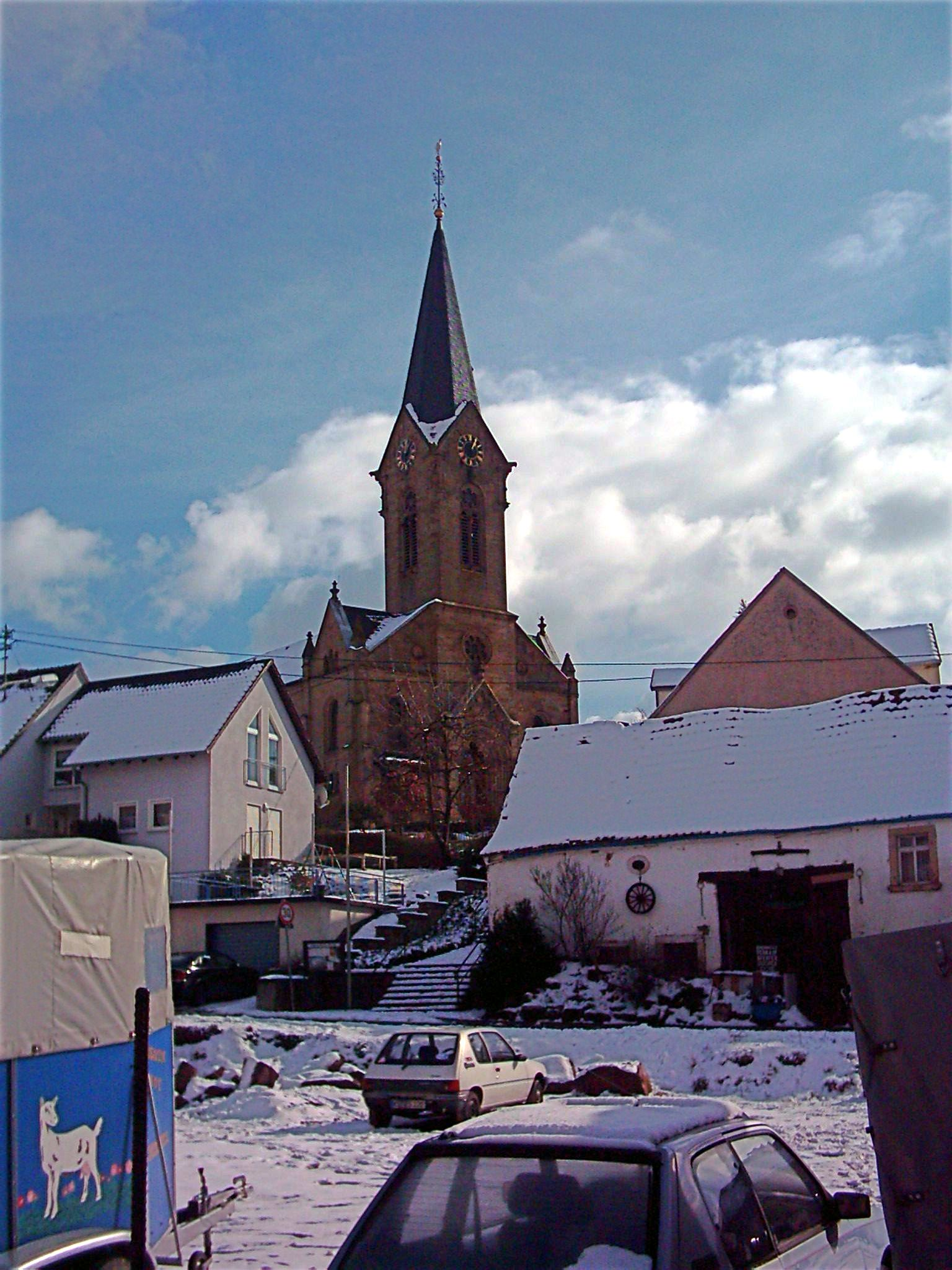
Olsbrücken Protestant Church

== Religion ==
In 2007 60.8% of the inhabitants believed in Protestant confession and 23.7% in Roman Catholic confession. The rest was of other beliefs or without a religious belief.

== Communal government ==
The local council consists of 16 members and is elected every five years. The mayor of the village is in honorary office.

Mayors of the village

- 1981–1989 Arthur Hesch (CDU)
- 1989–2004 Gerhard Klein (SPD)
- 2004–2008 Regina Hill (SPD)
- 2008–2019 Peter Hesch (CDU)
- since 2019 Walter Schneck (SPD)

== Coat of arms ==
The official coat of arms of the village shows an eel and a bridge. It symbolizes the original meaning of the villages name Alsbrücken (Eel bridge).

== Traffic ==
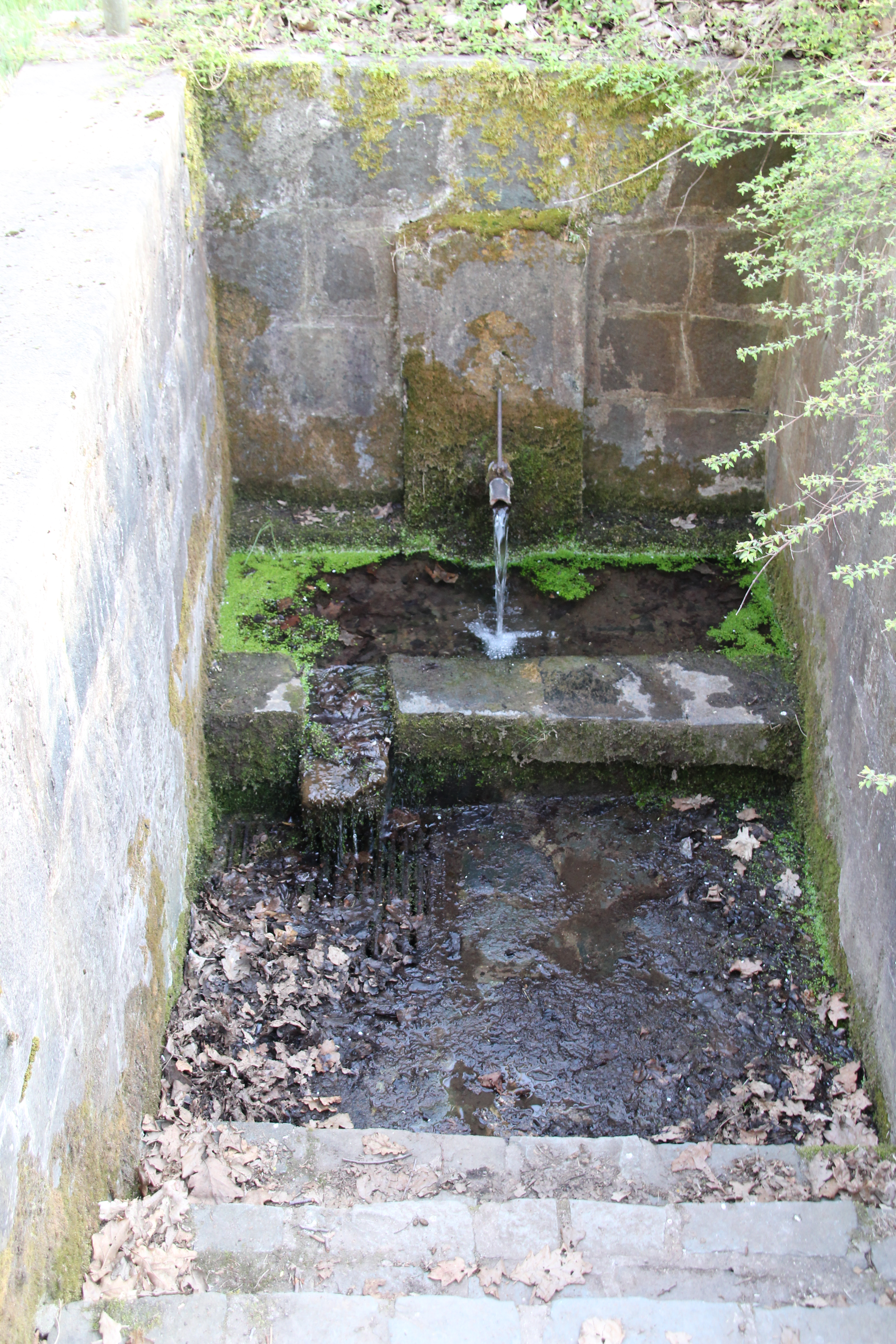
Oppensteiner Brunnen

The Lauter Valley Railway connects Olsbrücken with Lauterecken and Kaiserslautern. The main road is the B 270 which starts at Pirmasens and ends at Idar-Oberstein. The Autobahn A6 has an entry about 15 km away from the village at Kaiserslautern.

== Education ==
Olsbrücken has an elementary school and a public library.
