= Bossong =

Bossong is a surname common to Rhineland-Palatinate in Germany and Alsace in France.

== Surname history ==
The Bossong family is of Frankish origin. This is neither Teutonic nor French, but a separate race, almost extinct today.

When William the Conqueror of Normandy invaded England in 1066, early variations of the name were in his invading army. For their services in the conquest of England, they were awarded large estates in County Norfolk where the family may still be found.

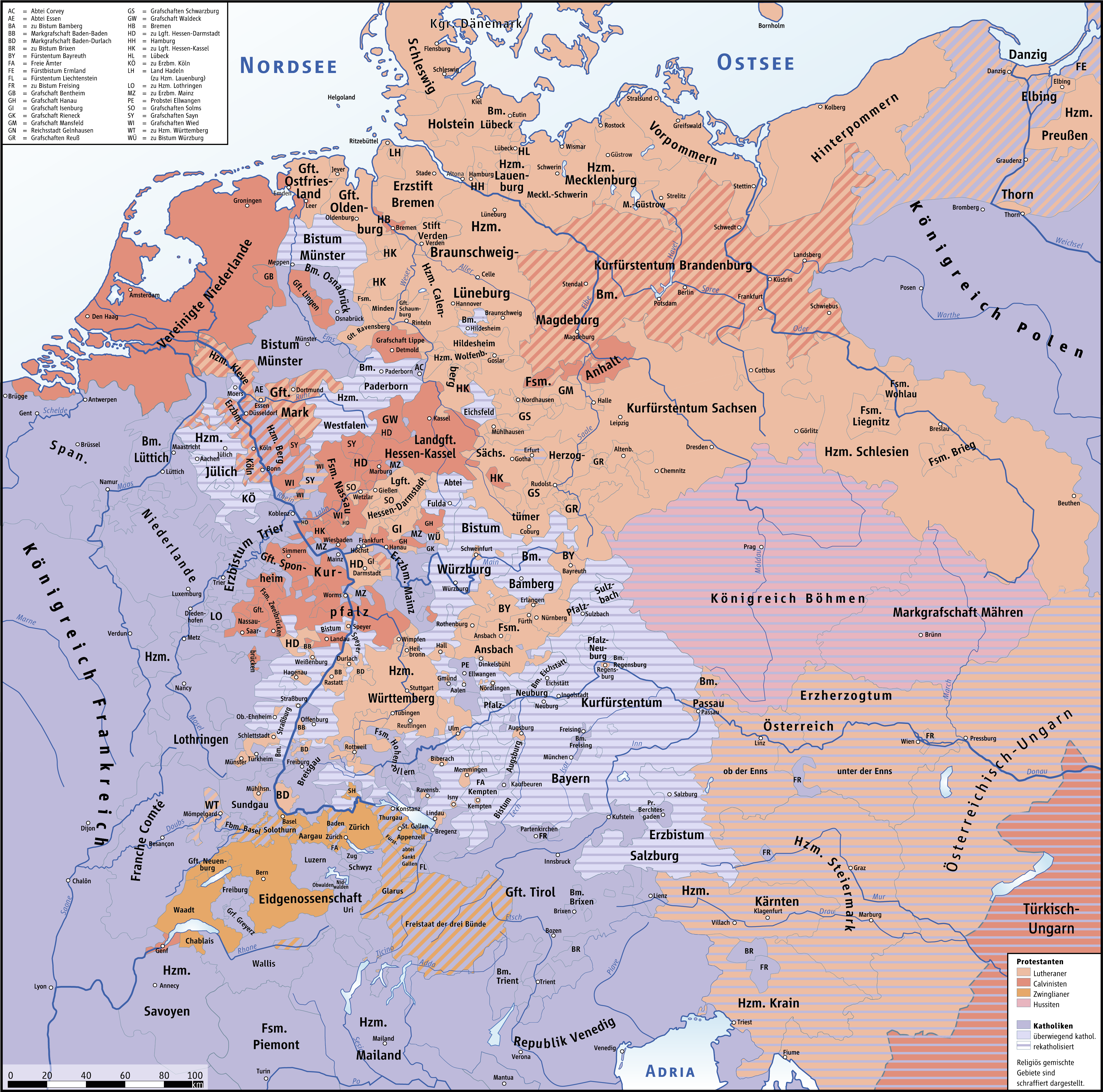
Religions of the Holy Roman Empire in 1618

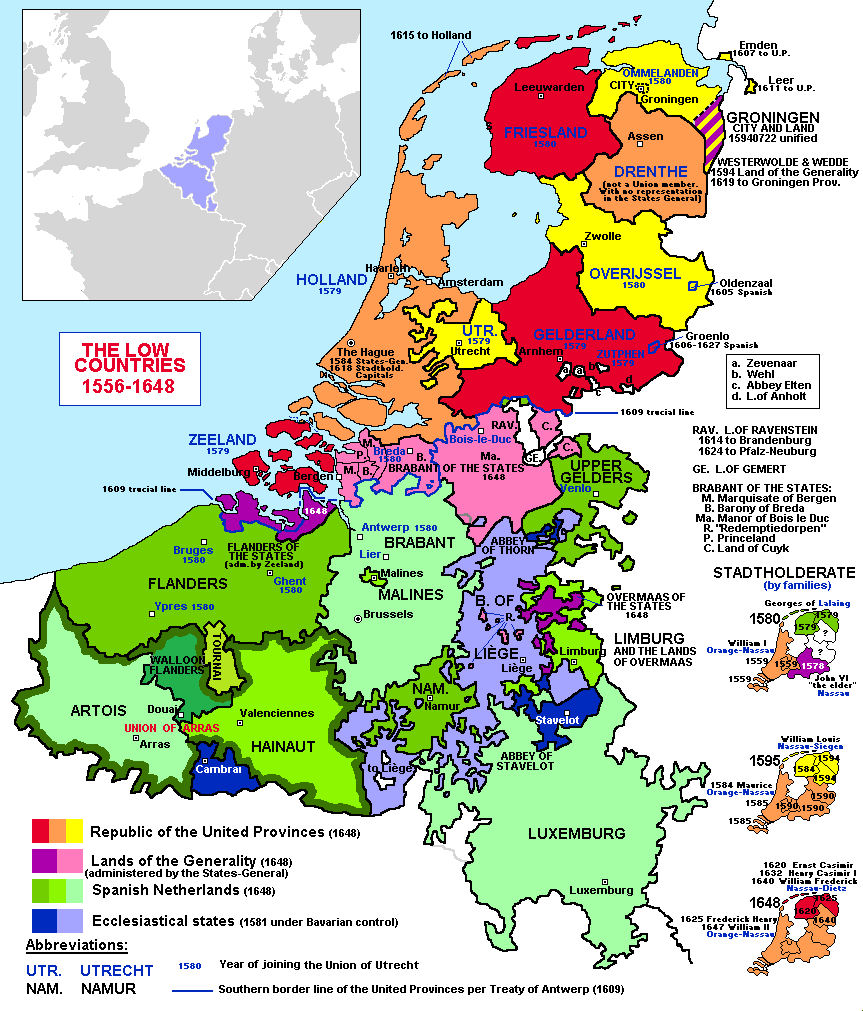
The Low Countries 1556-1684

History of the Low Countries (schematic)
Frisii		Germanic tribes		Belgae & Celts			
Frisii	Cana– nefates (Note: Roman foederati)	Chamavi, Tubantes (Note: The Chamavi merged into the confederation of the Franks; the Tubantes merged into the confederation of the Saxons.)		Gallia Belgica (55 BC–c. 5th century AD); Germania Inferior (83–c. 5th century)			
Frisii	Cana– nefates	Salian Franks		Batavi			
unpopulated (4th –c. 5th centuries)		Saxons	Salian Franks (4th–c. 5th centuries)				
Frisian Kingdom (c. 6th century – 734)		Saxons	Frankish Kingdom (481–843)—Carolingian Empire (800–843)				
Frisian Kingdom (c. 6th century – 734)		Austrasia (511–687)					
Middle Francia (843–855)				West; Francia (from 843)	Middle Francia (843–855)		
Kingdom of Lotharingia (Note: Part of East Francia after 939, divided in Upper Lorraine (as part of West Francia) and Lower Lorraine (as part of East Francia) in 959.) (855–959); Duchy of Lower Lorraine (Note: Lower Lorraine—also referred to as Lothier—disintegrated into several smaller independent territories and only the title of a "Duke of Lothier" remained, held by Brabant.) (from 959)			Kingdom of Lotharingia (855–959); Duchy of Lower Lorraine (from 959)	West; Francia (from 843)	Kingdom of Lotharingia (855–959); Duchy of Lower Lorraine (from 959)		
Frisia			Kingdom of Lotharingia (855–959); Duchy of Lower Lorraine (from 959)	County of Flanders (Note: Including County of Artois (part of Flanders until 1237) and Tournaisis.) (862–1384)	Kingdom of Lotharingia (855–959); Duchy of Lower Lorraine (from 959)		
Frisian; Freedom (Note: Lordship of Frisia and Lordship of Groningen (including the Ommelanden) after 1524 and 1536 respectively.) (11th–16th centuries)	County of Holland (Note: Including County of Zeeland, that was ruled by neighboring County of Holland and County of Flanders (until 1432).) (880–1432)	Bishopric of Utrecht (Note: Utrecht included Lordship of Overijssel (until 1528), County of Drenthe (until 1528) and County of Zutphen (until 1182).) (695–1456)	Duchy of Brabant (Note: Duchy of Brabant included since 1288 also the Duchy of Limburg (now part of Belgium's Liège Province) and the "Overmaas" lands Dalhem, Valkenburg and Herzogenrath (now part of the Dutch Province of Limburg).) (1183–1430) Duchy of Guelders (Note: The county, later duchy, of Guelders consisted of four quarters, as they were separated by rivers: situated upstream Upper Quarter (the present day northern half of the Dutch province of Limburg), spatially separated from the three downstream Lower Quarters: County of Zutphen (after 1182), Veluwe Quarter and Nijmegen Quarter. The three lower quarters emerged from the historic gau Hamaland (named after the Chamavi tribe), and formed the present day province of Gelderland. Guelders did not include the Cleves enclave Huissen and the independent counties of Buren and Culemborg, that were much later seceded to the province of Gelderland.) (1046–1543)	County of Flanders (862–1384)	County of Hainaut (1071–1432) County of Namur (981–1421)	Prince- Bishopric of Liège (Note: Throughout the Middle Ages, the bishopric was further expanded with the Duchy of Bouillon in 1096 (ceded to France in 1678), the acquisition of the county of Loon in 1366 and the county of Horne in 1568. The Lordship of Mechelen was also part of the Prince-Bishopric of Liège.)(980–1791)	Duchy of Luxembourg (1059–1443)
Frisian; Freedom (11th–16th centuries)	Burgundian Netherlands (1384–1482)					Prince- Bishopric of Liège (980–1791)	Burgundian Netherlands (1384–1482)
Habsburg Netherlands (1482–1795) (Seventeen Provinces after 1543) (Note: The name Seventeen Provinces came in use after the Habsburg emperor Charles V had re-acquired the Duchy of Guelders, and an continuous territory arose.)						Prince- Bishopric of Liège (980–1791)	Habsburg Netherlands (1482–1795) (Seventeen Provinces after 1543)
Dutch Republic (1581–1795)				Spanish Netherlands (1556–1714)		Prince- Bishopric of Liège (980–1791)	Spanish Netherlands (1556–1714)
Dutch Republic (1581–1795)				Austrian Netherlands (1714–1795)		Prince- Bishopric of Liège (980–1791)	Austrian Netherlands (1714–1795)
Dutch Republic (1581–1795)				United States of Belgium (1790)		Republic of Liège (1789–'91)	United States of Belgium (1790)
Dutch Republic (1581–1795)				Austrian Netherlands (1795–1797)		P.-Bish. of Liège (1791–1794)	Austrian Netherlands (1795–1797)
Batavian Republic (1795–1806); Kingdom of Holland (1806–1810)			associated with French First Republic (1795–1804) part of First French Empire (1804–1815)				
part of First French Empire (1810–1813)			associated with French First Republic (1795–1804) part of First French Empire (1804–1815)				
Sovereign Principality of the Netherlands (1813–1815)			associated with French First Republic (1795–1804) part of First French Empire (1804–1815)				
United Kingdom of the Netherlands (1815–1830)							Grand Duchy of Luxembourg (from 1815)
Kingdom of the Netherlands (from 1839)				Kingdom of Belgium (from 1830)			Grand Duchy of Luxembourg (from 1815)
Kingdom of the Netherlands (from 1839)				Kingdom of Belgium (from 1830)			Grand Duchy of Luxembourg (from 1890)

They were likely Huguenots or Walloons as records indicate they fled Catholic persecutions during the 16th and 17th centuries. In 1572 the family suffered the persecutions of many families and refused to accept the doctrines of the Roman Catholic Church. To avoid this persecution, many families left the domains of the French King and fled to County Kent, England and Holland.

Again in the latter part of the 17th century, those who remained in France suffered persecution and fled.

Genealogical researcher Heinrich Herzog notes that the family name can be found in the Habsburgs Low Countries. During the Thirty Years' War, the Lambrecht Wallonians fled in 1621 from approaching Spanish soldiers, for example, to Bergzabern, a small town which belonged to the neutral principality Pfalz-Zweibrücken. In 1635, they escaped again from imperial troops choosing Annweiler and Bischweiler in Alsace which both belonged to Pfalz-Zweibrücken, Hanau on the river Main, and possibly to Malmedy. In the first three places, there are found bearers of the name Botzon. Starting in the 1640s, Johann Botzon is mentioned often in the council minutes of the city of Kaiserslautern.

The Bossong surname has existed in and around the town of Kaiserslautern in the Rhineland-Palatinate for the past several hundred years. The earliest known cited person with the surname Bossong was Johann Ägidius Bossong, who was born approximately 1642 in Schallodenbach.

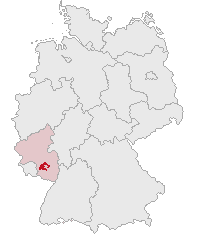
Current Kaiserslautern district in Rhineland-Palatinate

== Cultural origins ==
The Franks were the race of Charlemagne, the Pepins, Dagobert I, and Charles Martel. Their capital was at Aix-la-Chappell (Aachen) in present-day North Rhine-Westphalia, near the borders of Belgium and the Netherlands. The Bossong family seat was in the town of Bussang which lies in present-day Lorraine.

Although most of the Bossongs found in Schallodenbach and surrounding farm villages were Catholic, some early church records suggest that Calvinist Bossongs lived in Heiligenmoschel and Schneckenhausen, a significant Protestant territory under the House of Sickingen who were Free Imperial Knights. As noted earlier in this article, it appears early Bossongs were Huguenots or Walloons.

In Europe today, variations of the name can be found in several countries from the western and southern parts of the former Holy Roman Empire of the German Nation - Germany, France, Belgium, the Netherlands, Italy, and England.

== Various spellings ==
The spelling of the name changed over the years, and may have started as Bandeson. The general evolution of the surname, starting in the 14th century, appears to be as follows: Bodechon --> Bodeson --> Bodson --> Botzong --> Bossong. Variations of these spellings include Bodecon, Baudeson, Baudesson, Baudeschon, Baudisson, Boudecon, Boudosson, Bootson, Botson, Botzon, Botzung, Bozon, Boson, Bosson, Bossung, and Bossing. Other possible German variations of the name include Bösing, Boesing, Bousin, and Bousing.

== Immigration to the United States ==
Along with about 1.2 million other Germans, many Bossongs emigrated from Europe in the late 19th century while war ravaged central Europe. The most popular immigration to the United States for the Germans was New York.

Today, a significant number of people with the Bossong/Bossung spellings of the name reside in New York, New Jersey, Pennsylvania, Ohio, Kentucky, Missouri, Indiana, and Illinois.

== Notable people, places, and businesses ==
Businesses

Bossong Hosiery, Asheboro, North Carolina, USA

Bossong's Commercial Delivery, Inc., Syracuse, New York, USA

Cafe Bossong, Rockenhausen, Rhineland-Palatinate, Germany

Bossong Engineering, Welshpool, Western Australia

Bossong SpA, Grassobbio, Bergamo, Lombardy, Italy

People

Franz Bossong, German author, poet, and publisher

Horst Bossong, German sociologist

Nora Bossong, German writer

Georg Bossong, German romanist

Josef Bossong, German member of the Bremen Parliament (Centre, CDU)

Raphael Bossong, German political scientist

Places

Bossung Lake, Bethel, Gosper, Nebraska, USA

Bosson, Liège, Wallonia, Belgium

Bossons Glacier, Haute-Savoie, France

== Miscellaneous links ==
Historic homes and places and genealogical and personal memoirs of Middlesex Cty, MA - pages relating to early Bosson settlers and families.

Massachusetts of today: a memorial of the state, historical and biographical - Bosson pages.

Bosschaerts surname
