= Otterberg Abbey =

Romanesque abbey church in Otterberg, Germany

Otterberg Abbey Church
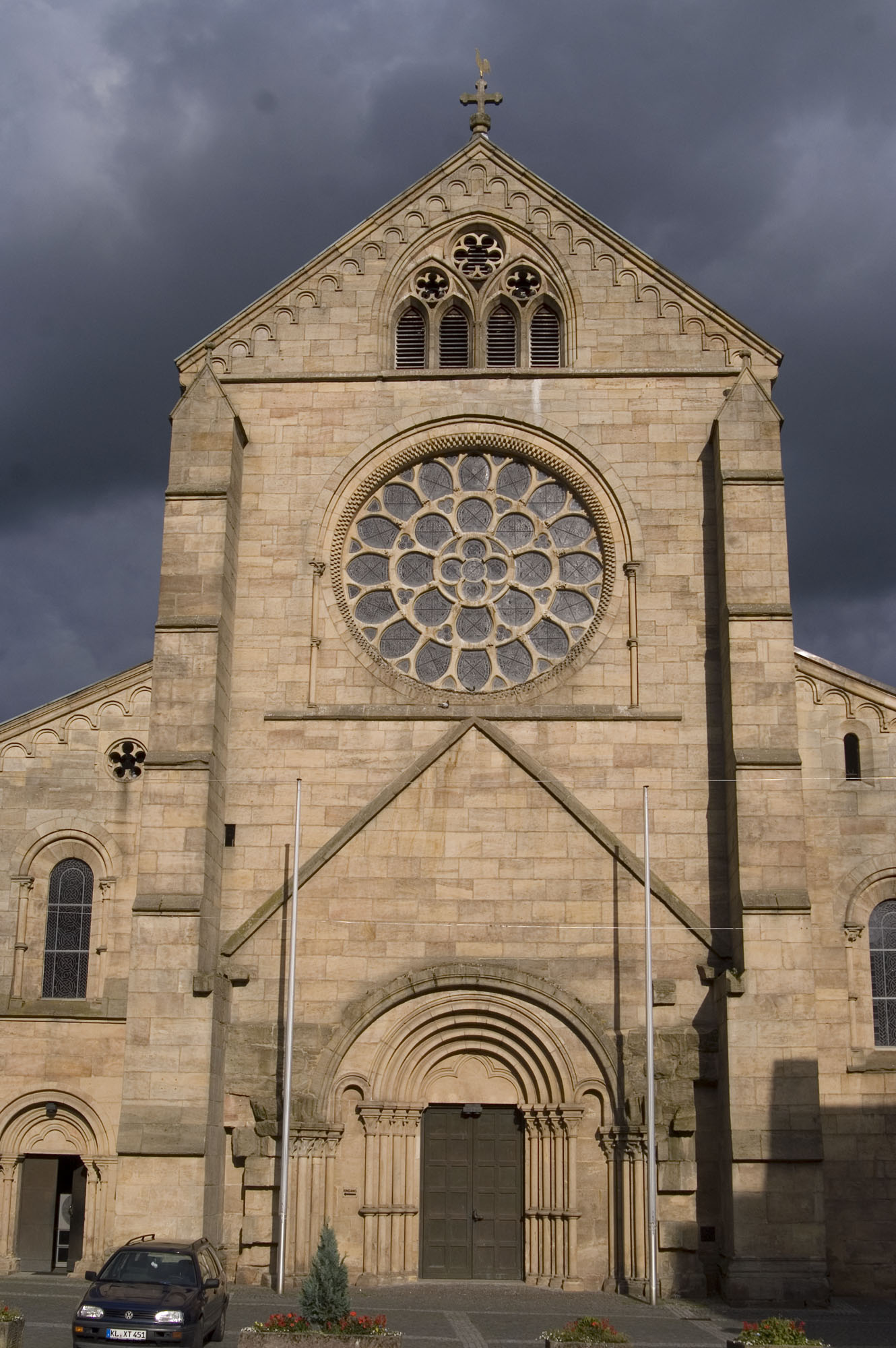
- West facade
- Otterberg Abbey Church
- 49.503007°N 7.773073°E
- Location: Otterberg
- Denomination: Simultaneous (Protestant and Roman Catholic)

History
- Founder: Cistercians

Architecture
- Style: Late Romanesque cruciform pillar basilica
- Completed: 1168–1254

Specifications
- Length: 79.5 m (261 ft)
- Height: 20 m (66 ft)

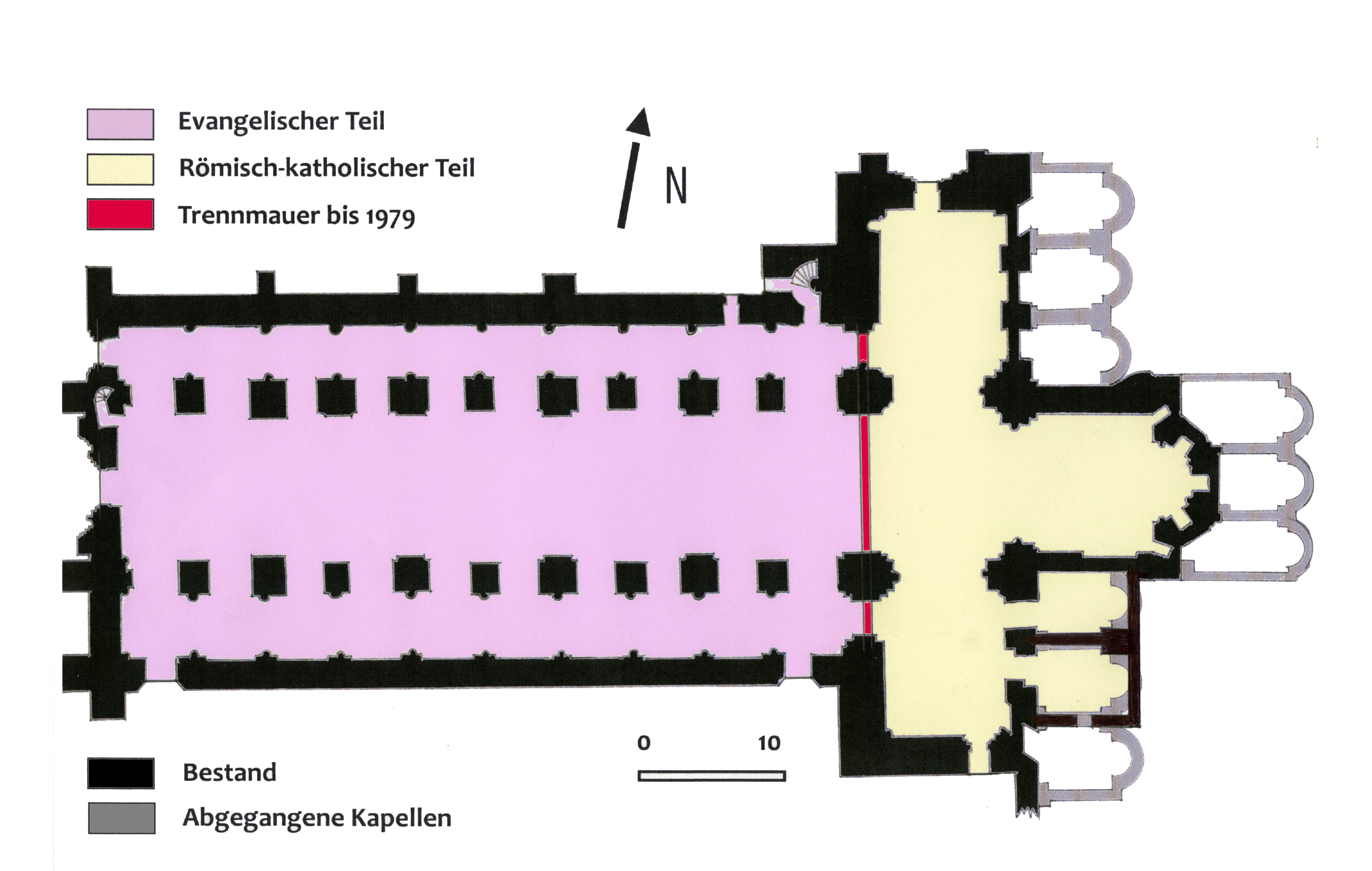
Floor plan of the church

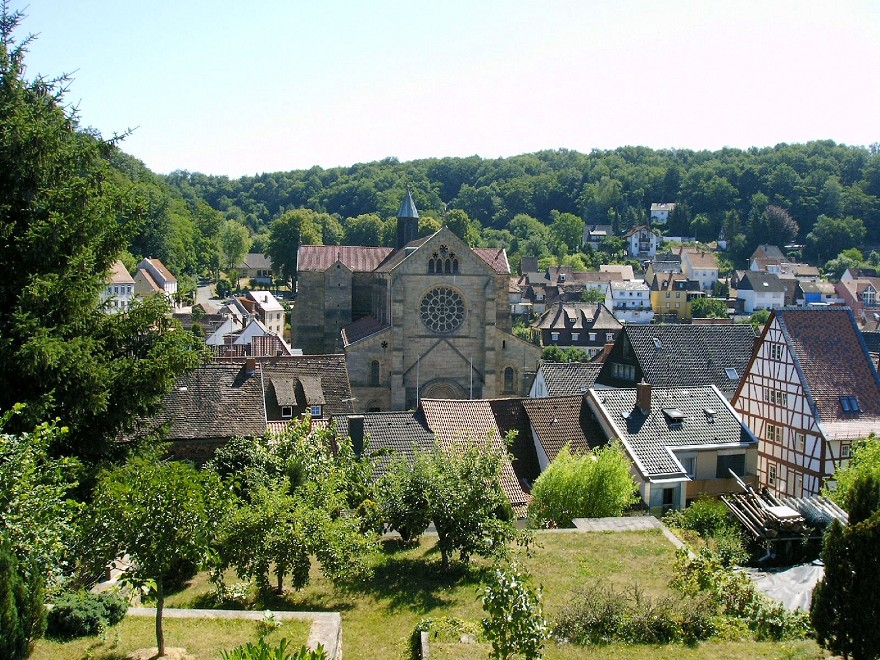
Location of the abbey church in Otterberg

The Otterberg Abbey Church is the Romanesque church of the former Cistercian Otterberg Abbey near Kaiserslautern. After Speyer Cathedral, it is the largest church in the Palatinate. Today it is used as a simultaneous church by the Protestant and Roman Catholic local congregations.

== Geographic location ==
The abbey church formed the center of the abbey and today of the town of Otterberg in the Kaiserslautern district in Rhineland-Palatinate, which is located about 6 kilometers north of Kaiserslautern.

== History ==
=== Construction sequence ===
Construction of the monastery complex on the Otterbach began before 1168. Based on findings dated in part absolutely by dendrochronology, supplemented by relative datings derived from the sequence of mason's marks used, the construction proceeded as follows:

- Foundations before 1168–1177;
- 1180–1199: the lower part of the southern aisle, south transept and choir up to the vault springing, followed by the north transept and the eastern bays of the north aisle and the chapels of the transept.
- 1199–1204: the remaining walls of the transept up to the vault springing were raised and construction of the nave proceeded westward.
- 1204–1211: transept and choir were completed and vaulted. For this, the eastern bays of the nave also had to be erected and vaulted as buttresses for the crossing. Probably a first consecration of choir and transept took place at the end, so that they could be used for worship. The outer wall of the south aisle also reached its final height.
- 1211–1236: the four eastern bays of the main and side aisles were completed up to the vault and the lower part of the west end.
- 1236–1246: the west gable was completed and work was done on the roof. The rose window is dated 1241 by inscription.
- After 1246: the church received its final roof.

In 1253, the convent still lacked the necessary funds to complete the church, but on May 10, 1254, the entire church was consecrated by the auxiliary bishop Arnold of Semgallen in the presence of the Archbishop of Mainz Gerhard I of Dhaun. The patrons were Mary and John the Baptist. There is little information about the history of the church after its completion.

=== After the Reformation ===
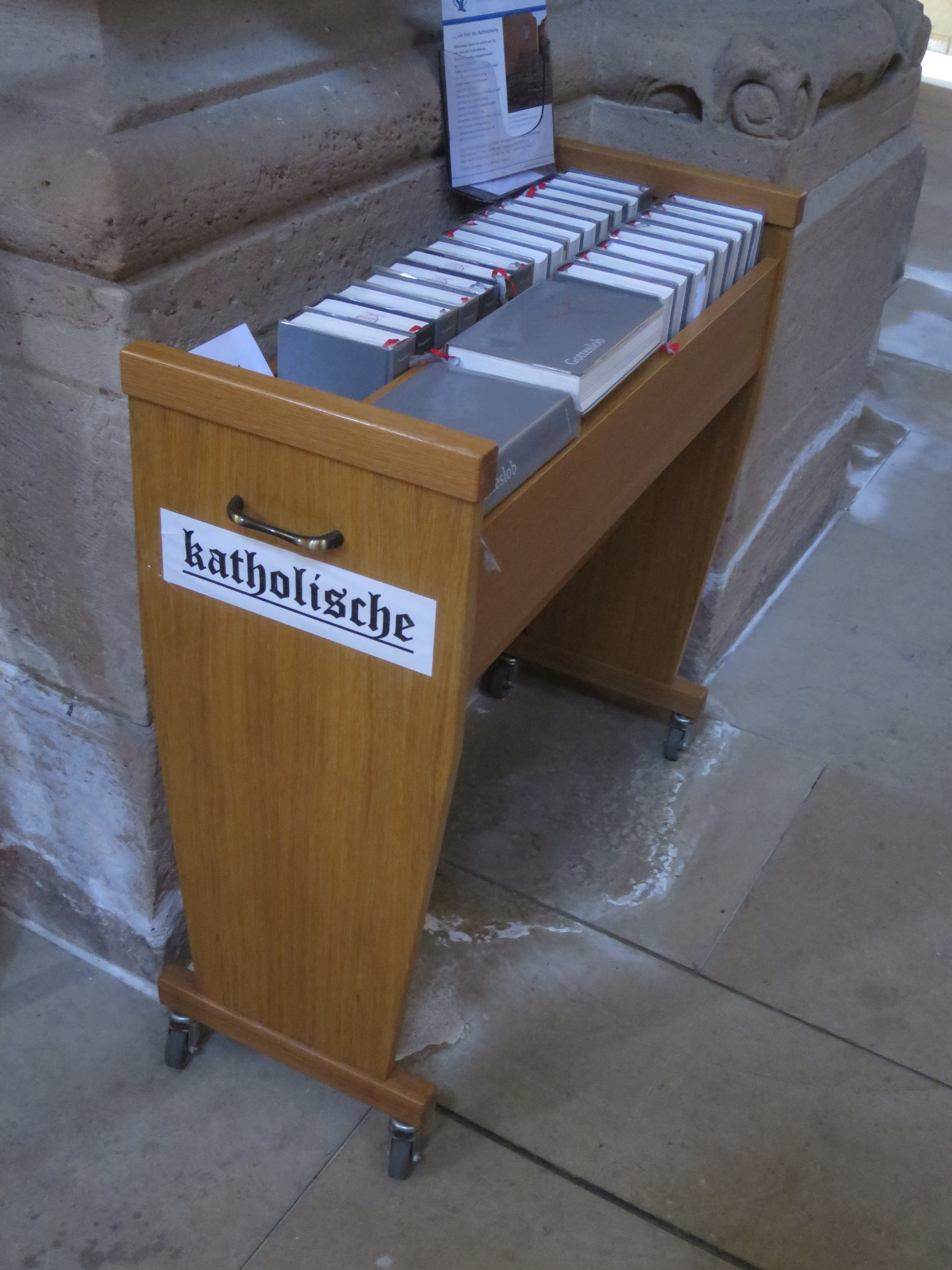
In a simultaneous church, care must be taken that hymnals (Protestant) and Gotteslob (Roman Catholic) do not fall into ecumenical disorder!

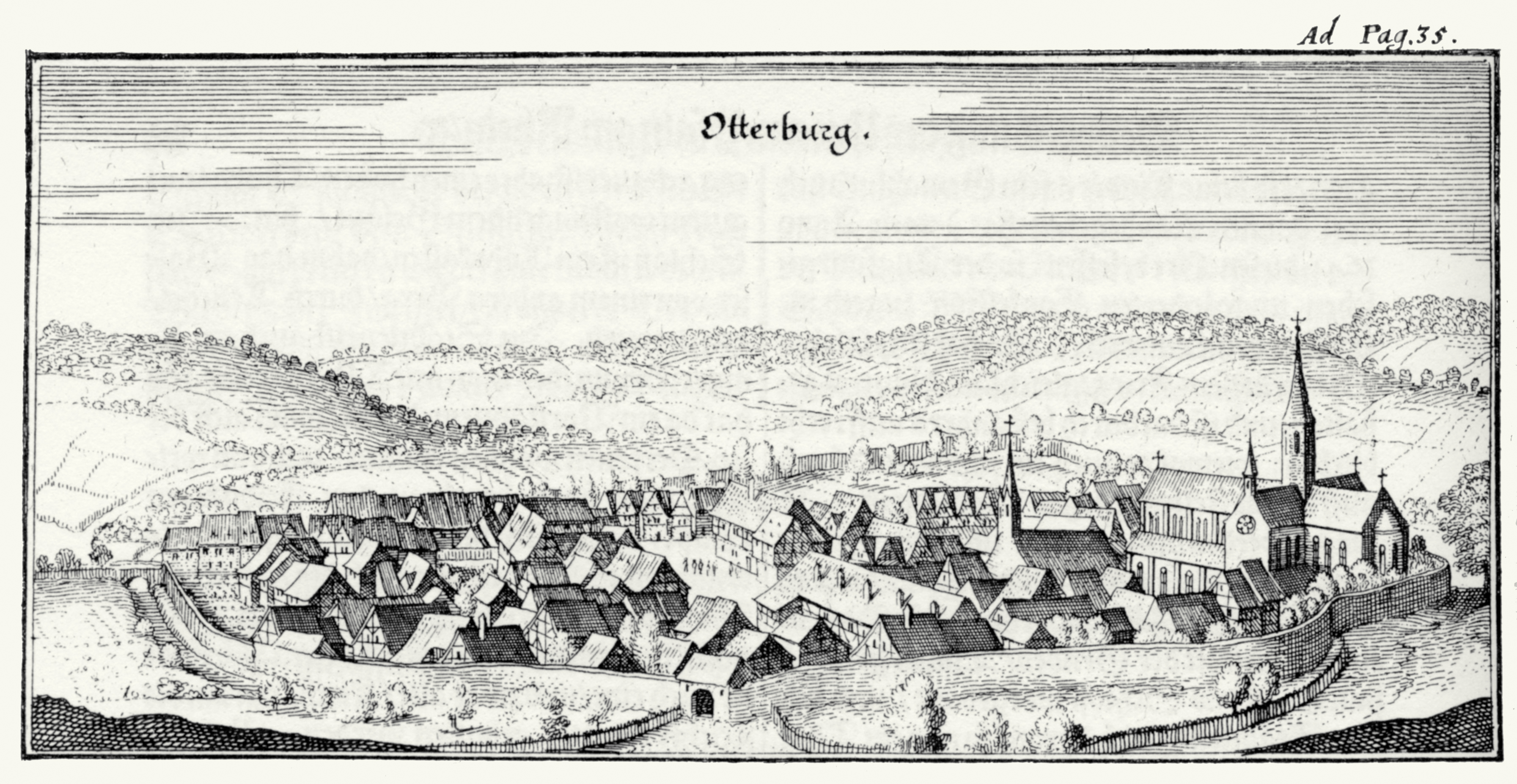
Depiction by Matthäus Merian: Otterberg with the abbey church, mid-17th century

In the course of the Reformation, the monastery fell to the Palatinate around 1560. Count Palatine John Casimir settled Reformed religious refugees, Walloons, from the Spanish Netherlands here from 1579, who now used the former abbey church for their services. However, the church was in poor structural condition: the roof was leaky and rainwater dripped through the vault into the church. The new community received city rights as early as 1581. After a brief flourishing, the Thirty Years' War hit the city hard: in 1622 it was captured by troops of the Catholic League, in 1631 by the Protestant Swedes, and in 1635 again by the League. One third of the houses were destroyed afterward, many families had fled. However, the church building seems to have survived the war relatively unscathed. The damages known from the following period suggest on the one hand rather a lack of building maintenance, on the other hand a major fire occurred in 1670 or 1671, which destroyed the roof and the ridge turret over the crossing.

The population that set about rebuilding Otterberg after the war was divided into three confessions: in 1680 there were 28 Reformed, nine Roman Catholic and eight Lutheran families. In addition, there was the repeated confessional change in the family branches of the Counts Palatine, who ultimately turned to the Roman Catholic confession. This led in 1691 to Count Palatine John William ordering that the Roman Catholics be allowed to share the Reformed former abbey church in Otterberg; in 1698 the right was also granted to the Lutherans. In 1707, a spatial division within the church building took place: choir and transept were assigned to the Roman Catholic community, the nave to the Reformed; in 1708 the separation was also carried out structurally by installing a partition wall. The Lutherans built their own church from 1732 to 1743, which became superfluous in 1830 – after the church union of 1818 – and was demolished.

In 1789, the building was considered at risk of collapse. It was confiscated by the invading French during the Revolutionary Wars and used as a warehouse.

=== Modern era ===
In 1815, the Palatinate came to the Kingdom of Bavaria, and in 1818 the two Protestant confessions united here to form one church. From 1821 to 1831, the former abbey church was thoroughly renovated for the first time. A new drainage system was installed and the floor was raised by 1.5 m–2 m. According to other sources, it was even up to 2.40 m. A wall about 3 m high was built between choir and transept and the separated part became the Roman Catholic sacristy. Furthermore, the apse was separated from the choir by another wall and a bell cage was installed there as a replacement for the – always missing in a Cistercian church – church tower. In the Protestant part, a gallery was installed. Two ridge turrets were placed on the roof, but had to be removed again in 1865. In 1898, a sacristy for the Roman Catholic community was added to the south transept; the corresponding installations in the choir could thus be removed again.

The next renovations followed in 1902 (Protestant part) and 1911 (Roman Catholic part).

In 1970/71, an exterior renovation took place, and a ridge turret based on an engraving by Matthäus Merian was again placed on the crossing as a bell tower. With the partition wall from the beginning of the 18th century, the original spatial impression had been completely lost. It was therefore removed in 1979–1981. A comprehensive renovation followed, led by building director Peter Roth. Since then, the church has been used again as a simultaneous church. The usage rights of both communities remained unaffected. The church benches in the transept continue to serve the Roman Catholic community, the individual chairs in the nave the Protestant one, with both communities using the same altar in the crossing. During the renovation in the 1980s, the medieval drainage system was examined archaeologically, a new drainage system was installed for the second time, and the floor was lowered again to approximately the original height.

== Building ==
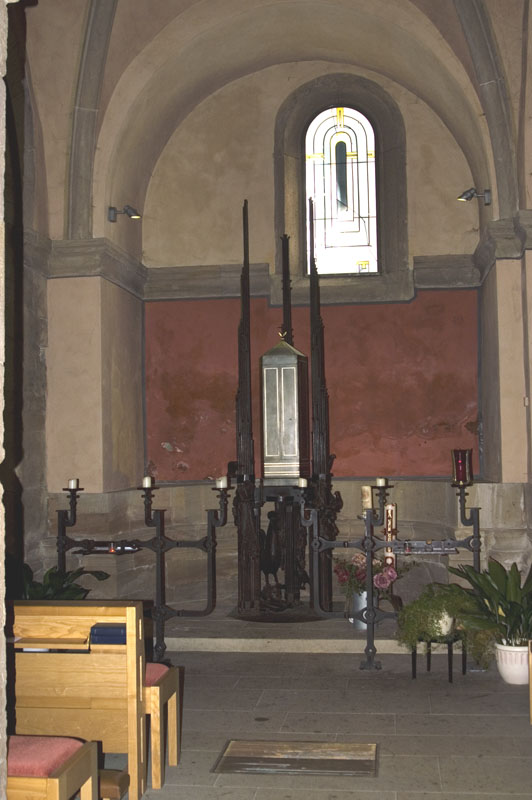
Sacrament chapel with window by Johannes Schreiter

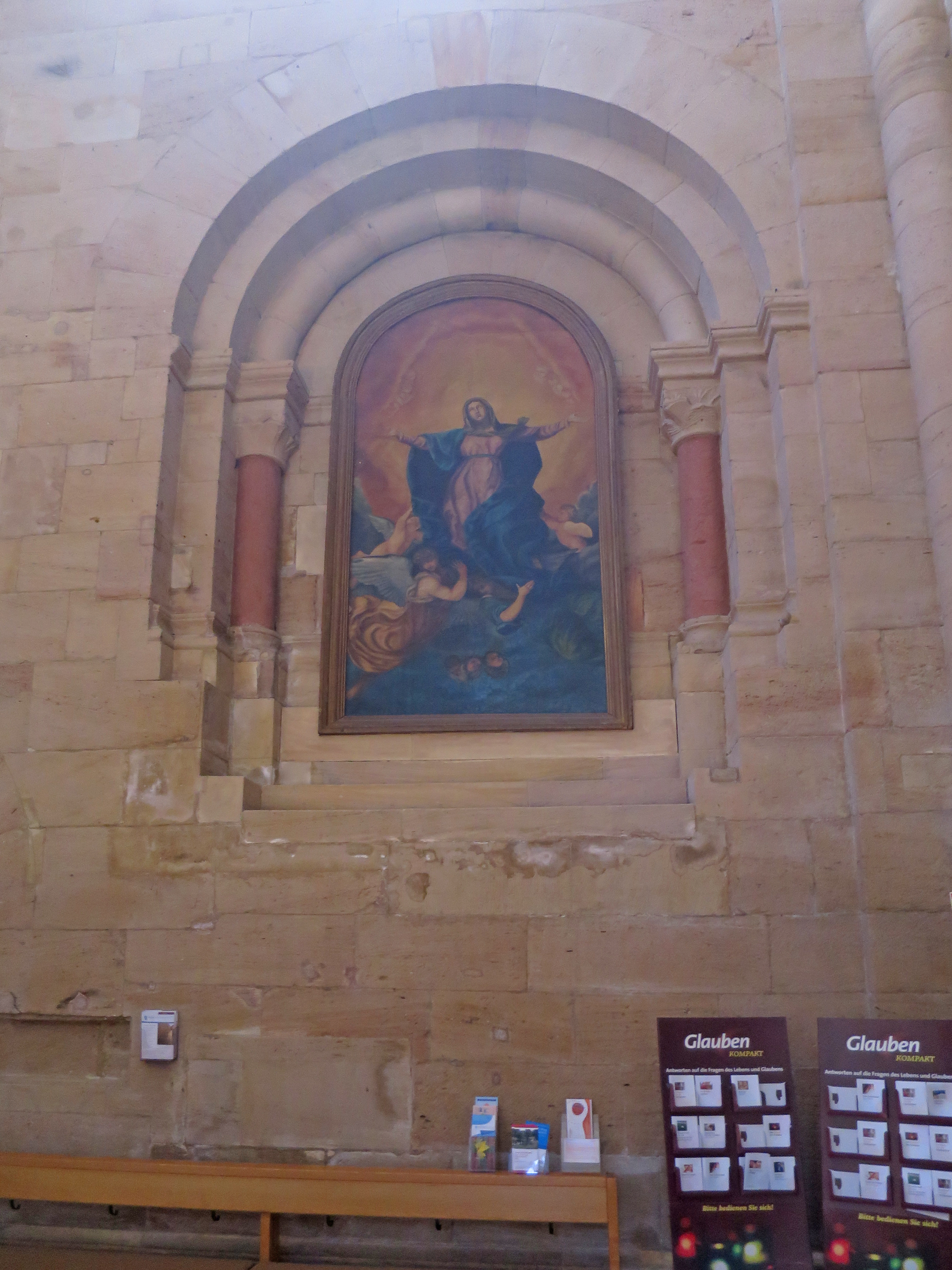
Passage to the dormitory in the south wall of the transept

The Otterberg Abbey Church is not only the second largest church, but also the largest and best-preserved monastery church in the Palatinate. It is an outstanding example of Cistercian order architecture.

The building is oriented west-east, 79.5 m long, 24.6 m wide, 20 m high and cruciform in floor plan. It is made of yellowish sandstone. On some of the stone blocks, the mason's marks can still be seen. After the last renovation, the building remained with exposed stone.

Notable is a strong adherence to the style of the first construction phase over about half a century.

=== Foundation ===
The foundation of the building proved to be very difficult and elaborate. Located between the steep valley slope and the Otterbach, a large amount of slope water and the high groundwater pressed against the building. To secure the structure against this, an entire system of channels had to be created to drain the water. This form of foundation is unique for a medieval building. As late as the beginning of the 19th century, it was reported that in winter the water in the church – probably after neglected maintenance of the drainage – stood "several feet" high.

From north to south, crossing the nave in the foundation area, a wooden water pipe ran, in which drinking water for the monastery flowed. In its oldest preserved sections, it is dated to 1168 by dendrochronology and was uncovered during an archaeological excavation in 1968. The drinking water came from one of the numerous springs at the foot of the Schlossberg. From there, the water pipe led under the monastery church into the cloister. The exact original end of the pipe is not known.

=== Nave ===
In the nave, it is noticeable that the central and northern aisles are 88 cm higher than the first-built southern aisle. The latter is also 90 cm wider than its northern counterpart. This change during construction was probably due to the problems caused by the high groundwater. The planned vestibule, for which the connections on the west facade can be seen, was never executed.

=== Transept and chapels ===
In the south wall of the south transept arm, at about 2 m height, the – now walled up – passage to the – not preserved – dormitory can be seen. Here the central image of the former Roman Catholic high altar from the 19th century was inserted. The wall surfaces in which the accesses to the not preserved chapels were formerly located are also walled up today. These originally nine chapels, which were located to the east of the transept arms and the choir, are not preserved. At the end of the 19th century, a neo-Romanesque annex with a shed roof was placed over the area of the two inner chapels of the south transept, which originally served as a sacristy for the Roman Catholic community. Today, one of the two side chapels contains the tabernacle, the second side chapel serves as a baptistery. The stained glass windows are by Johannes Schreiter.

=== Vaults ===
The church was vaulted in the double-bay system. It adopted the vault distribution of the Early Gothic nave of the Pontigny Abbey Church built from 1138; the arcades and vaults of the side aisles are already pointed-arched. But in contrast to Pontigny, all portals have Romanesque forms and likewise almost all windows. Thus, the church can be assigned to the style of Upper Rhenish late Romanesque. Only in the west gable are Gothic window forms adopted, and toward the west the pillars become somewhat more slender. The use of large blocks makes the masonry appear particularly massive. On the buttresses, a development from clumsy proportions to more differentiated, delicate elements can be seen. The asceticism characteristic of the Cistercian style was always observed during the long construction period.

=== Furnishings and burials ===
The current furnishings date mainly from the 20th century. The gravestones from the 13th to 16th centuries set up in the south aisle were brought here secondarily and come mainly from the – not preserved – cloister. A significant portion come from members of the family of the Raugraves, a high noble family that owned property in the area. In addition, Bishop Eberhard I of Worms, who also came from this family, was buried in the church.

=== Details ===
The blocks from which the church is built show a large number of different mason's marks.

The sundial on the south wall belongs to the original inventory and is one of the oldest preserved in Germany.

== Organ ==
Until 1979, there were two organs in the abbey church: a "Catholic" instrument in the north transept on a gallery from 1931, and the "Protestant" instrument, also on a gallery directly at the partition wall.

Today there is an "ecumenical" organ, financed by both confessions. It is located in a bay of the main nave before the crossing and fits into the arcade arch. The instrument was built in 1999 by the Swiss organ building company Goll (Lucerne) with 26 stops (1,648 pipes) on three manuals and pedal. The instrument has mechanical playing and stop actions.

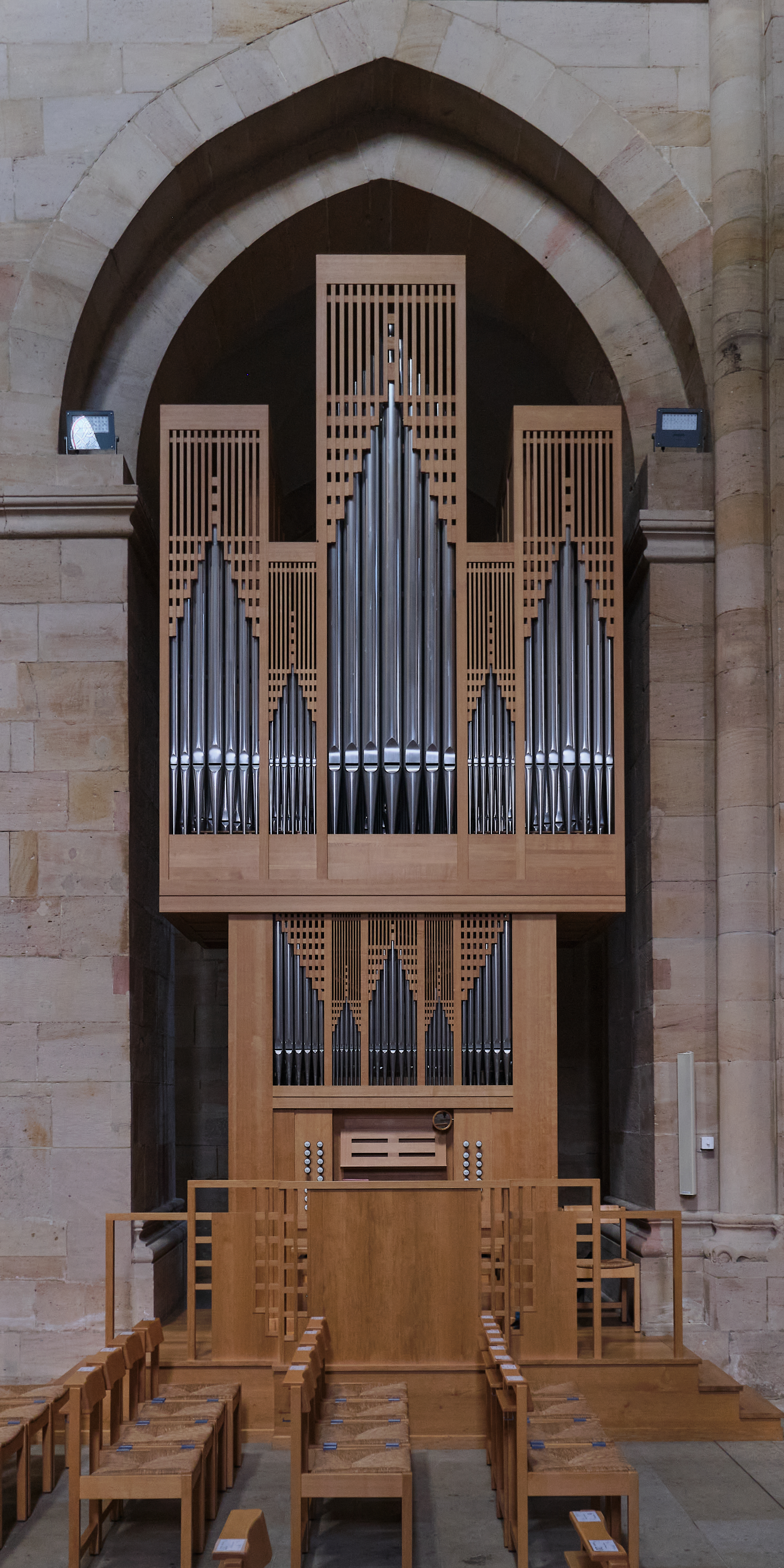
Goll organ in an arch niche

I Hauptwerk C–g^{3}
1.	Principal	8′
2.	Hohlflöte	8′
3.	Gamba	8′
4.	Octave	4′
5.	Spitzflöte	4′
6.	Quinte	2 2/3′
7.	Octave	2′
8.	Mixtur IV	1 1/3′
9.	Trompete	8′

II Brustwerk C–g^{3}
10.	Salicional	8′
11.	Gedackt	8′
12.	Principal	4′
13.	Rohrflöte	4′
14.	Nasat	2 2/3′
15.	Terz	1 3/5′
16.	Flageolet	2′
17.	Scharf IV	1′
18.	Musette	8′
	Tremulant

III Cornettwerk g^{0}–g^{3}
19.	Flöte	8′
20.	Cornett IV	4′

Pedal C–f^{1}
21.	Subbass	16′
22.	Octave (C-H from No. 1)	8′
23.	Cello (C-H from No. 3)	8′
24.	Octave	4′
25.	Posaune	16′
26.	Trompete (No. 25)	8′

- Couplers: II/I, III/I, I/P, II/P

== Bells ==
In the simultaneously used church, each of the two church communities also has its own peal. The three steel bells of the Catholics have been hanging since 1971 in a newly built roof turret over the crossing, previously in the roof truss. The bells of the Protestant community hang in the roof truss over the rose window of the west facade. This peal also consists of three steel bells and one small bronze Lord's Prayer bell, which is only rung individually. The steel bells of both peals were cast by the Bochumer Verein, the Catholic ones in 1924, the Protestant ones in 1950. The bronze bell was cast by Pfeiffer/Kaiserslautern in 1926. The two peals are tuned to each other, ring together rather rarely, but in any case every Saturday evening to ring in Sunday.

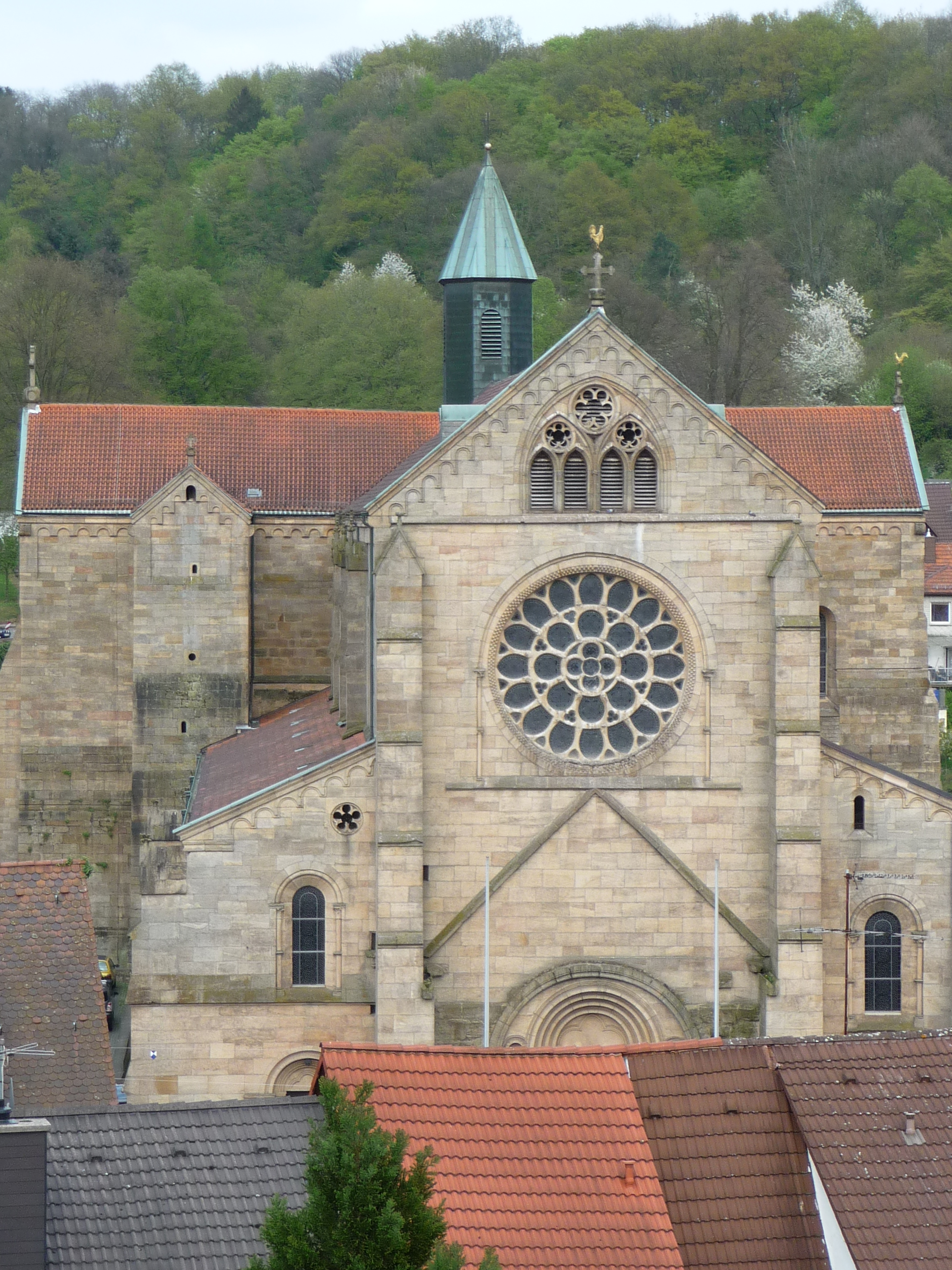
Roof turret for the 'Catholic' bells (rear) and sound openings over the rose for the 'Protestant' peal

Bell	Name	Strike tone	Weight	Diameter
Catholic peal
1	Sacred Heart Bell	e′	974 kg	1380 mm
2	Mary Bell	g′	728 kg	1170 mm
3	Joseph Bell	a′	480 kg	1016 mm
Protestant peal
1	Wilhelmina Bell	h°	2950 kg	1740 mm
2	Peace Bell	d′	1710 kg	1485 mm
3	Baptism Bell	e′	1250 kg	1325 mm
4	Lord's Prayer Bell	h′	325 kg	830 mm

== Literature ==
- Frey, Michael (1845). Urkundenbuch des Klosters Otterberg in der Rheinpfalz [Document Book of Otterberg Monastery in the Rhineland Palatinate] (in German). Kirchheim.
- Kaiser, Jürgen; Werling, Michael (1998). Die Otterberger Bauplastik, zur 900. Wiederkehr der Gründung des Zisterzienserordens 1098–1998 [The Otterberg Building Sculpture, on the 900th Anniversary of the Founding of the Cistercian Order 1098–1998] (in German). Arbogast. ISBN 3-87022-251-4.
- Keddigkeit, Jürgen; Werling, Michael; Schulz, Rüdiger; Lagemann, Charlotte (2015). Keddigkeit, Jürgen; Untermann, Matthias; Klapp, Sabine; Lagemann, Charlotte; Ammerich, Hans (eds.). Otterberg, St. Maria. Zisterzienserabtei Otterburg [Otterberg, St. Mary. Cistercian Abbey Otterburg]. Pfälzisches Klosterlexikon. Handbuch der pfälzischen Klöster, Stifte und Kommenden (in German). Vol. 3: M–R. Kaiserslautern: Institut für pfälzische Geschichte und Volkskunde. pp. 524–587. ISBN 978-3-927754-78-2.
- Petry, Ludwig, ed. (1988). Handbuch der historischen Stätten Deutschlands 5: Rheinland-Pfalz und Saarland = Kröners Taschenausgabe. Band 275 [Handbook of Historic Sites in Germany 5: Rhineland-Palatinate and Saarland = Kröner's Pocket Edition. Volume 275] (in German) (3rd revised ed.). Stuttgart: Kröner. ISBN 3-520-27503-1.
- Sebald, Eduard (2020). Die ehemalige Zisterzienserabteikirche in Otterberg [The Former Cistercian Abbey Church in Otterberg] (in German). Speyer: Verlagshaus Speyer. ISBN 978-3-947534-11-1.
- Werling, Michael (1986). Die Baugeschichte der ehemaligen Abteikirche Otterberg unter besonderer Berücksichtigung ihrer Steinmetzzeichen [The Construction History of the Former Otterberg Abbey Church with Special Consideration of Its Mason's Marks]. Beiträge zur pfälzischen Volkskunde 3 (in German). Kaiserslautern: Heimatstelle Pfalz.
- Werling, Michael (2000). Otterberg und die Kunst der Wölbung [Otterberg and the Art of Vaulting] (PDF). Veröffentlichung der Fachhochschule Köln, Fachbereich Architektur, Fachgebiet Baugeschichte, Stadtbaugeschichte und Entwerfen = Berichte zum Forschungsfreisemester 1 (in German). with contributions by Jürgen Kaiser and Rainer Hempel.
- Werling, Michael (1993). Der Otterberger Kapitelsaal, zur 850. Wiederkehr der Gründung des Zisterzienserklosters Otterberg 1143–1993 [The Otterberg Chapter House, on the 850th Anniversary of the Founding of the Cistercian Monastery Otterberg 1143–1993] (in German). Arbogast. ISBN 3-87022-123-2.
- Werling, Michael (1990). Die Zisterzienserabtei Otterberg [The Cistercian Abbey Otterberg] (PDF) (in German). Otterbach: Franz Arbogast. ISBN 3-87022-123-2.
