= Hermann Bitz =

German footballer

Personal information
- Date of birth: 21 September 1950 (age 76)
- Place of birth: Olsbrücken, West Germany
- Height: 1.70 m (5 ft 7 in)
- Position: Midfielder

Senior career*
| Years | Team | Apps | (Gls) |
| 1970–1975 | 1. FC Kaiserslautern | 132 | (15) |
| 1975–1979 | Kickers Offenbach | 140 | (41) |
| 1979–1981 | TSV 1860 München | 42 | (5) |
| Total | | 314 | (61) |

International career
- West Germany U-23
- West Germany Amateur
- * Club domestic league appearances and goals

Hermann Bitz (born 21 September 1950 in Olsbrücken) is a retired German football player. He spent eight seasons in the Bundesliga with 1. FC Kaiserslautern, Kickers Offenbach and TSV 1860 München. He also participated in the 1972 Olympics for West Germany.

== Honours ==
- DFB-Pokal finalist: 1971–72
