= Schneckenhausen =

- Municipality
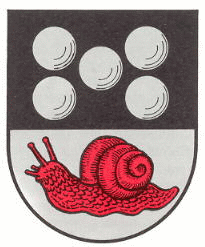
- Coat of arms

- Location of Schneckenhausen within Kaiserslautern district
- Interactive map of Schneckenhausen
- Location within Germany Location within Rhineland-Palatinate
- Coordinates: 49°32′25″N 07°44′43″E
- Country: Germany
- State: Rhineland-Palatinate
- District: Kaiserslautern
- Municipal assoc.: Otterbach-Otterberg

Government
  - Mayor (2019–24): Hanna-Lore Scharding

Area
  - Total: 3.72 km^{2} (1.44 sq mi)
- Elevation: 330 m (1,080 ft)

Population (2025-12-31)
  - Total: 565
  - Density: 152/km^{2} (393/sq mi)
- Time zone: UTC+01:00 (CET)
  - Summer (DST): UTC+02:00 (CEST)
- Postal codes: 67699
- Dialling codes: 06301
- Vehicle registration: KL

Schneckenhausen (German pronunciation: [ʃnɛkn̩ˈhaʊzn̩]) is a municipality in the district of Kaiserslautern, in Rhineland-Palatinate, western Germany.

== Geography ==
Schneckenhausen lies 11 km (7 mi) north of Kaiserslautern at the spring of the Odenbach, which flows for around 22 km (14 mi) before joining the Glan River. The community belongs to the Verbandsgemeinde (regional administrative body) Otterbach-Otterberg, which has its administrative offices in Otterberg. Along its outer borders lie the Wickelhof and Creutzhof farmsteads.

== Politics ==
The municipal council is composed of 8 members who are elected locally through a plurality voting system.

== Economy and infrastructure ==
The public transportation is integrated into the Rhein-Neckar Transit Network. Two lines of the regional bus system connect the municipality to Kaiserslautern. The nearest train station is located in Katzweiler roughly 7 km (4 mi) southwest. The nearest Bundesstraße (Federal Highway) is B270, which runs parallel to the train tracks.
