= Oberarnbach =

- Municipality
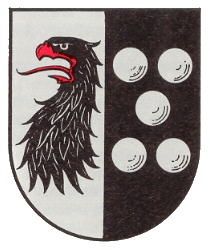
- Coat of arms

- Location of Oberarnbach within Kaiserslautern district
- Interactive map of Oberarnbach
- Location within Germany Location within Rhineland-Palatinate
- Coordinates: 49°23′11″N 7°35′22″E
- Country: Germany
- State: Rhineland-Palatinate
- District: Kaiserslautern

Government
  - Mayor (2019–24): Reiner Klein (CDU)

Area
  - Total: 5.08 km^{2} (1.96 sq mi)
- Elevation: 331 m (1,086 ft)

Population (2025-12-31)
  - Total: 452
  - Density: 89.0/km^{2} (230/sq mi)
- Time zone: UTC+01:00 (CET)
  - Summer (DST): UTC+02:00 (CEST)
- Postal codes: 66851
- Dialling codes: 06371
- Vehicle registration: KL
- Website: www.oberarnbach.de

Oberarnbach is a municipality in the district of Kaiserslautern, in Rhineland-Palatinate, western Germany.
