= Otterbach =

- Municipality
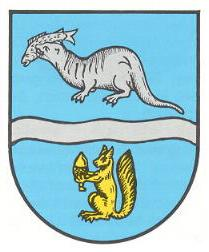
- Coat of arms

- Location of Otterbach within Kaiserslautern district
- Interactive map of Otterbach
- Location within Germany Location within Rhineland-Palatinate
- Coordinates: 49°29′13″N 7°44′03″E
- Country: Germany
- State: Rhineland-Palatinate
- District: Kaiserslautern
- Municipal assoc.: Otterbach-Otterberg

Government
  - Mayor (2019–24): Stefan Kölbel (SPD)

Area
  - Total: 6.2 km^{2} (2.4 sq mi)
- Elevation: 215 m (705 ft)

Population (2025-12-31)
  - Total: 3,939
  - Density: 640/km^{2} (1,600/sq mi)
- Time zone: UTC+01:00 (CET)
  - Summer (DST): UTC+02:00 (CEST)
- Postal codes: 67731
- Dialling codes: 06301
- Vehicle registration: KL
- Website: www.otterbach-otterberg.de

Otterbach (German pronunciation: [ˈɔtɐbax]) is a municipality in the district of Kaiserslautern, in Rhineland-Palatinate, Germany.

Otterbach was the seat of the former Verbandsgemeinde ("collective municipality") Otterbach, which merged into the new Verbandsgemeinde Otterbach-Otterberg in 2014.

== Geography ==
=== State ===
Otterbach lies in the northwest of Kaiserslautern in the so-called Kaiserslautern Senke. To the north is the Nordpfälzer Bergland and to the east the Otterberger Wald, which belongs to the Palatinate Forest. The community consists of the two districts Otterbach and Sambach. The residential areas Falltal and Sambacher Ziegelhütte also belong to the Otterbach district.

Neighbouring municipalities are the local municipality of Katzweiler in the northwest, the town of Otterberg in the northeast and the independent town of Kaiserslautern with the districts of Erlenbach, Morlautern, Wiesenthalerhof and Erfenbach in the south.

=== Surveys and waters ===
The Schlossberg rises in the south and the Galgenberg in the north.

The core town lies at the mouth of the Otterbach stream into the Lauter. The Ziegelbach flows into the Lauter from the right between the core village and the Sambach district. The latter also forms the western boundary with Kaiserslautern.

== History ==
South of the village on the Schlossberg was the disappeared Sterrenberg Castle. Until the end of the 18th century, the community belonged to the Otterbach estate, which belonged to the von der Leyen family. From 28 to 30 November 1793, the municipal area was partly the scene of the Battle of Kaiserslautern.

From 1798 to 1814, when the Palatinate was part of the French Republic (until 1804) and then part of the Napoleonic Empire, Otterbach was incorporated into the canton of Otterberg. In 1815 the village initially belonged to Austria. One year later he moved to the Kingdom of Bavaria. From 1818 to 1862 he belonged to the Landkommissariat Kaiserslautern, from which the Bezirksamt Kaiserslautern emerged.

From 1939 the town was part of the district of Kaiserslautern. After the Second World War, Otterbach became part of the newly formed state of Rhineland-Palatinate within the French occupation zone. In the course of the first administrative reform in Rhineland-Palatinate, the previously independent municipality of Sambach was incorporated into Otterbach on 7 June 1969. Two years later, the municipality became the seat of the newly formed association municipality of the same name, to which six further local municipalities belonged. Since 1 July 2014, Otterbach has been part of the Otterbach-Otterberg association of municipalities.

== Politics ==
=== Emblem ===
Blasonation: "A blue shield divided by a silver wave bar. Above a silver otter with an equally coloured fish in its mouth. Below, a golden squirrel holding a golden acorn in its front paws." Reason for the coat of arms: The coat of arms is a combination of the two old coats of arms of the municipalities of Sambach and Otterbach. The Otter is the name giver of the place Otterbach, more exactly for the brook "Otterbach". The squirrel is the heraldic animal of the abbey in neighbouring Otterberg, which had a mill in Sambach. The silver waveband stands for the Otterbach. The colours blue and silver are reminiscent of the former reign of the Counts of Leyen.
