= Otterbach (Inde) =

River in Germany

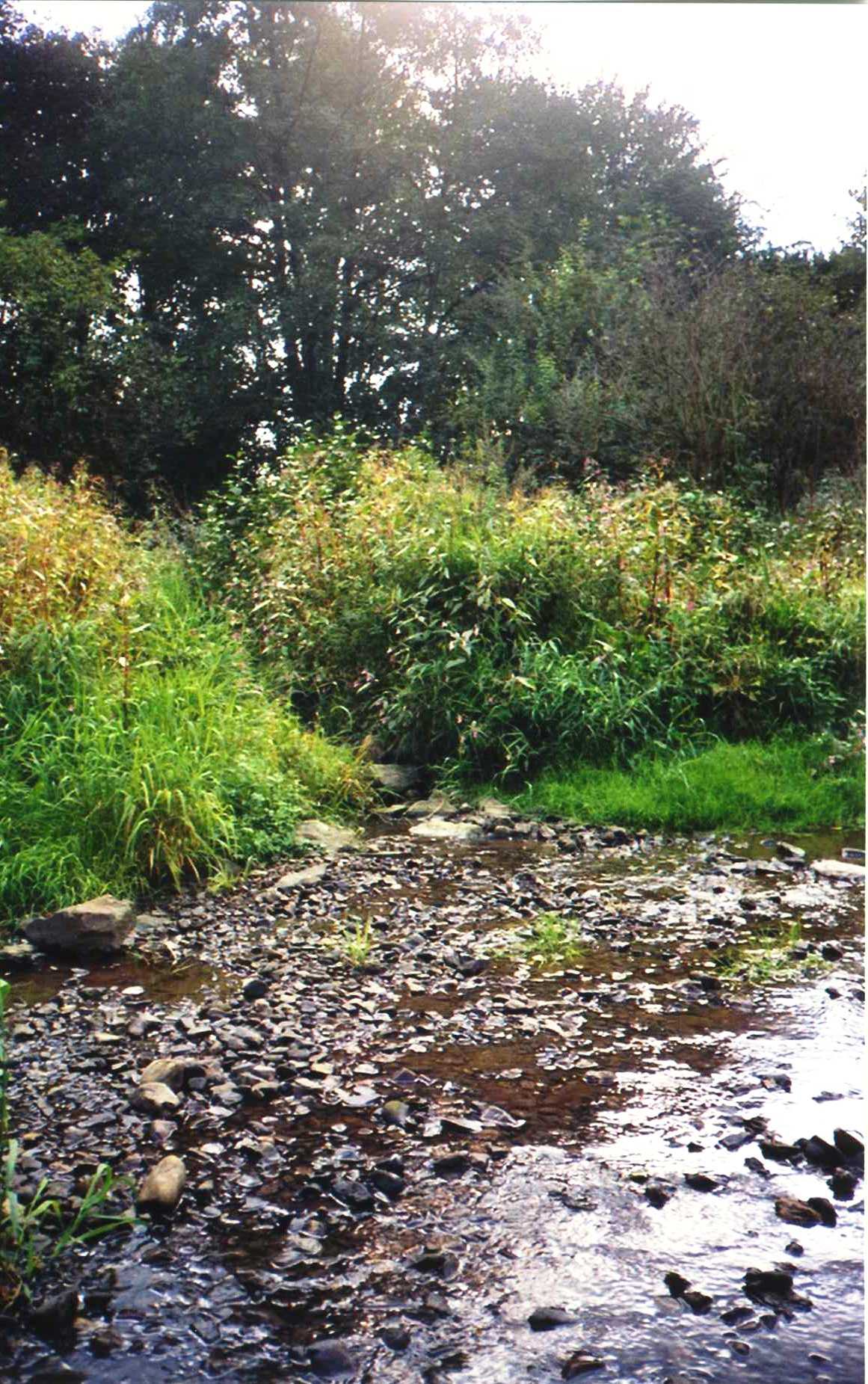

Location
- Country: Germany
- States: North Rhine-Westphalia

Physical characteristics
- Mouth
  - location: Inde
  - coordinates: 50.8209°N 6.3127°E

Basin features
- Progression: Inde→ Rur→ Meuse→ North Sea

Otterbach (German pronunciation: [ˈɔtɐbax]) is a small river of North Rhine-Westphalia, Germany. It is 4.2 km (2.6 mi) long and is a right tributary of the Inde near Eschweiler.

== See also ==
- List of rivers of North Rhine-Westphalia
