= Otterbach-Otterberg =

District

- Verbandsgemeinde
- Location of Otterbach-Otterberg within Kaiserslautern district
- Interactive map of Otterbach-Otterberg
- Location within Germany Location within Rhineland-Palatinate
- Coordinates: 49°30′N 7°46′E
- Country: Germany
- State: Rhineland-Palatinate
- District: Kaiserslautern
- Seat: Otterberg
- Subdivisions: 12 municipalities

Area
  - Total: 123.02 km^{2} (47.50 sq mi)

Population (2025-12-31)
  - Total: 18,661
  - Density: 151.69/km^{2} (392.88/sq mi)
- Time zone: UTC+01:00 (CET)
  - Summer (DST): UTC+02:00 (CEST)
- Website: www.otterbach-otterberg.de

Otterbach-Otterberg is a Verbandsgemeinde ("collective municipality") in the district Kaiserslautern, in Rhineland-Palatinate, Germany. The seat of the Verbandsgemeinde is in Otterberg. It was formed on 1 July 2014 by the merger of the former Verbandsgemeinden Otterbach and Otterberg.

The Verbandsgemeinde Otterbach-Otterberg consists of the following Ortsgemeinden ("local municipalities"):

1. Frankelbach
2. Heiligenmoschel
3. Hirschhorn
4. Katzweiler
5. Mehlbach
6. Niederkirchen
7. Olsbrücken
8. Otterbach
9. Otterberg
10. Schallodenbach
11. Schneckenhausen
12. Sulzbachtal
