= Otterbach (Pulsnitz) =

River in Germany

Location
- Country: Germany
- States: Saxony

Physical characteristics
- Mouth
  - location: Pulsnitz
  - coordinates: 51.3613°N 13.8497°E

Basin features
- Progression: Pulsnitz→ Black Elster→ Elbe→ North Sea

The Otterbach (German pronunciation: [ˈɔtɐbax]) is a stream near Königsbruck in Saxony, Germany. It is a right tributary of the Pulsnitz, which it joins near Thiendorf. The Otterbach and Pulsnitz area an important eco-system for animals at threat of extinction such as the otter and various bird species.

== See also ==
- List of rivers of Saxony
