= Mehlbach =

- Municipality
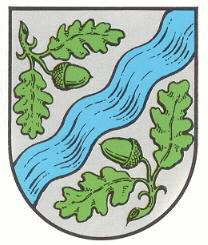
- Coat of arms

- Location of Mehlbach within Kaiserslautern district
- Interactive map of Mehlbach
- Location within Germany Location within Rhineland-Palatinate
- Coordinates: 49°31′22″N 7°43′05″E
- Country: Germany
- State: Rhineland-Palatinate
- District: Kaiserslautern
- Municipal assoc.: Otterbach-Otterberg

Government
  - Mayor (2019–24): Gabi Fliege (CDU)

Area
  - Total: 9.03 km^{2} (3.49 sq mi)
- Elevation: 264 m (866 ft)

Population (2025-12-31)
  - Total: 1,109
  - Density: 123/km^{2} (318/sq mi)
- Time zone: UTC+01:00 (CET)
  - Summer (DST): UTC+02:00 (CEST)
- Postal codes: 67735
- Dialling codes: 06301
- Vehicle registration: KL

Mehlbach (German pronunciation: [ˈmeːlbax]) is a municipality in the district of Kaiserslautern, in Rhineland-Palatinate, western Germany.
