= Frankelbach =

- Municipality
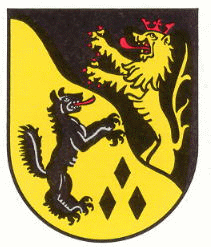
- Coat of arms

- Location of Frankelbach within Kaiserslautern district
- Interactive map of Frankelbach
- Location within Germany Location within Rhineland-Palatinate
- Coordinates: 49°32′04″N 7°38′11″E
- Country: Germany
- State: Rhineland-Palatinate
- District: Kaiserslautern
- Municipal assoc.: Otterbach-Otterberg

Government
  - Mayor (2019–24): Hans-Peter Spohn

Area
  - Total: 5.29 km^{2} (2.04 sq mi)
- Elevation: 230 m (750 ft)

Population (2025-12-31)
  - Total: 318
  - Density: 60.1/km^{2} (156/sq mi)
- Time zone: UTC+01:00 (CET)
  - Summer (DST): UTC+02:00 (CEST)
- Postal codes: 67737
- Dialling codes: 06308
- Vehicle registration: KL

Frankelbach (German pronunciation: [ˈfʁaŋkl̩bax]) is a municipality in the district of Kaiserslautern, in Rhineland-Palatinate, western Germany.
