= Heiligenmoschel =

- Municipality
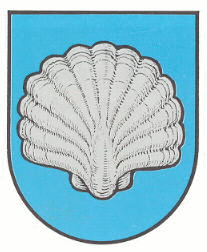
- Coat of arms

- Location of Heiligenmoschel within Kaiserslautern district
- Interactive map of Heiligenmoschel
- Location within Germany Location within Rhineland-Palatinate
- Coordinates: 49°33′30″N 7°45′36″E
- Country: Germany
- State: Rhineland-Palatinate
- District: Kaiserslautern
- Municipal assoc.: Otterbach-Otterberg
- Subdivisions: 4

Government
  - Mayor (2019–24): Willi Mühlberger

Area
  - Total: 8.68 km^{2} (3.35 sq mi)
- Elevation: 297 m (974 ft)

Population (2025-12-31)
  - Total: 618
  - Density: 71.2/km^{2} (184/sq mi)
- Time zone: UTC+01:00 (CET)
  - Summer (DST): UTC+02:00 (CEST)
- Postal codes: 67699
- Dialling codes: 06363
- Vehicle registration: KL

Heiligenmoschel is a municipality in the district of Kaiserslautern, in Rhineland-Palatinate, western Germany.
