= Hirschhorn, Rhineland-Palatinate =

Hirschhorn/Pfalz
- Municipality
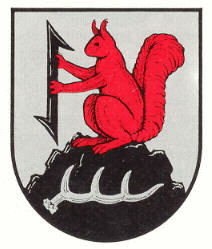
- Coat of arms

- Location of Hirschhorn/Pfalz within Kaiserslautern district
- Interactive map of Hirschhorn/Pfalz
- Location within Germany Location within Rhineland-Palatinate
- Coordinates: 49°31′11″N 7°40′51″E
- Country: Germany
- State: Rhineland-Palatinate
- District: Kaiserslautern
- Municipal assoc.: Otterbach-Otterberg

Government
  - Mayor (2020–24): Kathrin Groschup

Area
  - Total: 3.32 km^{2} (1.28 sq mi)
- Elevation: 213 m (699 ft)

Population (2025-12-31)
  - Total: 727
  - Density: 219/km^{2} (567/sq mi)
- Time zone: UTC+01:00 (CET)
  - Summer (DST): UTC+02:00 (CEST)
- Postal codes: 67732
- Dialling codes: 06308
- Vehicle registration: KL

Hirschhorn/Pfalz (German pronunciation: [ˈhɪʁʃhɔʁn]) is a municipality in the district of Kaiserslautern, in Rhineland-Palatinate, western Germany.
