= Sulzbachtal =

- Municipality
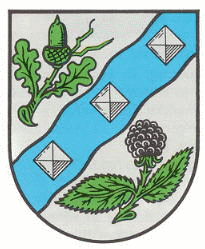
- Coat of arms

- Location of Sulzbachtal within Kaiserslautern district
- Interactive map of Sulzbachtal
- Location within Germany Location within Rhineland-Palatinate
- Coordinates: 49°31′23″N 7°39′51″E
- Country: Germany
- State: Rhineland-Palatinate
- District: Kaiserslautern
- Municipal assoc.: Otterbach-Otterberg
- Subdivisions: 2

Government
  - Mayor (2019–24): Ero Zinßmeister

Area
  - Total: 6.71 km^{2} (2.59 sq mi)
- Elevation: 220 m (720 ft)

Population (2025-12-31)
  - Total: 425
  - Density: 63.3/km^{2} (164/sq mi)
- Time zone: UTC+01:00 (CET)
  - Summer (DST): UTC+02:00 (CEST)
- Postal codes: 67734
- Dialling codes: 06308
- Vehicle registration: KL
- Website: www.sulzbachtal.de

Sulzbachtal is a municipality in the district of Kaiserslautern, in Rhineland-Palatinate, western Germany.
