= Katzweiler =

- Municipality
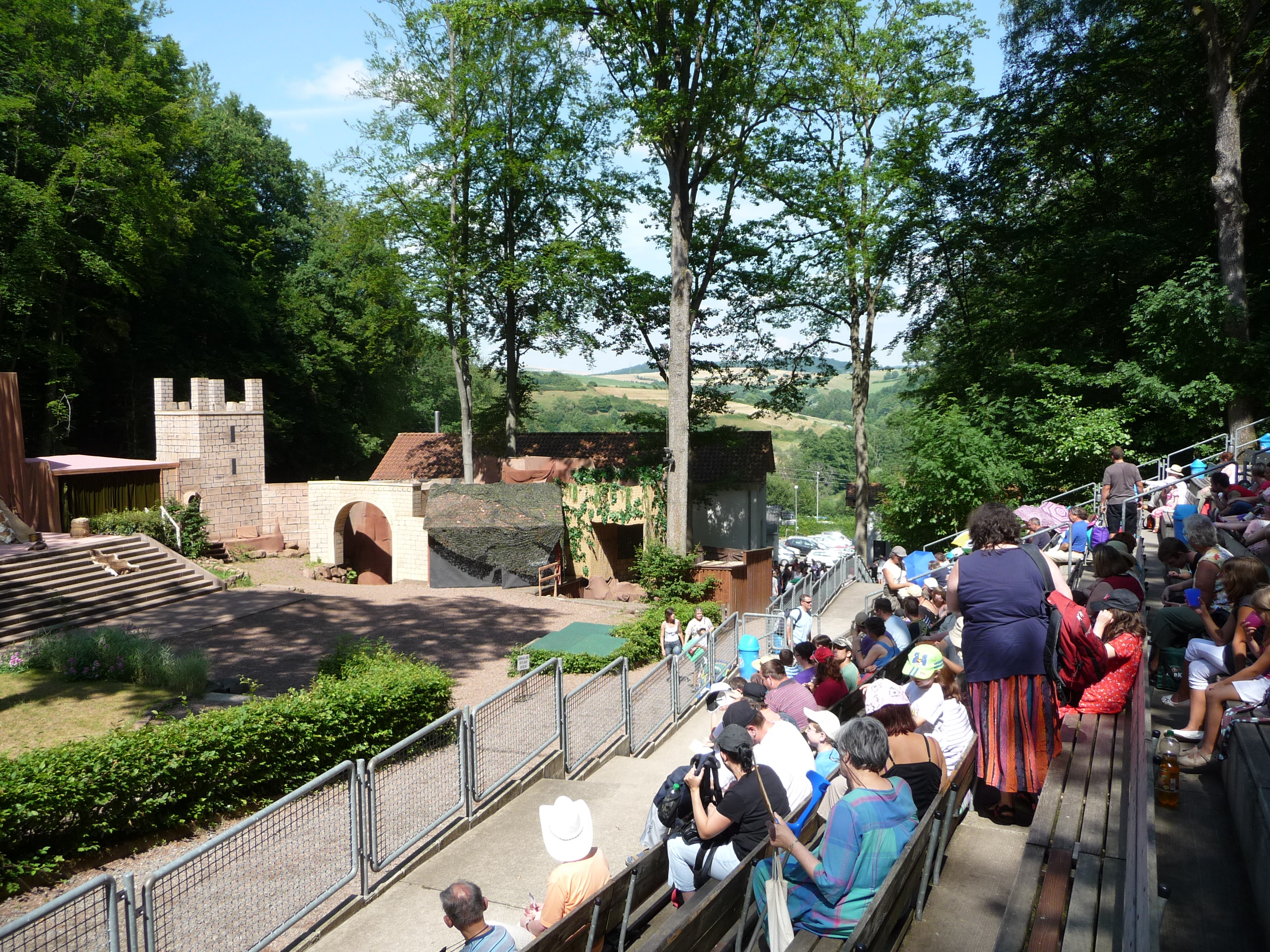

- Coat of arms

- Location of Katzweiler within Kaiserslautern district
- Interactive map of Katzweiler
- Location within Germany Location within Rhineland-Palatinate
- Coordinates: 49°30′10″N 7°41′53″E
- Country: Germany
- State: Rhineland-Palatinate
- District: Kaiserslautern
- Municipal assoc.: Otterbach-Otterberg

Government
  - Mayor (2019–24): Sven Rheinheimer (FW)

Area
  - Total: 9.42 km^{2} (3.64 sq mi)
- Elevation: 226 m (741 ft)

Population (2025-12-31)
  - Total: 1,886
  - Density: 200/km^{2} (519/sq mi)
- Time zone: UTC+01:00 (CET)
  - Summer (DST): UTC+02:00 (CEST)
- Postal codes: 67734
- Dialling codes: 06301
- Vehicle registration: KL

Katzweiler (German pronunciation: [ˈkatsvaɪlɐ]) is a municipality in the district of Kaiserslautern, in Rhineland-Palatinate, western Germany.

== History ==
The municipality was first mentioned in 1190 as Cazwilere. Until the end of the 18th Century, it was part of the Electoral Palatinate and under the jurisdiction of the Lautern Superior Court.

From 1798 to 1814, when the Palatinate region was part of the French First Republic (until 1804) und thereafter of the First French Empire, the municipality was incorporated into the Kanton Otterberg. In 1815 the village belonged to Austria, but changed to the Kingdom of Bavaria already in 1816.

In 1939, it became part of the Kaiserslautern district. Following World War II, it was within the French Zone of Occupation that formed the new state of Rhineland-Palatinate in 1946.

In the course of the first administrative reforms in Rheinland-Pfalz, the municipality became part of the newly formed Verbandsgemeinde Otterbach in 1971. Since July 1, 2014, it is part of the Verbandsgemeinde Otterbach-Otterberg .

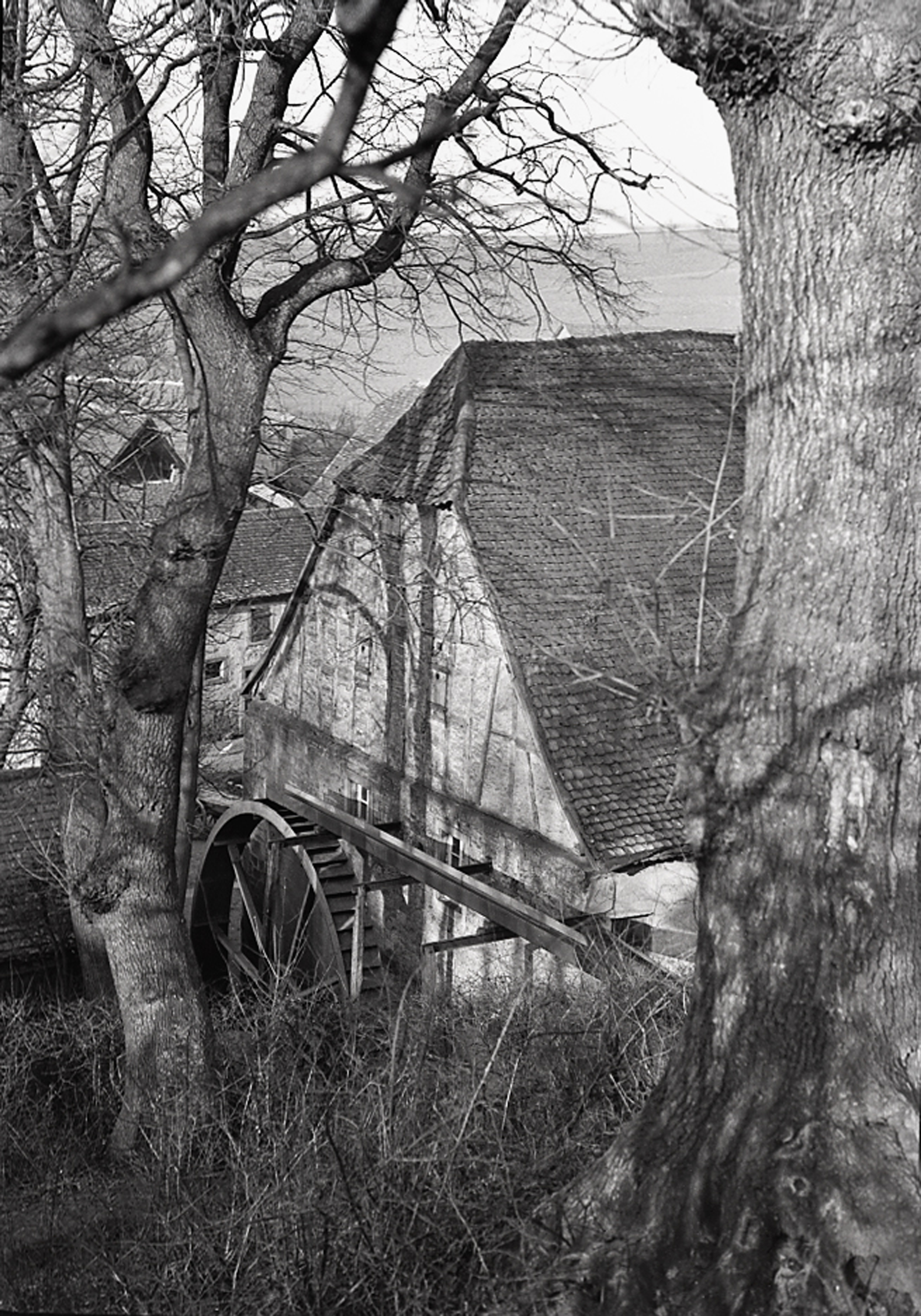
Katzweiler's Mill, photo from 1936
