= Kaiserslautern (district) =

Coordinates: 49°30′N 7°40′E

- District
- Flag Coat of arms
- Country: Germany
- State: Rhineland-Palatinate
- Capital: Kaiserslautern

Government
  - District admin.: Ralf Leßmeister (CDU)

Area
  - Total: 639.85 km^{2} (247.05 sq mi)

Population (31 December 2022)
  - Total: 108,216
  - Density: 170/km^{2} (440/sq mi)
- Time zone: UTC+01:00 (CET)
  - Summer (DST): UTC+02:00 (CEST)
- Vehicle registration: KL
- Website: kaiserslautern-kreis.de

Kaiserslautern is a district (Kreis) in the south of Rhineland-Palatinate, Germany. Neighboring districts are (from west clockwise) Kusel, Saarpfalz-Kreis, Donnersbergkreis, Bad Dürkheim and Südwestpfalz. The city of Kaiserslautern is almost fully enclosed by, but not belonging to the district.

== History ==
The district of Kaiserslautern was established in 1939. Minor changes of the borders occurred in 1969 and 1972.

== Geography ==
The district includes parts of the Palatinate Forest (Pfälzer Wald) in the east and the North Palatine Hills (Nordpfälzer Bergland) in the west, as well as the lowlands between them.

== Partnerships ==
Since 1962 the district has had a partnership with Lancaster County, Pennsylvania. As part of the partnership of Rhineland-Palatinate with Rwanda, the district has had a partnership with the municipality of Musasa since 1983. In 2002, a partnership with the Polish district of Olesno was started.

== Coat of arms ==
The eagle on the top of the coat of arms represents the several imperial estates in the district. The lion on the left is the lion of the Electorate of the Palatinate, the fish in the middle is taken from the coat of arms of the city of Kaiserslautern. The bezants (coins) on the right represent the Lords of Sickingen and their estate.

== Towns and municipalities ==
Clickable map of towns and municipalities in the district

Verbandsgemeinden
1. Bruchmühlbach-Miesau; 1. Bruchmühlbach-Miesau^{1}; 2. Gerhardsbrunn; 3. Lambsborn; 4. Langwieden; 5. Martinshöhe; 2. Enkenbach-Alsenborn; 1. Enkenbach-Alsenborn^{1}; 2. Fischbach; 3. Frankenstein; 4. Hochspeyer; 5. Mehlingen; 6. Neuhemsbach; 7. Sembach; 8. Waldleiningen	3. Landstuhl; 1. Bann; 2. Hauptstuhl; 3. Kindsbach; 4. Krickenbach; 5. Landstuhl^{1, 2}; 6. Linden; 7. Mittelbrunn; 8. Oberarnbach; 9. Queidersbach; 10. Schopp; 11. Stelzenberg; 12. Trippstadt	4. Otterbach-Otterberg; 1. Frankelbach; 2. Heiligenmoschel; 3. Hirschhorn; 4. Katzweiler; 5. Mehlbach; 6. Niederkirchen; 7. Olsbrücken; 8. Otterbach; 9. Otterberg^{1, 2}; 10. Schallodenbach; 11. Schneckenhausen; 12. Sulzbachtal	5. Ramstein-Miesenbach; 1. Hütschenhausen; 2. Kottweiler-Schwanden; 3. Niedermohr; 4. Ramstein-Miesenbach^{1, 2}; 5. Steinwenden; 6. Weilerbach; 1. Erzenhausen; 2. Eulenbis; 3. Kollweiler; 4. Mackenbach; 5. Reichenbach-Steegen; 6. Rodenbach; 7. Schwedelbach; 8. Weilerbach^{1}
^{1}seat of the Verbandsgemeinde; ^{2}town
