= Schallodenbach =

- Municipality
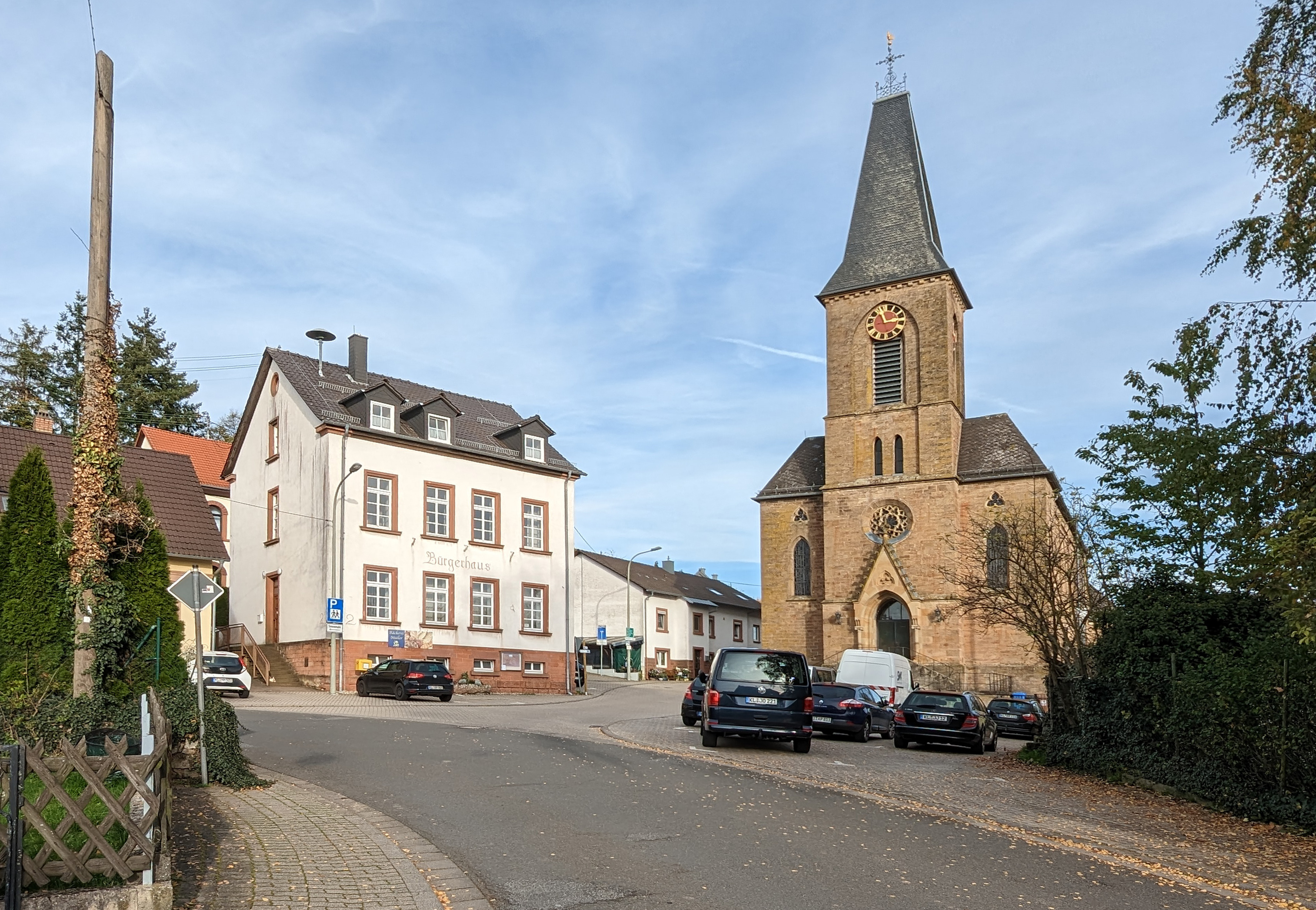

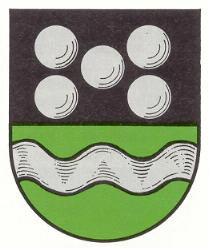
- Coat of arms

- Location of Schallodenbach within Kaiserslautern district
- Interactive map of Schallodenbach
- Location within Germany Location within Rhineland-Palatinate
- Coordinates: 49°32′46″N 7°43′03″E
- Country: Germany
- State: Rhineland-Palatinate
- District: Kaiserslautern
- Municipal assoc.: Otterbach-Otterberg

Government
  - Mayor (2019–24): Claudia Janovsky

Area
  - Total: 7.46 km^{2} (2.88 sq mi)
- Elevation: 309 m (1,014 ft)

Population (2025-12-31)
  - Total: 844
  - Density: 113/km^{2} (293/sq mi)
- Time zone: UTC+01:00 (CET)
  - Summer (DST): UTC+02:00 (CEST)
- Postal codes: 67701
- Dialling codes: 06363
- Vehicle registration: KL

Schallodenbach is municipality in the district Kaiserslautern of Rhineland-Palatinate, Germany.

== Location ==
Schallodenbach is situated approximately 13 km north of Kaiserslautern. Schallodenbach is part of the Verbandsgemeinde Otterbach-Otterberg.

== Politics and local events ==
The local council is made up of 13 councilmen and women (including the mayor). An annual village celebration event is held at the end of each September in Schallodenbach.

== History ==
The village is named for the von Schallodenbach. The village is first mentioned in writing in a document dated to 1202, indicating that the village was built shortly before, in the early 13th century, or the latest period of the 12th century. The original controller was Johann of Odenbach, and the village was initially known by his name.

There was a low castle in Schallodenbach, but it is now destroyed and unoccupied. The grave stones of Johann Gottfried of Sickingen and his wife Anna Magdalena of Obentraut lie in the local chapel.

== Photo gallery ==
Schallodenbach

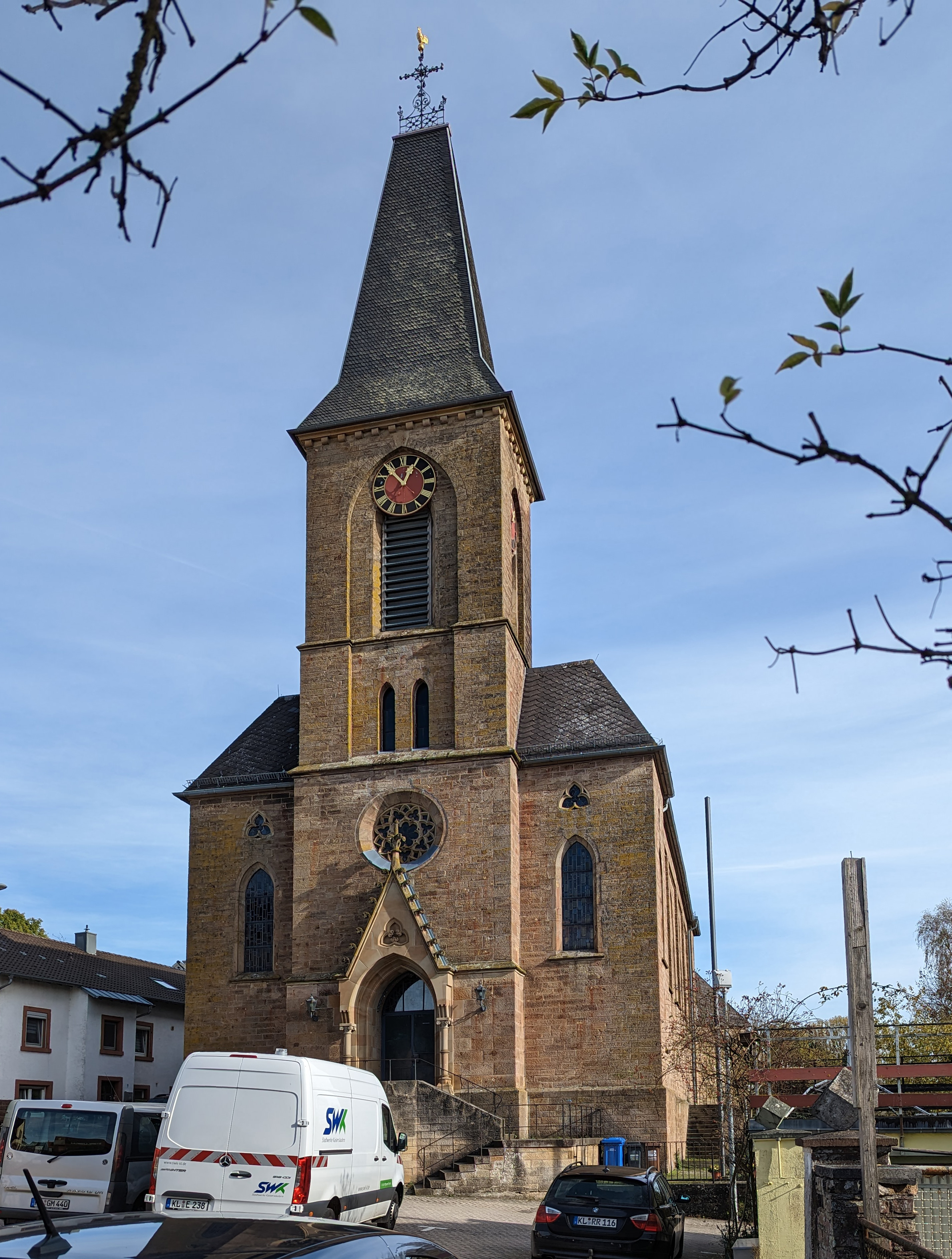

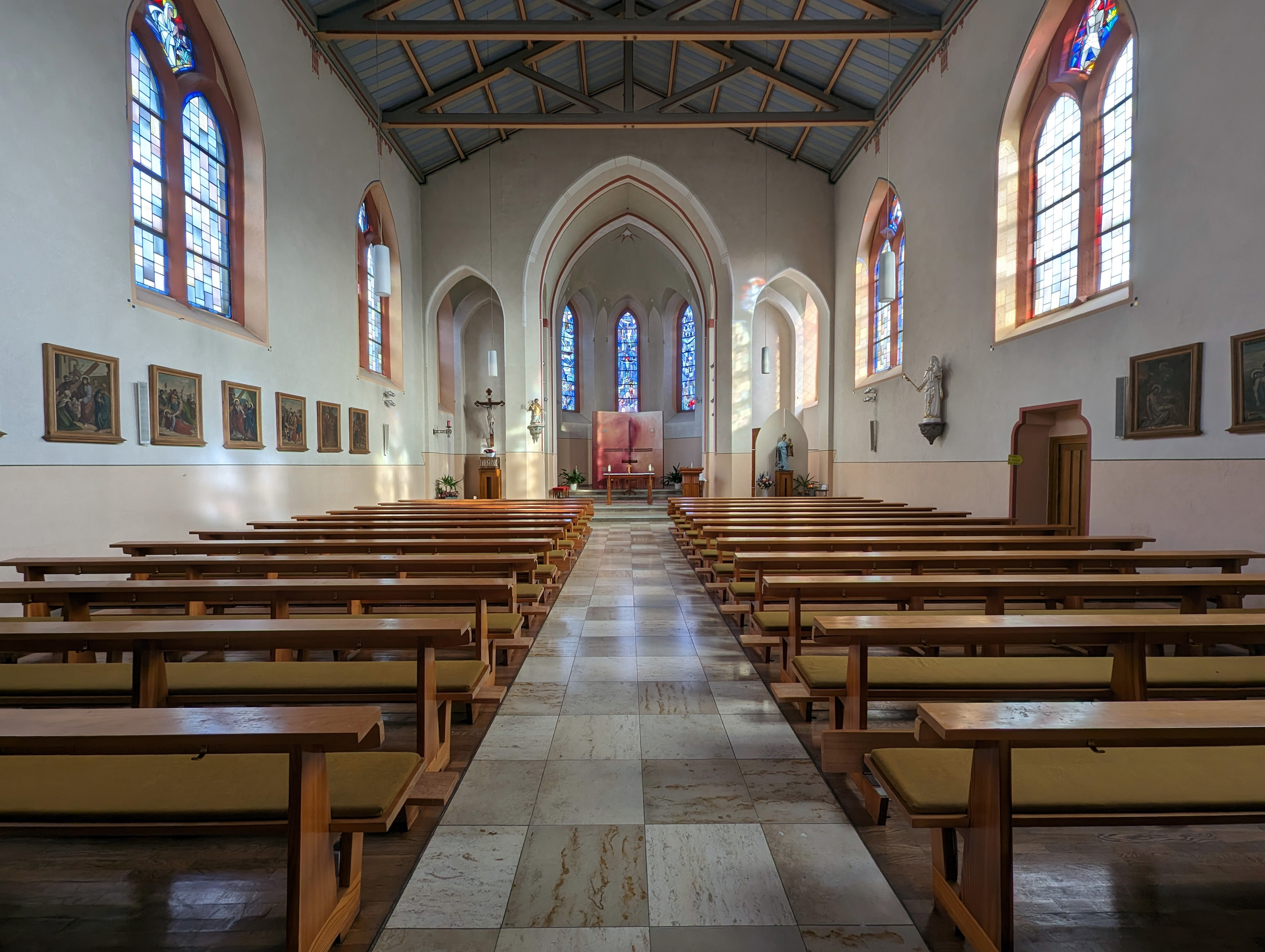

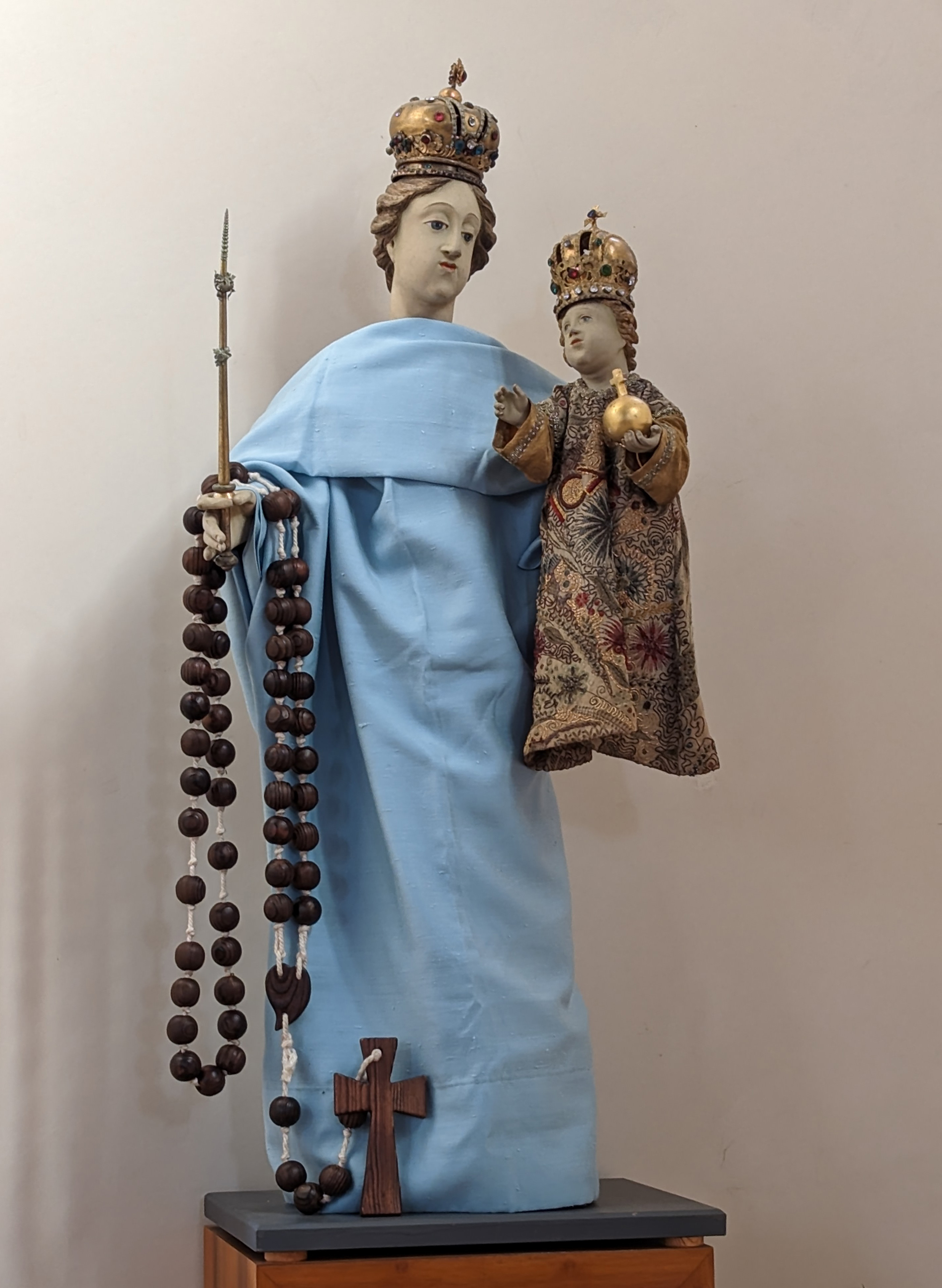

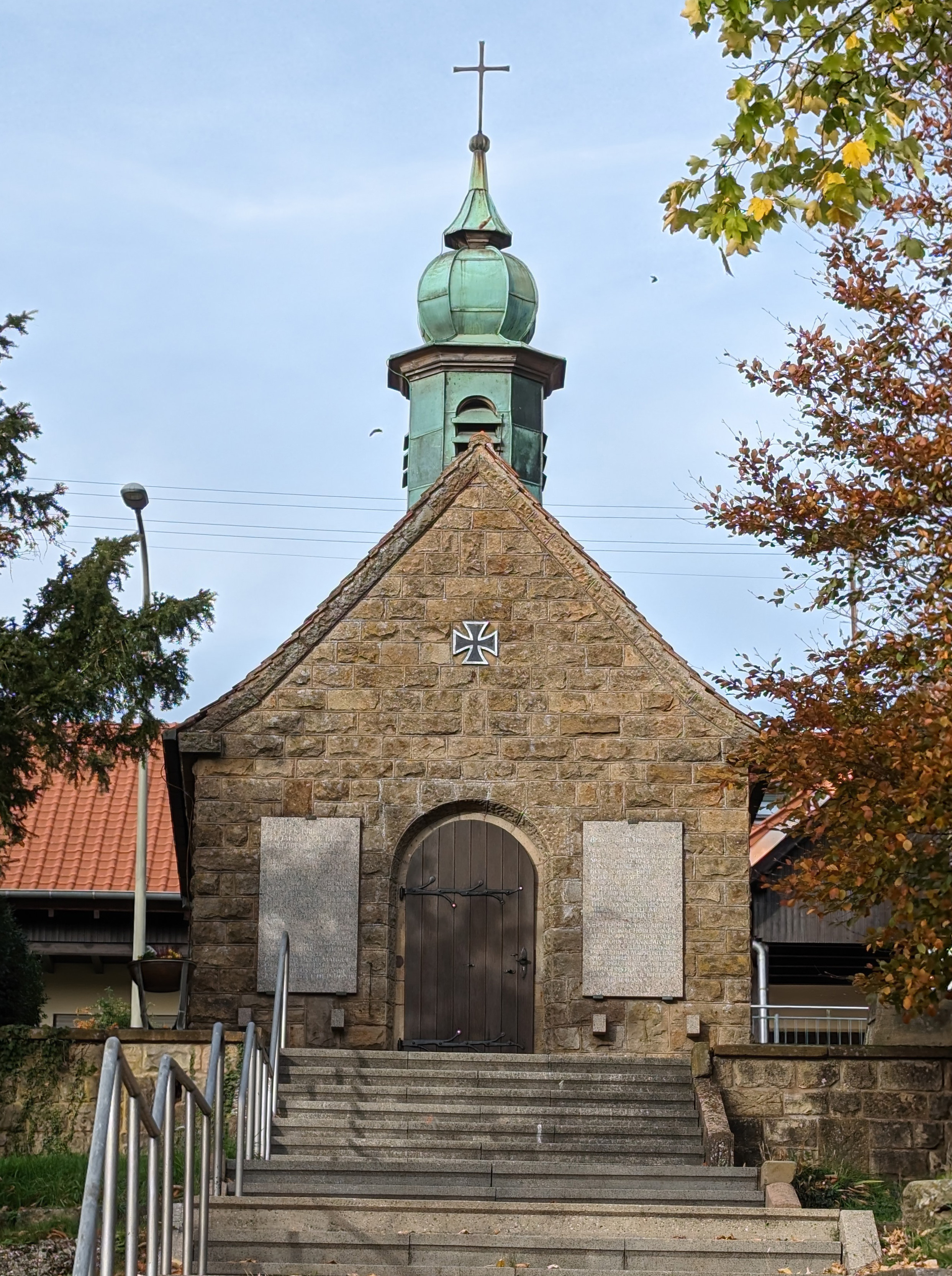

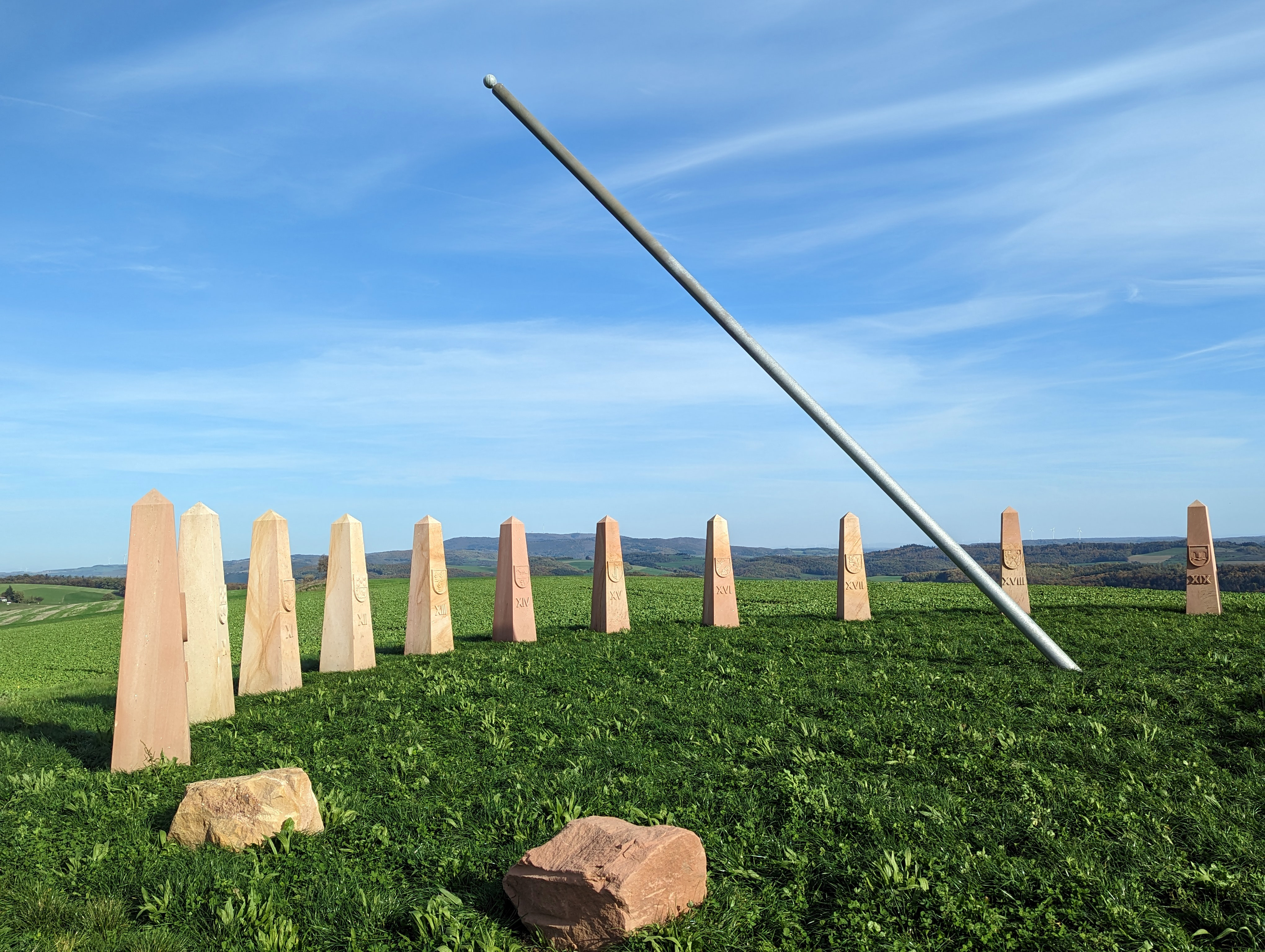

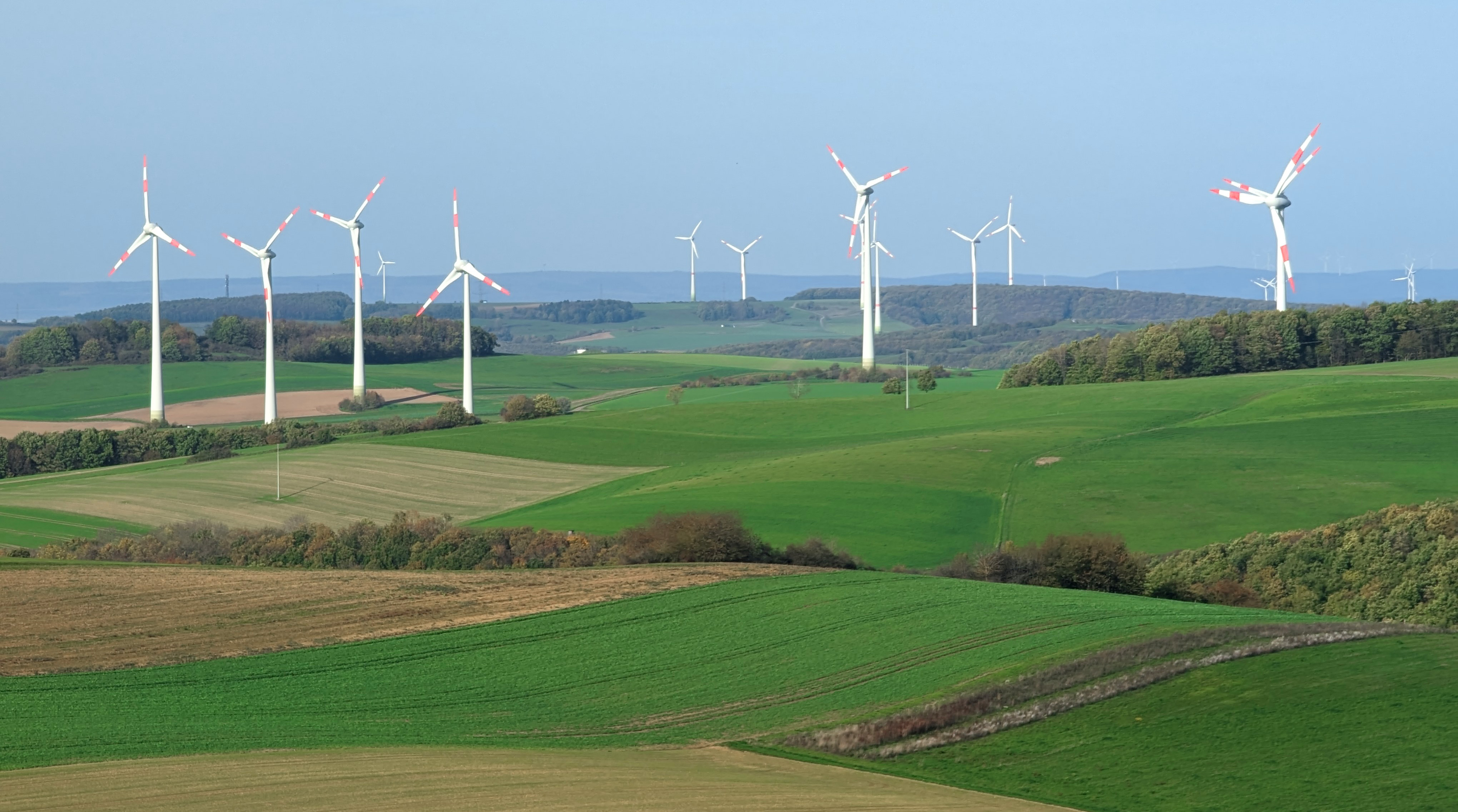
