= Otterberg =

- Town
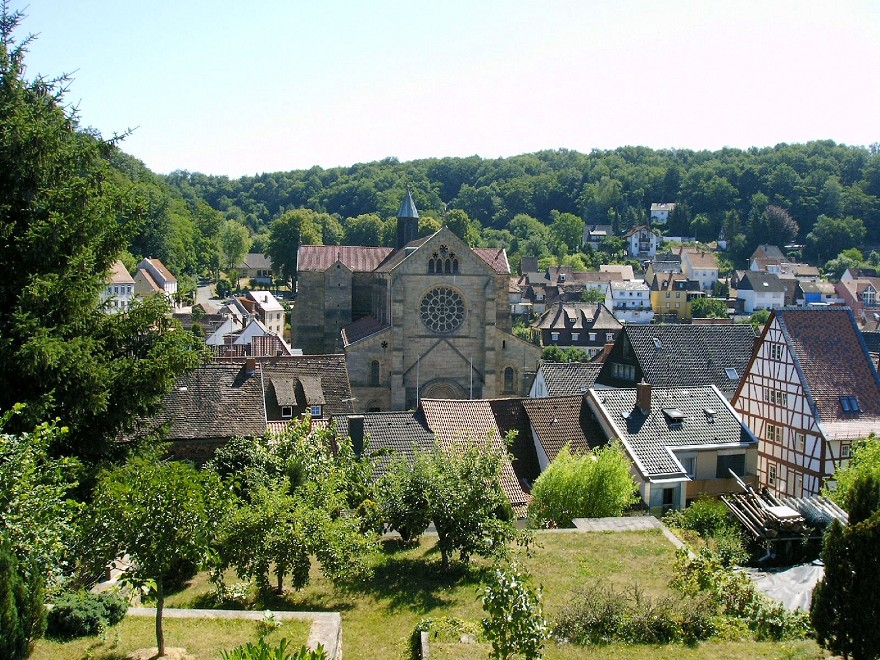

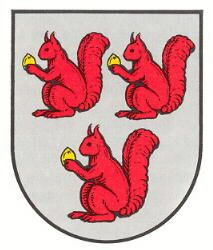
- Coat of arms

- Location of Otterberg within Kaiserslautern district
- Interactive map of Otterberg
- Location within Germany Location within Rhineland-Palatinate
- Coordinates: 49°30′16″N 7°46′16″E
- Country: Germany
- State: Rhineland-Palatinate
- District: Kaiserslautern
- Municipal assoc.: Otterbach-Otterberg

Government
  - Mayor (2019–24): Martina Stein (SPD)

Area
  - Total: 32.11 km^{2} (12.40 sq mi)
- Elevation: 247 m (810 ft)

Population (2025-12-31)
  - Total: 5,404
  - Density: 168.3/km^{2} (435.9/sq mi)
- Time zone: UTC+01:00 (CET)
  - Summer (DST): UTC+02:00 (CEST)
- Postal codes: 67697
- Dialling codes: 06301
- Vehicle registration: KL
- Website: www.otterberg.de

Otterberg (German pronunciation: [ˈɔtɐˌbɛʁk]) is a town in the district of Kaiserslautern in the German state of Rhineland-Palatinate with about 7,350 (as of 6/2006) inhabitants. It is situated approximately 7 kilometres (4 mi) north of Kaiserslautern.

Otterberg is the seat of the Verbandsgemeinde ("collective municipality") Otterbach-Otterberg.

== History ==
The following events occurred, in each year:

- 1143 The monastery was established.
- 1168 Construction of the monastery began.
- 1254 The church was inaugurated on May 10.
- 1380 The monastery was in steady decline beginning about 1380 until the 15th century.
- 1504 During the Bavaria-Landshut War of Succession, the monastery was plundered.
- 1525 During the German Peasants' War (Bauernkrieg); the insurgent peasants fell on the remainder of the monastery.
- 1556 The Reformation was introduced to the area.
- 1559 The remaining monks were instructed to convert.
- 1561 The last Abbott Wendelin Merbot left the monastery.
- 1564 The monastery was left open. The gates of Otterberg were opened.
- 1579 Pfalzgraf Johann Casimir invited religious refugees from the Spanish Netherlands to settle Otterberg and there was active settlement by the Walloons. They used the stones of the monastery complex for the building of their houses, so that today only the abbey church and the chapter hall remain.
- 1581 Gained town privileges from Pfalzgraf (Count-Palatine) Johann Casimir.
- 1582 to 1593 Many previous residents of Otterberg were in Frankenthal.
- 1618 to 1648 The Thirty Years' War severely affected the area.
- 1650 Existing church records in Otterberg begin.
- 1689 Many residents of Otterberg arrived in Holzappel under the leadership of Charles Faucher after a long period of wandering after fleeing Otterberg due to the War of the League of Augsburg which lasted from 1688 to 1697.
- 1708 Joint use of the church by the Protestants and Catholics led to problems. The solution was to add a wall inside the church so that the Catholic part (in the transept) was separated from the Protestant part (in the nave).
- 1979 During a very extensive restoration project, this wall was removed. The church is now shared by both church communities.

== Objects of interest ==
- Otterberg Abbey: Part a former Cistercian monastery, this abbey church is the second largest in the Palatinate (after the Speyer Cathedral). The church was built between 1168 and 1254. The monastery reached its peak around the year 1340 and declined around 1561. In 1579 groups of refugees of the reformed faith arrived from the Spanish Netherlands and from northern France.

== Personalities ==
=== Sons and Daughters of the City ===
- Guillaume de Felice, 4th Comte de Panzutti (1803–1871), a Savoy nobleman, theologian and abolitionist
- Johann Heinrich Roos (September 29, 1631 -October 3, 1685), a German Baroque era painter and etcher
- Isidor Straus, born February 6, 1845, owner of the Macy's department store and served as a Congressional Representative. He and his wife Ida died April 15, 1912, on board the RMS Titanic.
- Nathan Straus (January 31, 1848 – January 11, 1931), an American merchant and philanthropist (brother of Isidor)
- Oscar Straus (December 23, 1850 – May 3, 1926), United States Secretary of Commerce and Labor under President Theodore Roosevelt from 1906 to 1909 (brother of Isidor)
