= Palatine Ways of St. James =

Camino de Santiago pilgrimage routes starting in Germany

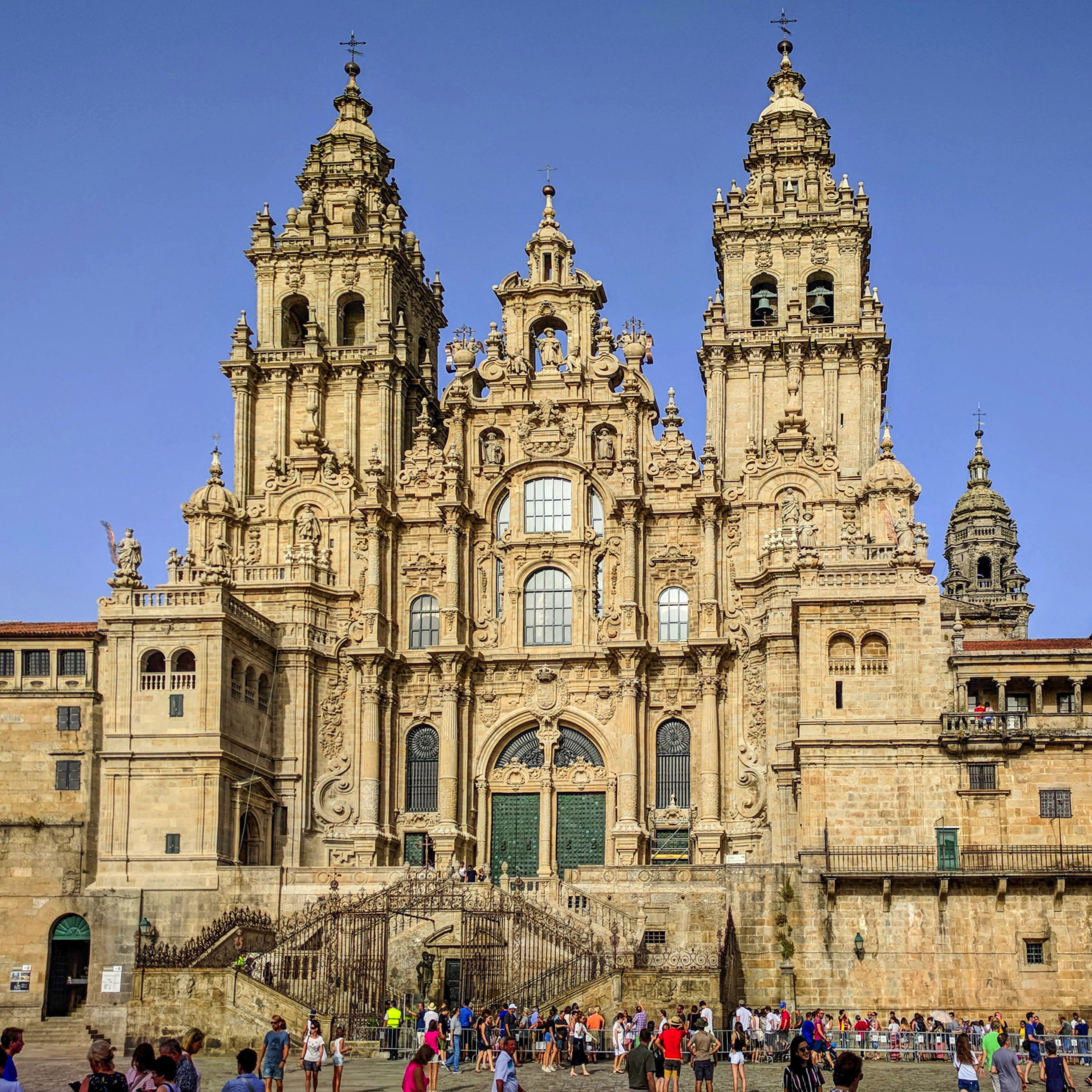
- Destination of all the Ways of St. James: the cathedral of Santiago de Compostela
- Length: 125 km (north route), 125 bzw. 112 km (south route)
- Location: Palatinate (Rhineland-Palatinate), north route c. 5 km in Saarpfalz-Kreis (Saarland), abbey route through North Palatinate into the Saarland
- Trailheads: Speyer (north and south routes), Worms (abbey route); Hornbach and Blieskastel
- Use: Fernwanderweg
- Difficulty: easy
- Season: all year round
- Waymark: (scallop)

The Palatine Ways of St. James (German: Pfälzer Jakobswege) are those sections of the Way of St. James in the Palatinate region of Germany and part of the historic pilgrimage route to the northwest Spanish town of Santiago de Compostela. It was there that, according to Christian tradition, the Apostle Saint James the Greater was buried.

== Overview ==
Several such pilgrimage routes within the Palatinate have become known. Two, the North Route (Nordroute) and the South Route (Südroute), begin at the River Rhine at the imperial cathedral of Speyer and end in the small town of Hornbach (Südwestpfalz county), where the grave of Saint Pirmin is found in the former abbey. South of Hornbach the now united pilgrimage route crosses the border into France. Both Palatine routes are waymarked by the Palatine Forest Club and one link to the French pilgrimage routes follows. In the Palatine Forest old footpaths have been identified as parts of the Way of St. James.

Earlier sections of the Way of St. James converge from the north and east at Speyer. The northern route is well documented. From the southern boundary of Rhenish Hesse it should actually be counted as part of the Palatine Ways of St. James. It linked the two other imperial cathedrals in Mainz and Worms – via intermediate stations in Oppenheim and Frankenthal – with Speyer. In the south of Frankenthal, the district of Pilgerpfad that emerged after the Second World War took its name from the pilgrimage route. The Way crosses the middle of the district and is marked with the scallop symbol of St. James.

From 2007 to 2011 an Abbey Route (Klosterroute) was researched and described that ran from Worms through the Palatinate to Metz. This route joins the North Route at Landstuhl, but does not follow it to Hornbach. In Blieskastel it joins the route that comes from Hornbach via Saarbrücken to Lorraine.

== Routes ==
=== North Route ===
==== Course ====
The original, well-known route is the 125-kilometre-long North Route. It leaves Speyer, partly following the Speyerbach stream, in a westerly direction through the Anterior Palatinate part of the Upper Rhine Plain. Near Neustadt an der Weinstraße the route enters the Palatine Forest through the Haardt mountain chain. Here the Way of St. James heads through the Elmstein valley and generally climbs along the Speyerbach until it reaches the source region of the stream near Johanniskreuz. There, on the boundary between the Lower and Middle Frankenweide, it crosses the watershed between the Rhine and the River Moselle at a height of 470 metres. Next, it leaves the Palatine Forest heading downhill through the Karlstal valley following the Moosalb stream to the Gelterswoog lake. It then runs along the northern edge of the Sickingen Heights past the town of Landstuhl, only to descend near Vogelbach to the lowlands of the Landstuhl Marsh to the former pilgrimage church. From there the Way runs southwest, and later southwards, via the Zweibrücken Westrich. From the Schlossberg hill it grazes the borough of Homburg at Kirrberg. In the town of Zweibrücken the route crosses the Schwarzbach stream and enters the water meadows of its left tributary, the Hornbach. It follows this stream uphill and finally reaches its eponymous pilgrimage village coming from the north.

==== Stations ====
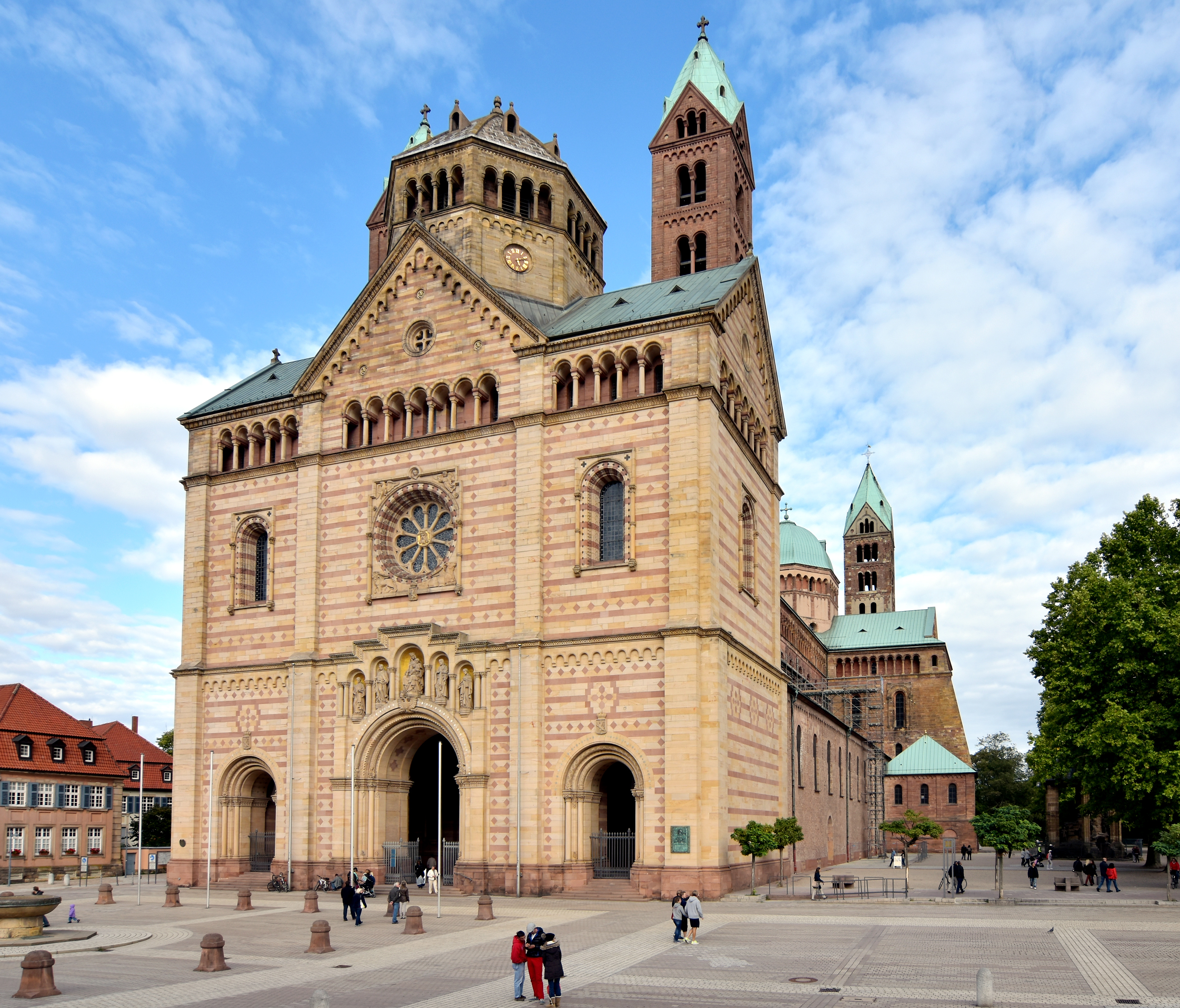
The start at the cathedral in Speyer

Dudenhofen

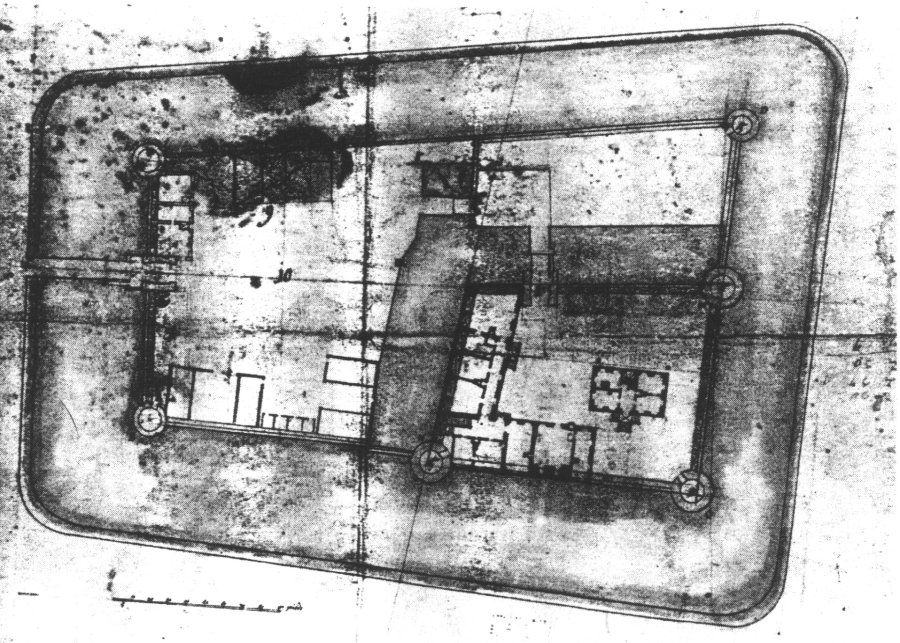
Ehem. Marientraut Palace in Hanhofen

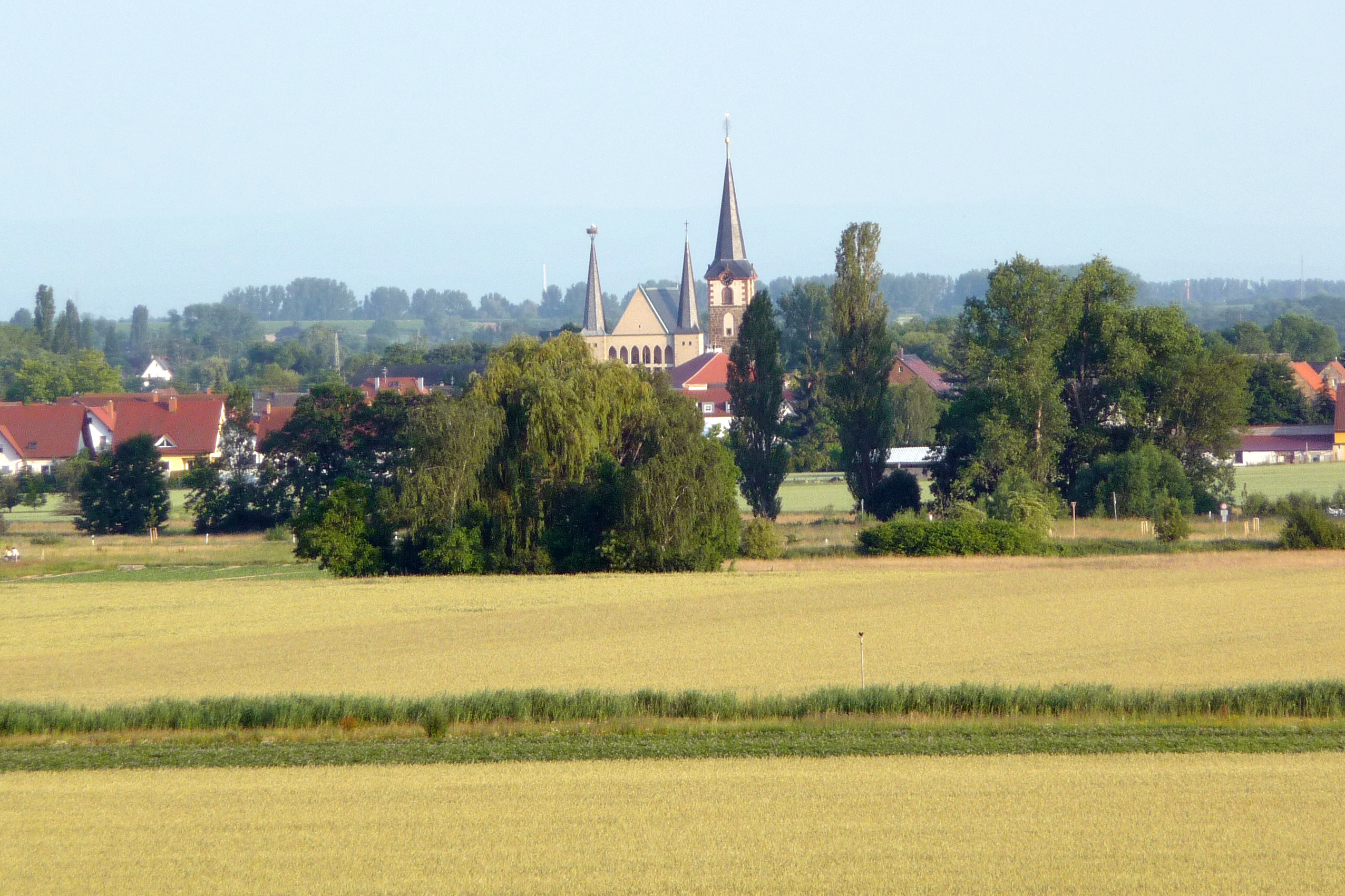
Geinsheim

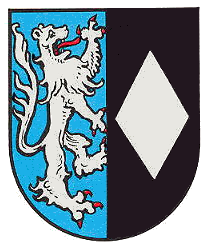
Duttweiler

Kirrweiler

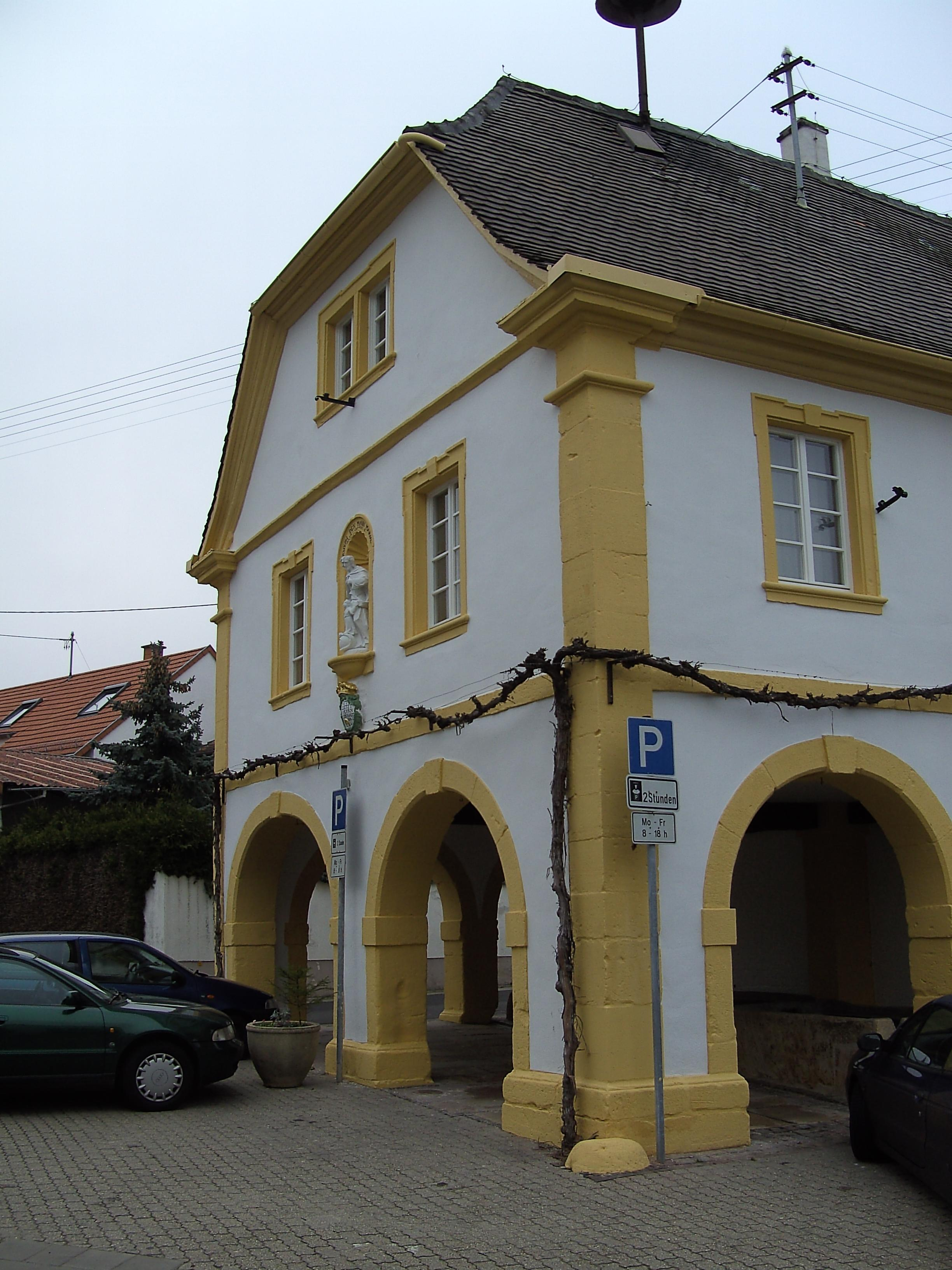
Diedesfeld

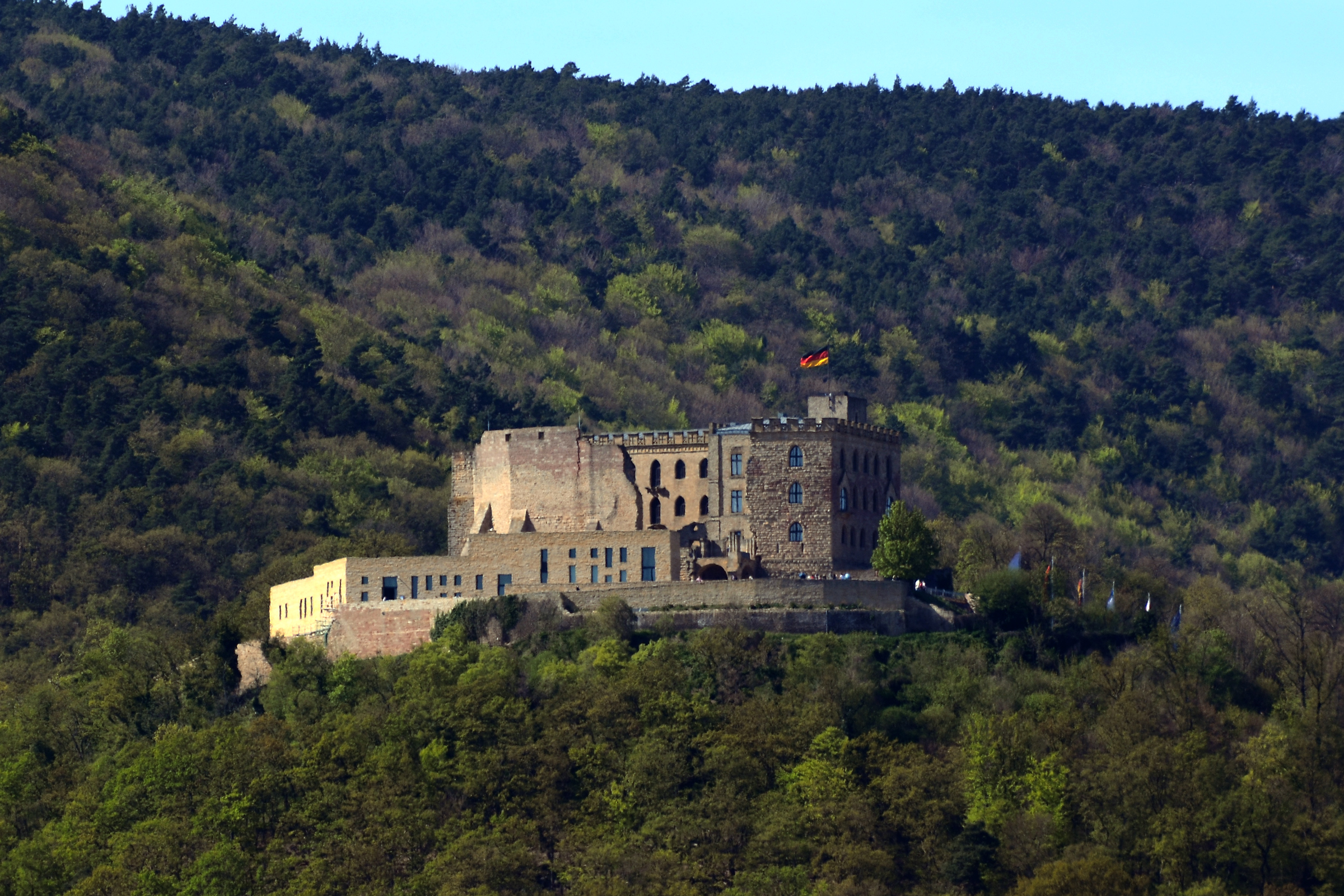
The castle above Hambach

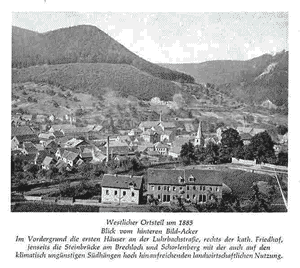
Lambrecht in the 19th century

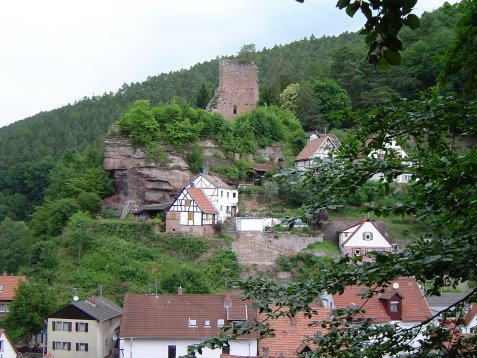
Elmstein

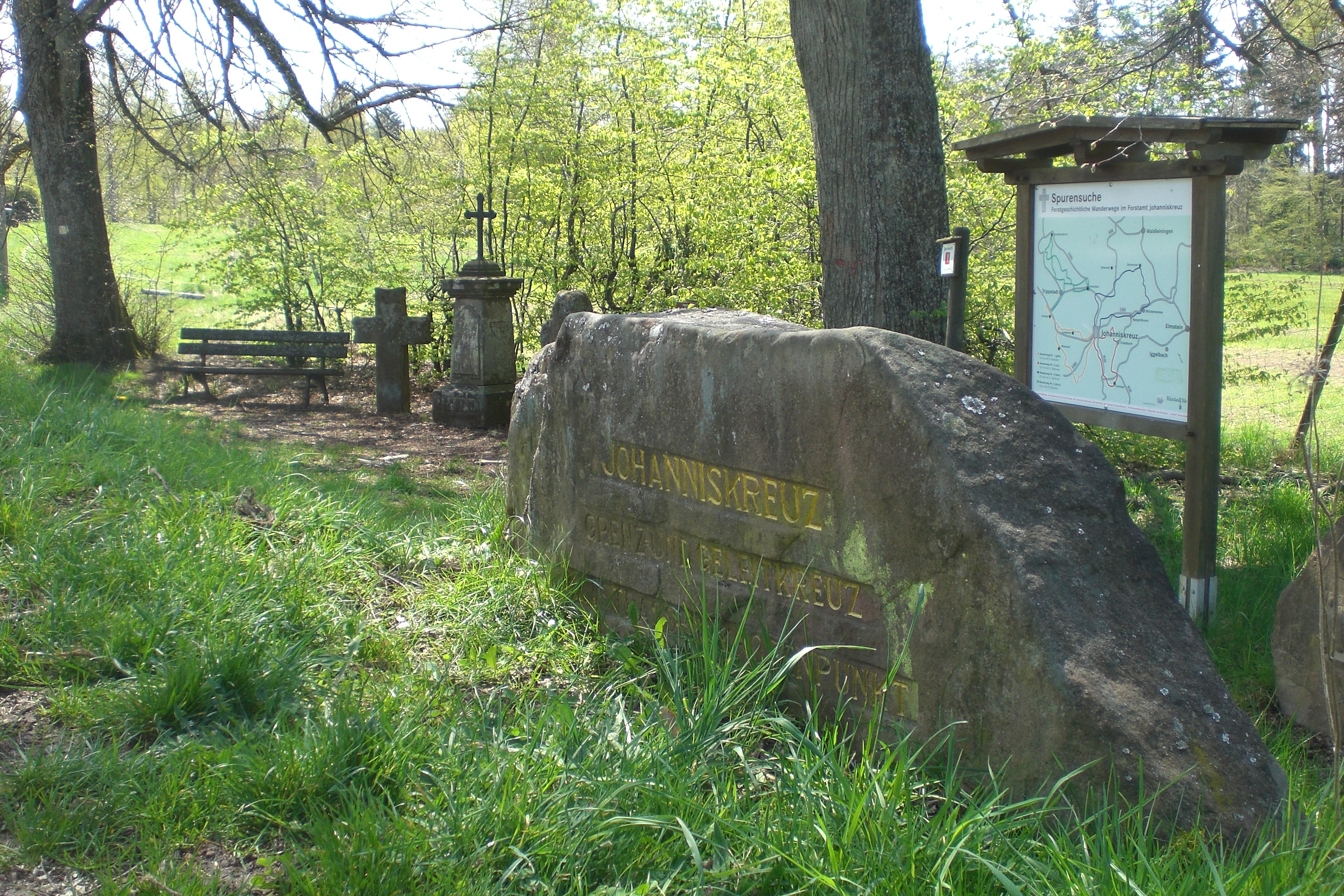
Johanniskreuz

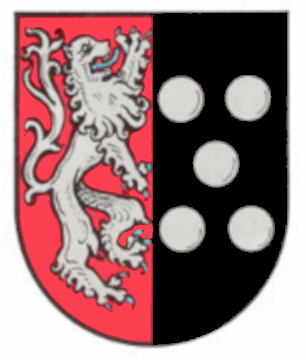
Bann

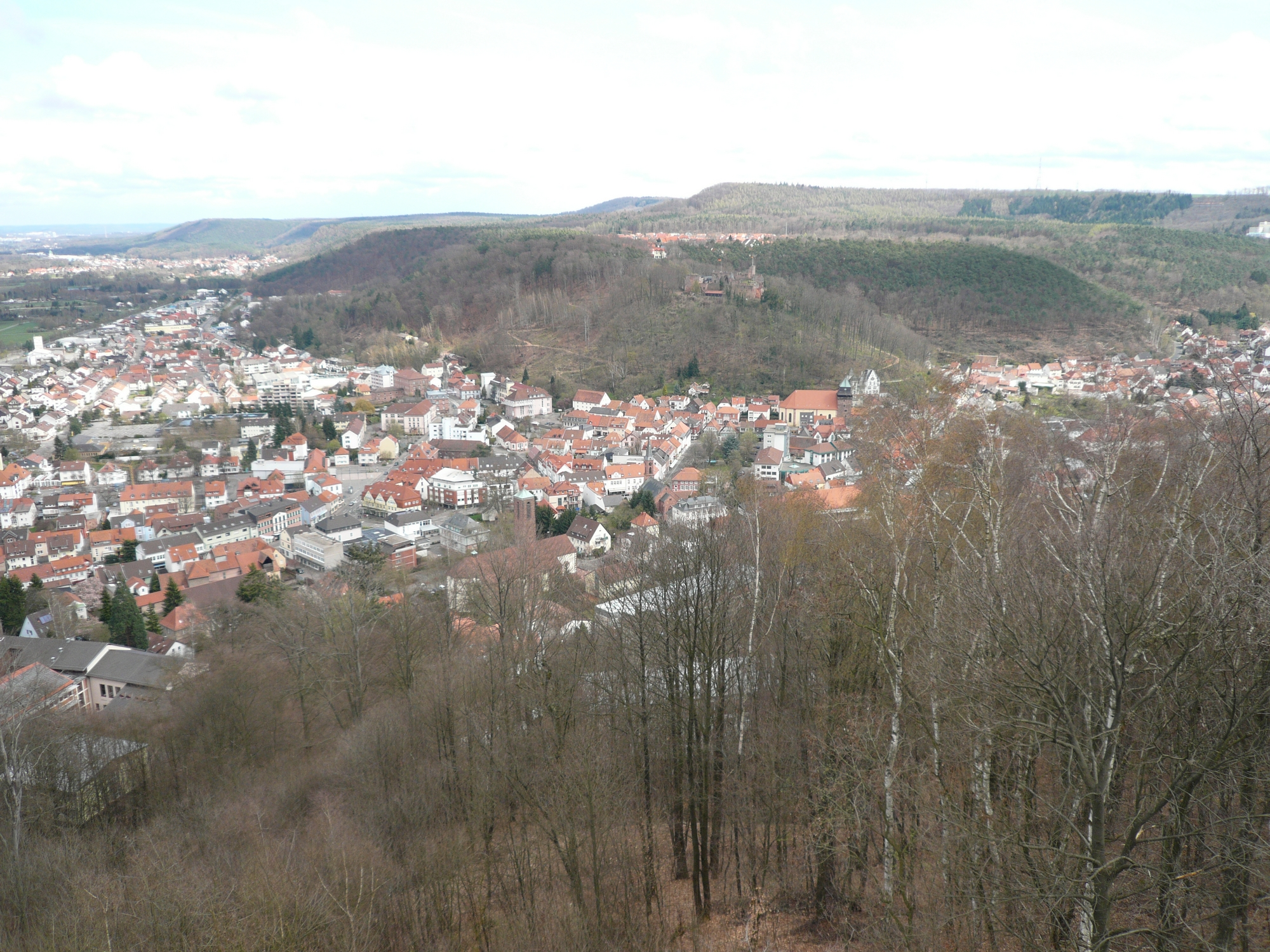
Sickingen's town of Landstuhl

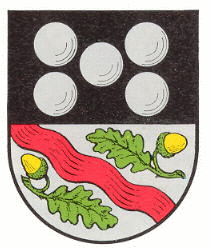
Hauptstuhl

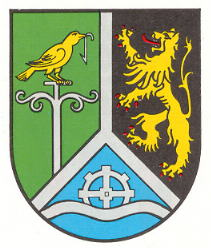
Bruchmühlbach-Miesau

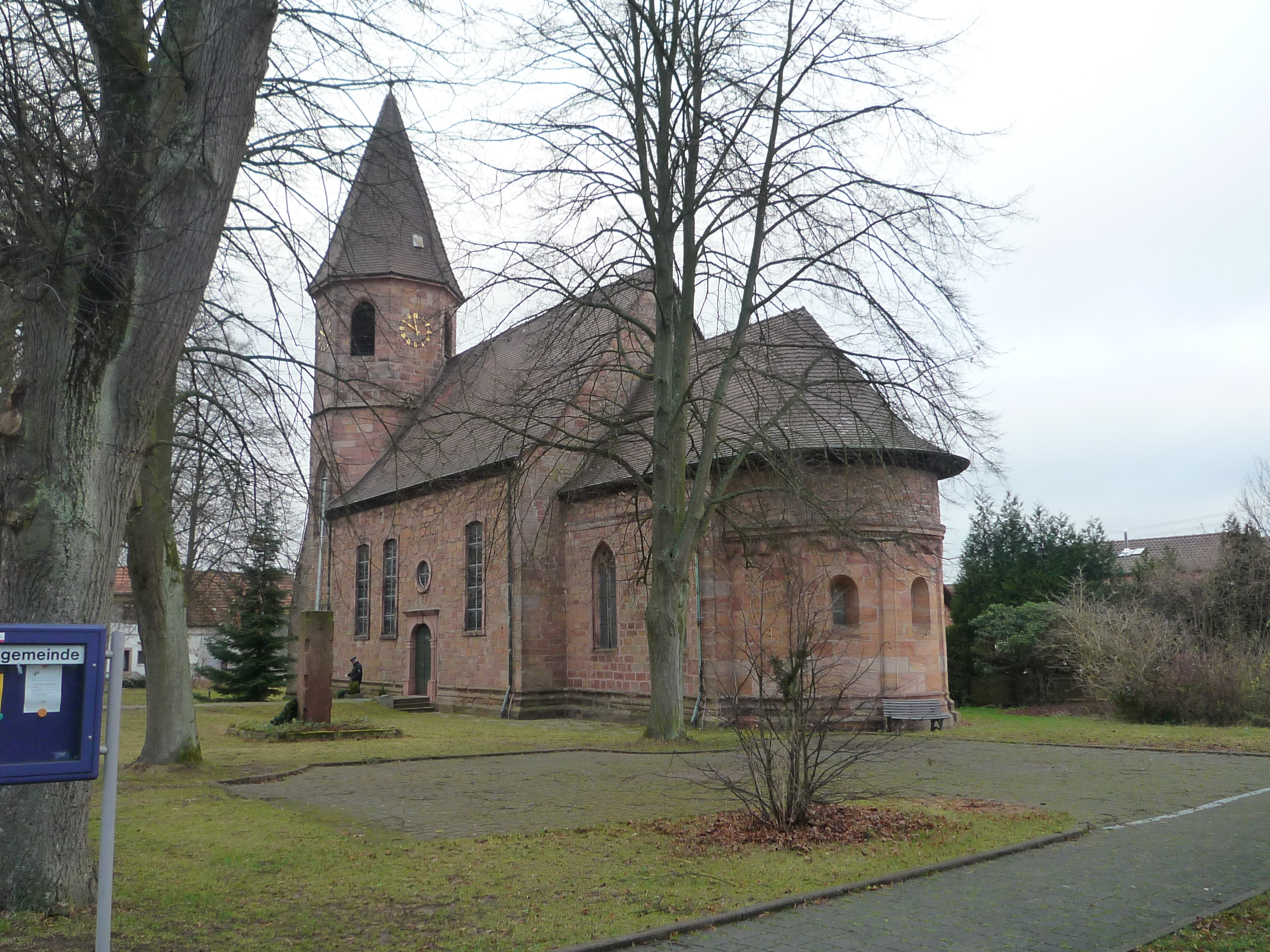
Former pilgrim church in Vogelbach

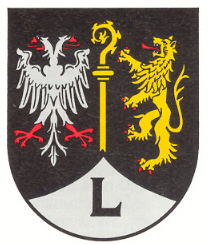
Lambsborn

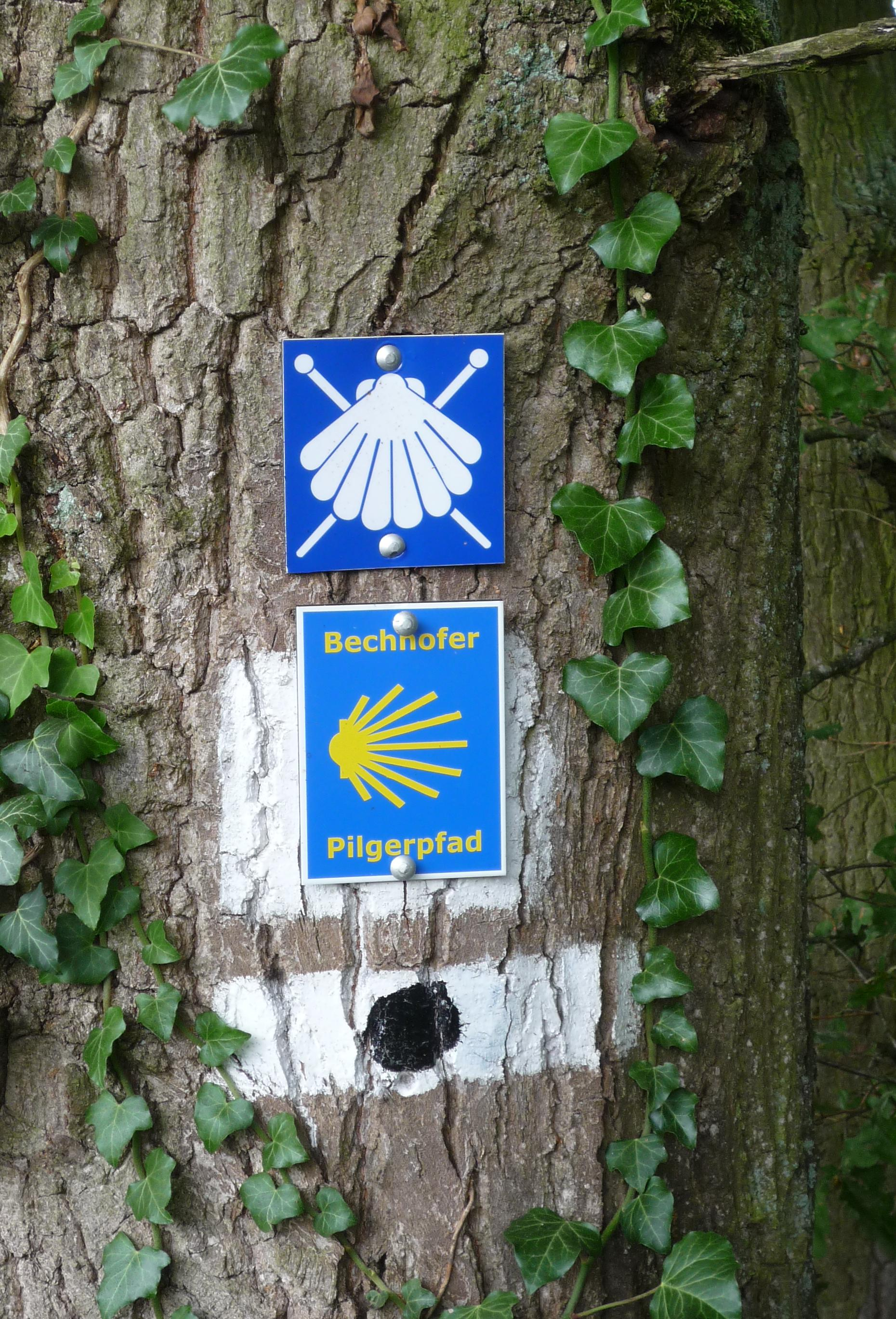
Waymark near Bechhofen

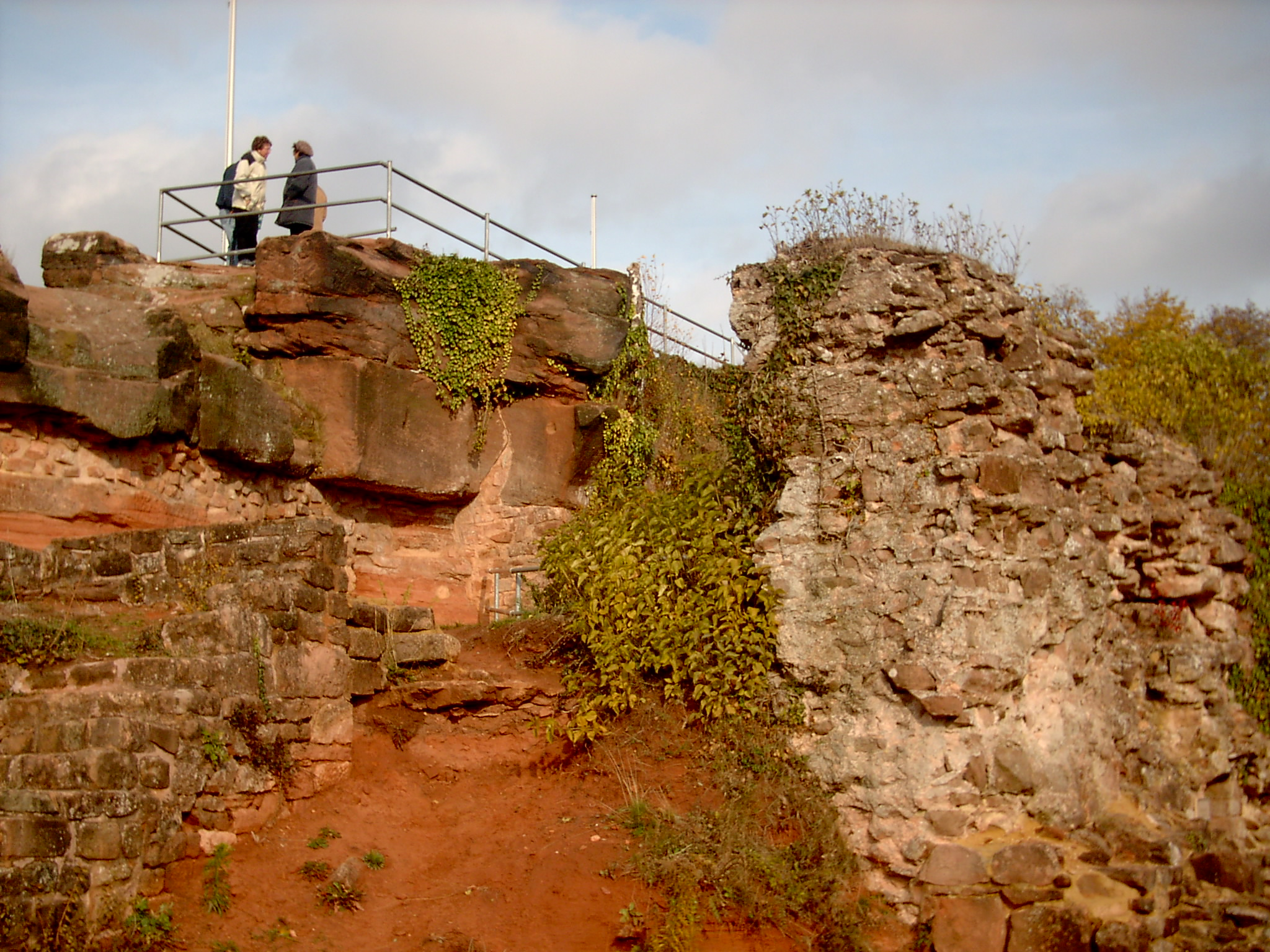
Hohenburg castle ruins in Homburg

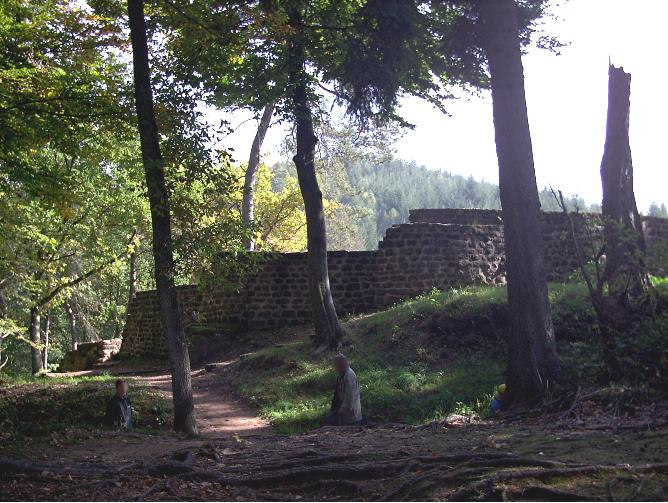
Merburg near Kirrberg

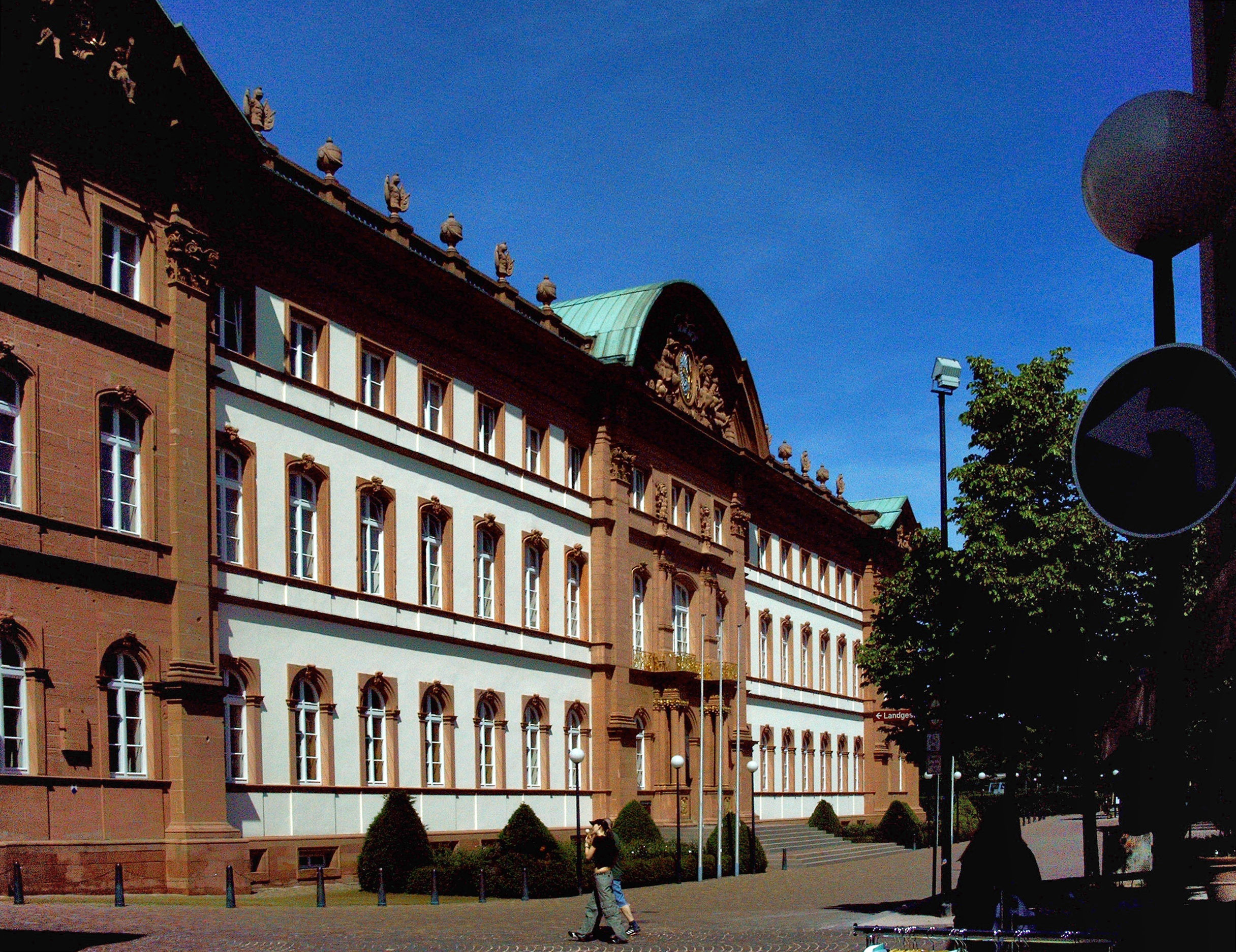
The palace in Zweibrücken

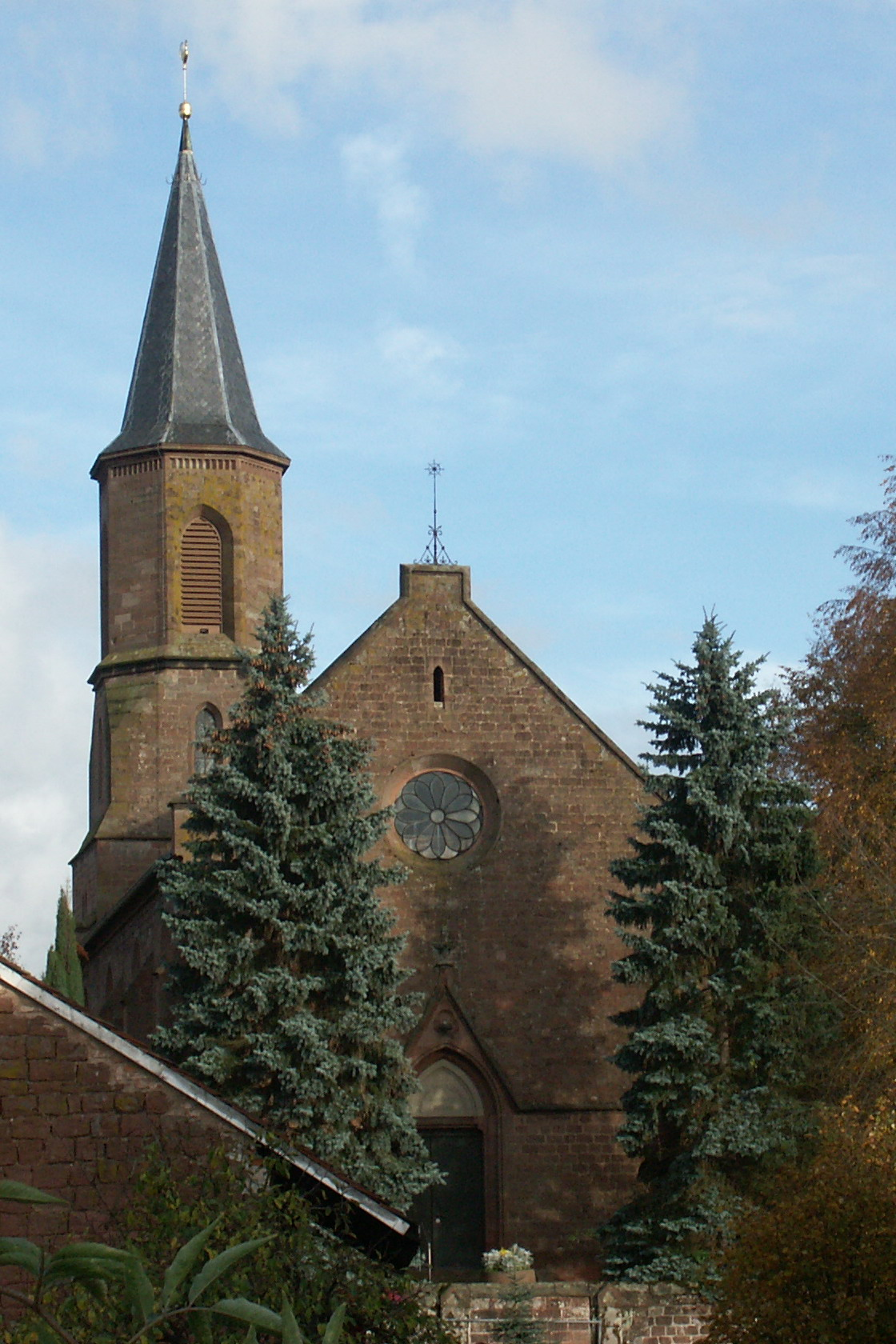
Althornbach

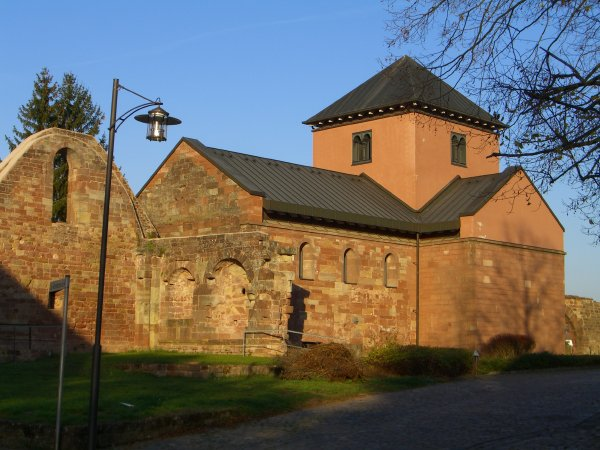
The abbey at Hornbach with St. Pirmin's grave

=== South Route ===
==== Course ====
Later, a southern route was also recorded. This branch runs through the southern Palatine Forest, the German part of the Wasgau. The Way runs initially from Speyer towards the south gradually ascending the Rhine valley as far as its confluence with the Klingbach in an old loop in the Rhine that, since the straightening of the Rhine, has been called the Michelsbach. The route then follows the Klingbach westwards through the South Palatinate part of the Rhine Plain.

The adjoining bend to the north via Landau, whose stations are marked with an asterisk (*), is a considerable detour (26 instead of 13 kilometres); it is not authentic but was introduced for touristic reasons. For pilgrims it was clearly more sensible to take the direct route from Herxheim continuing along the Klingbach to Klingenmünster and the Palatine Forest, a saving of 3 hours journey time.

The route now crosses the Wasgau – initially in the valley of the Erlenbach stream and then along the present-day French border – in a northwesterly direction, before arriving at Hornbach from the east, from the Hackmesserseite region. The entire route of the longer variant via Landau is 125 kilometres long, the more likely direct route upstream along the Klingbach is only 112 kilometres long.

==== Stations ====
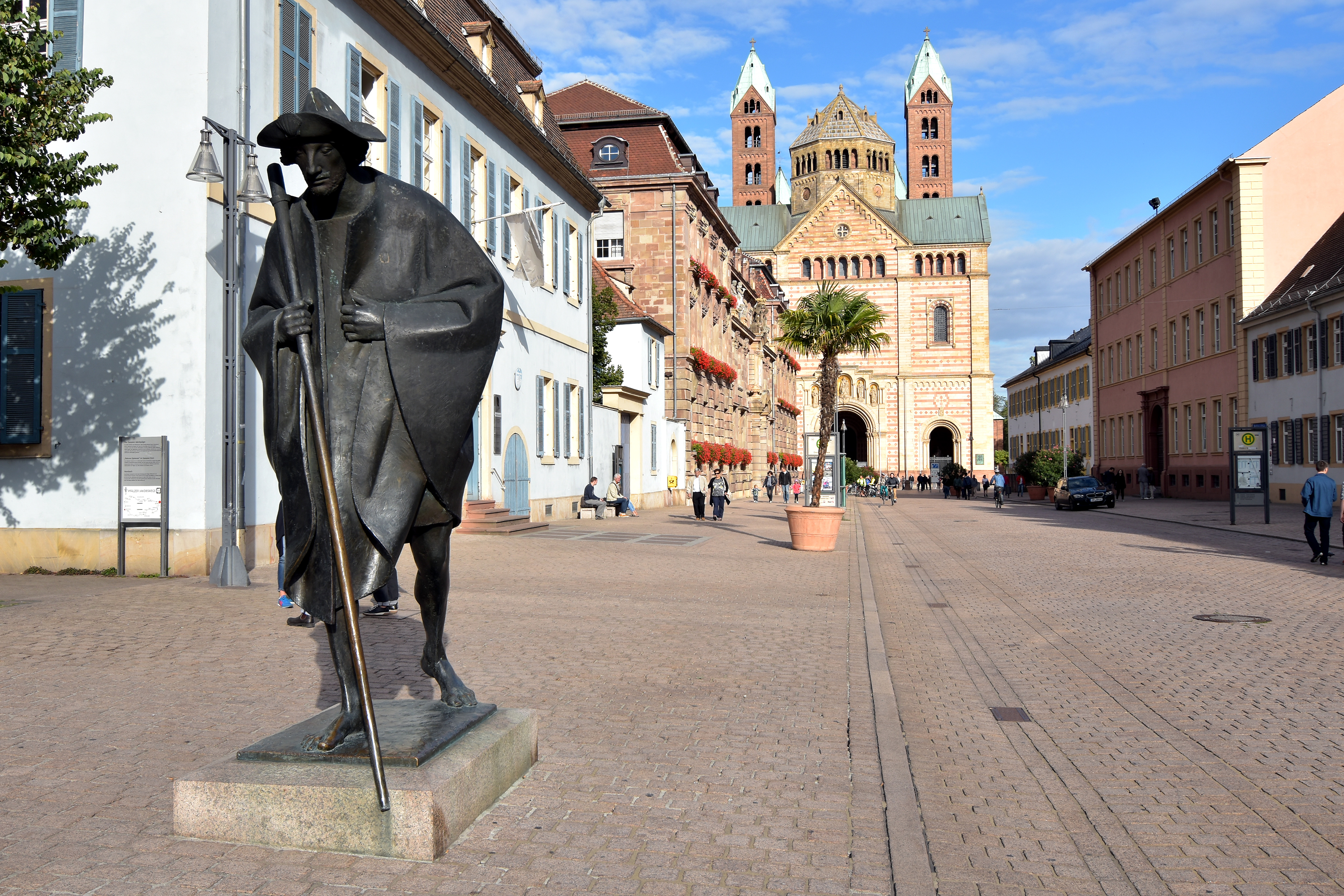
Start at the cathedral (near Jakobspilger) in Speyer

Berghausen and Mechtersheim, today in the municipality of Römerberg

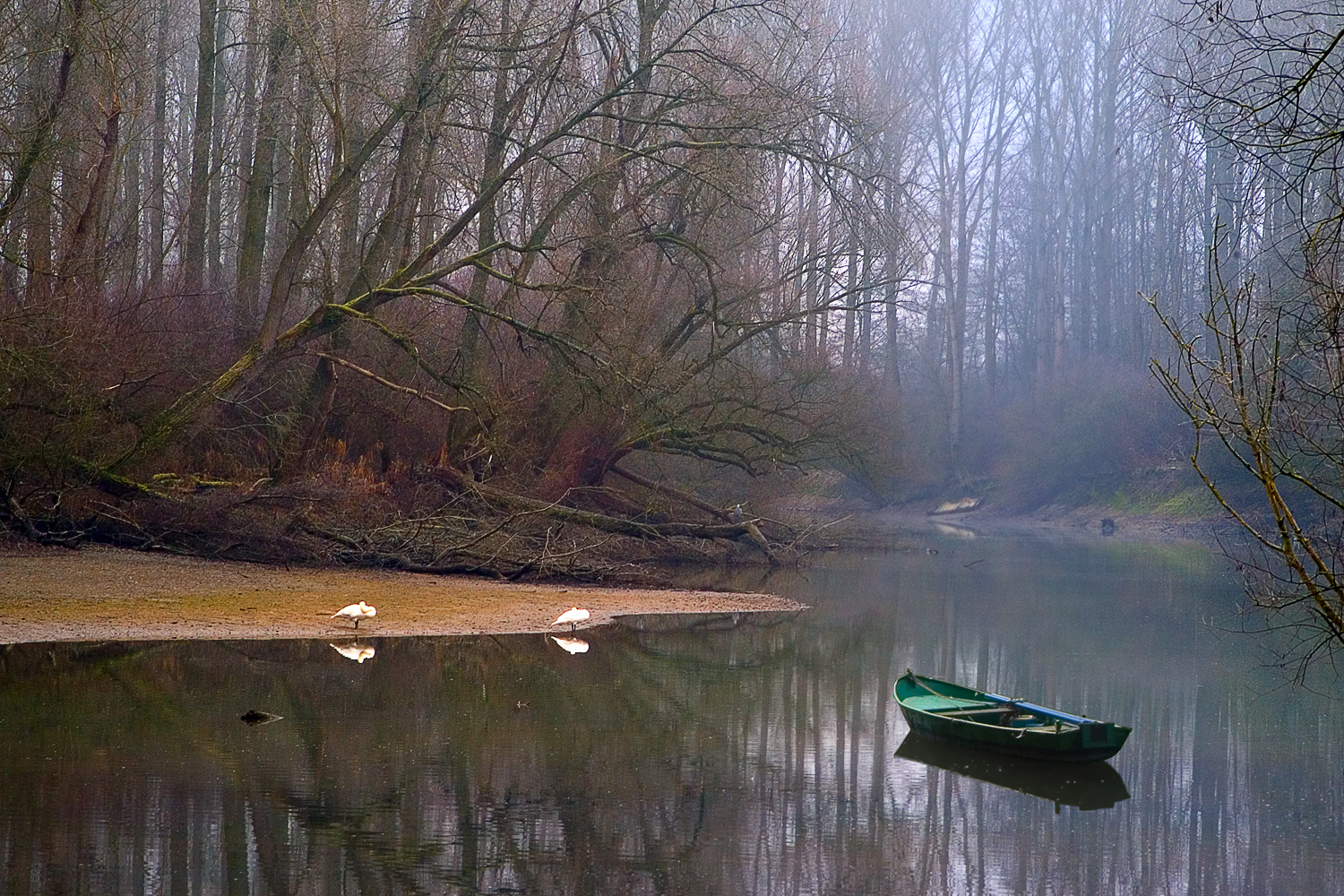
Lingenfeld

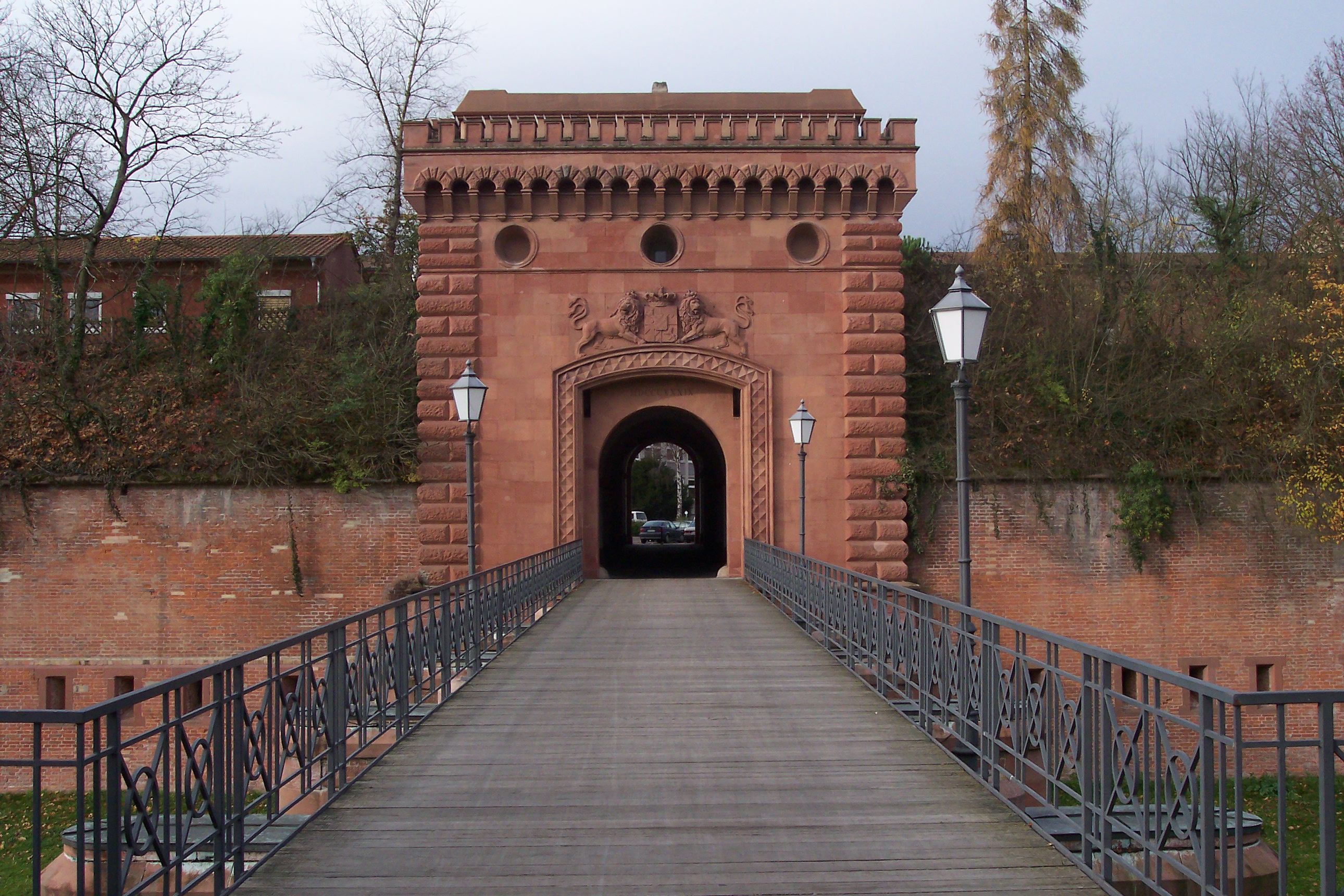
Germersheim

Sondernheim

Hördt

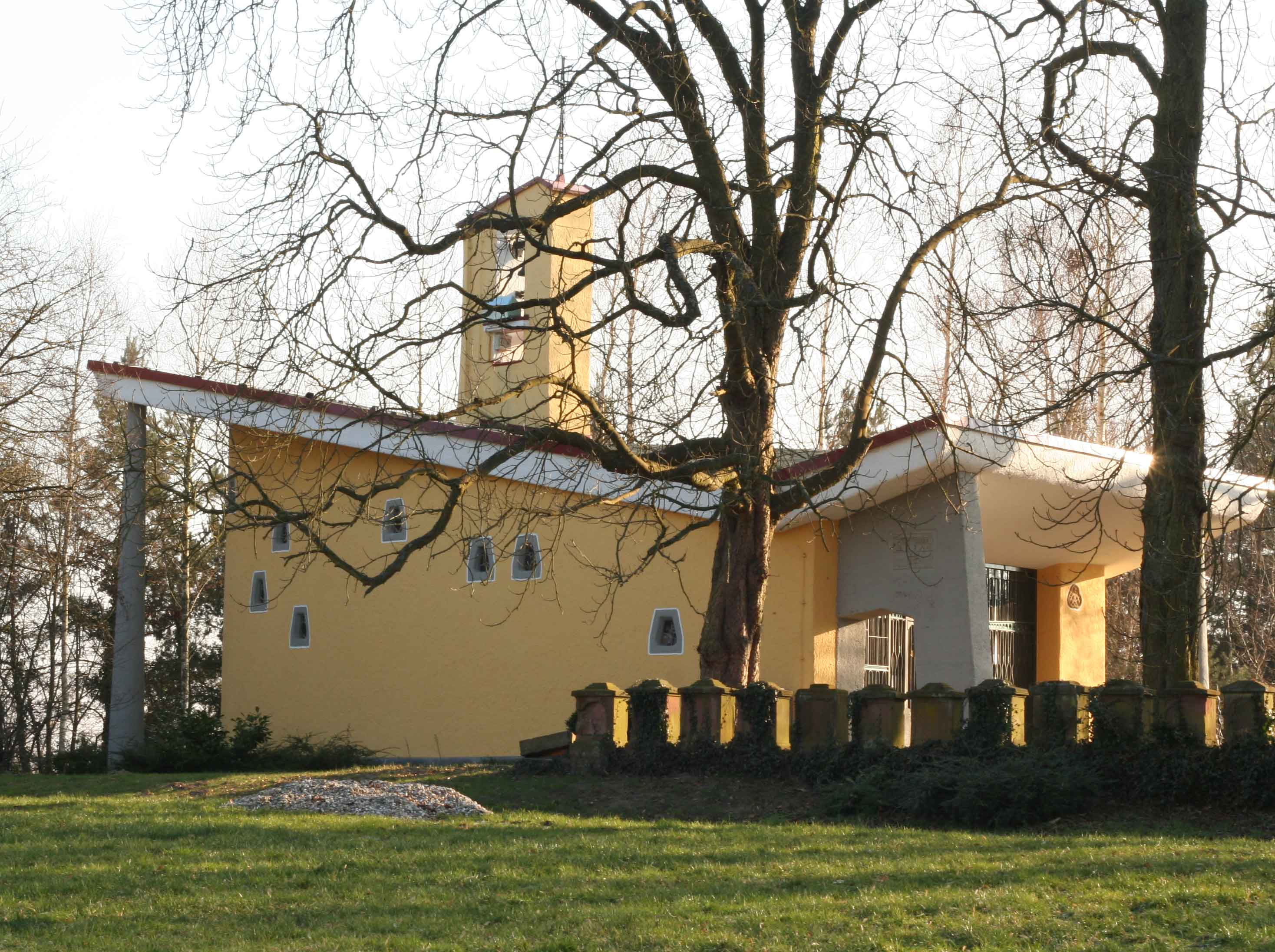
Dieterskirchel near Rülzheim

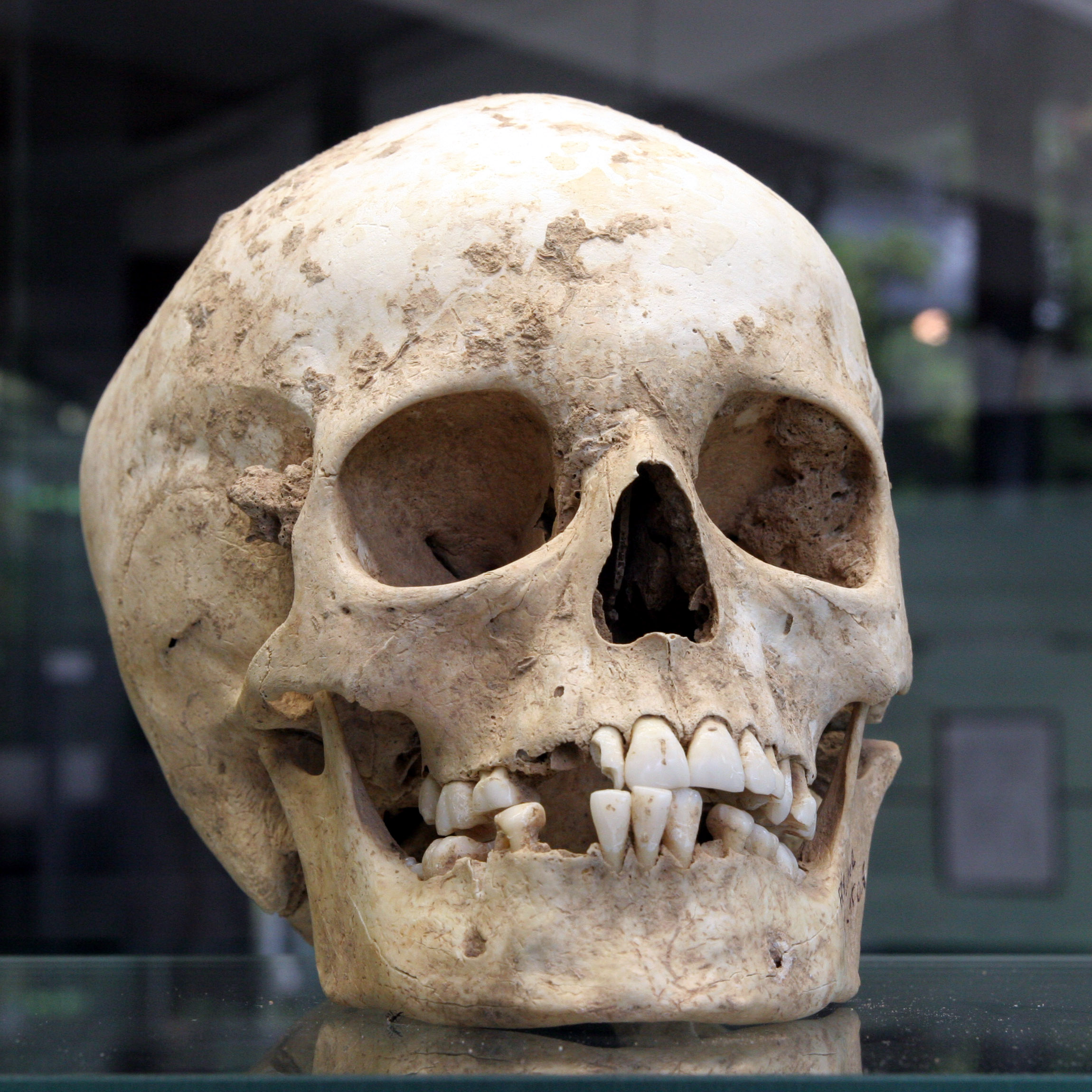
New Stone Age excavations in Herxheim

Offenbach*

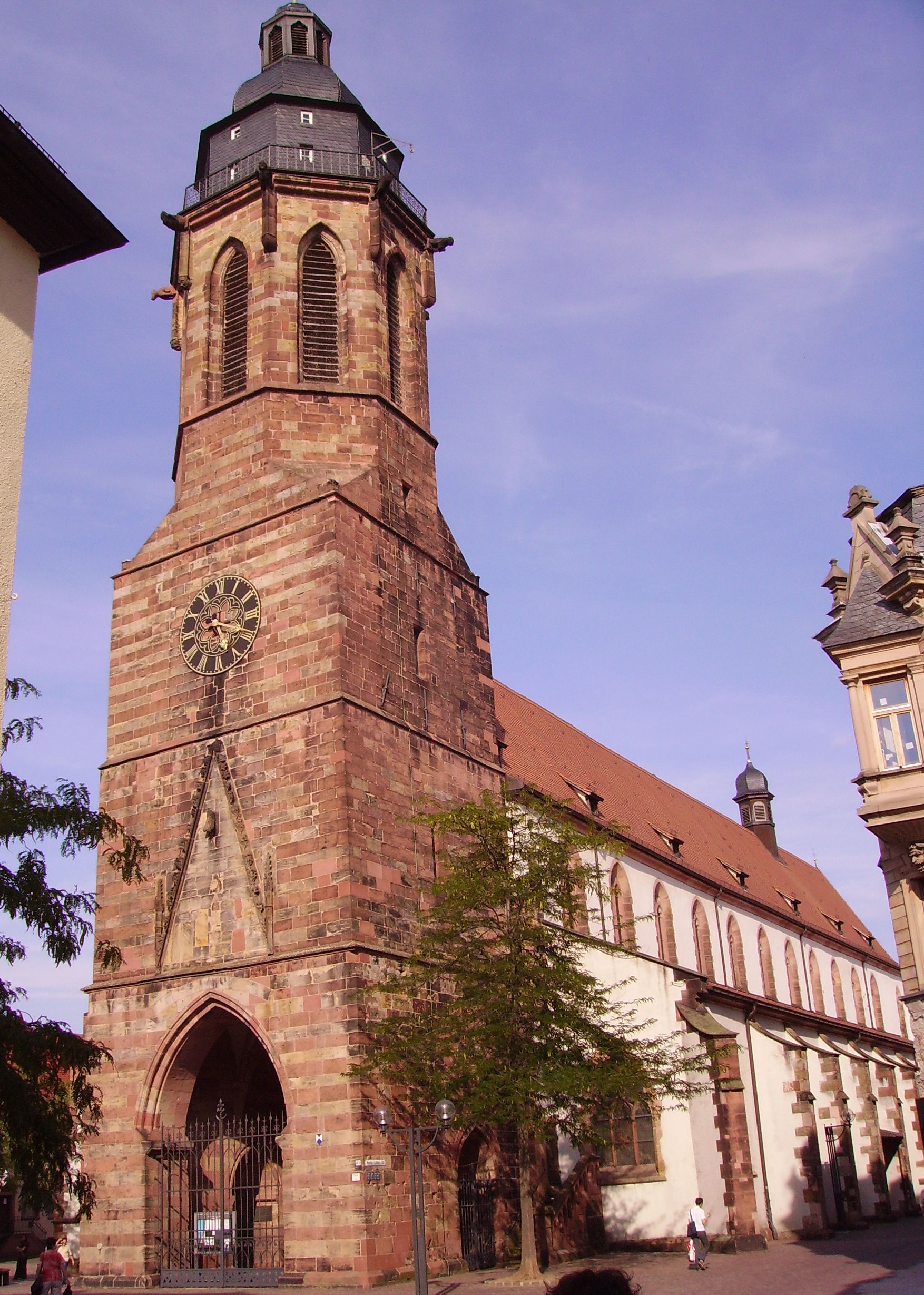
Abbey church in Landau*

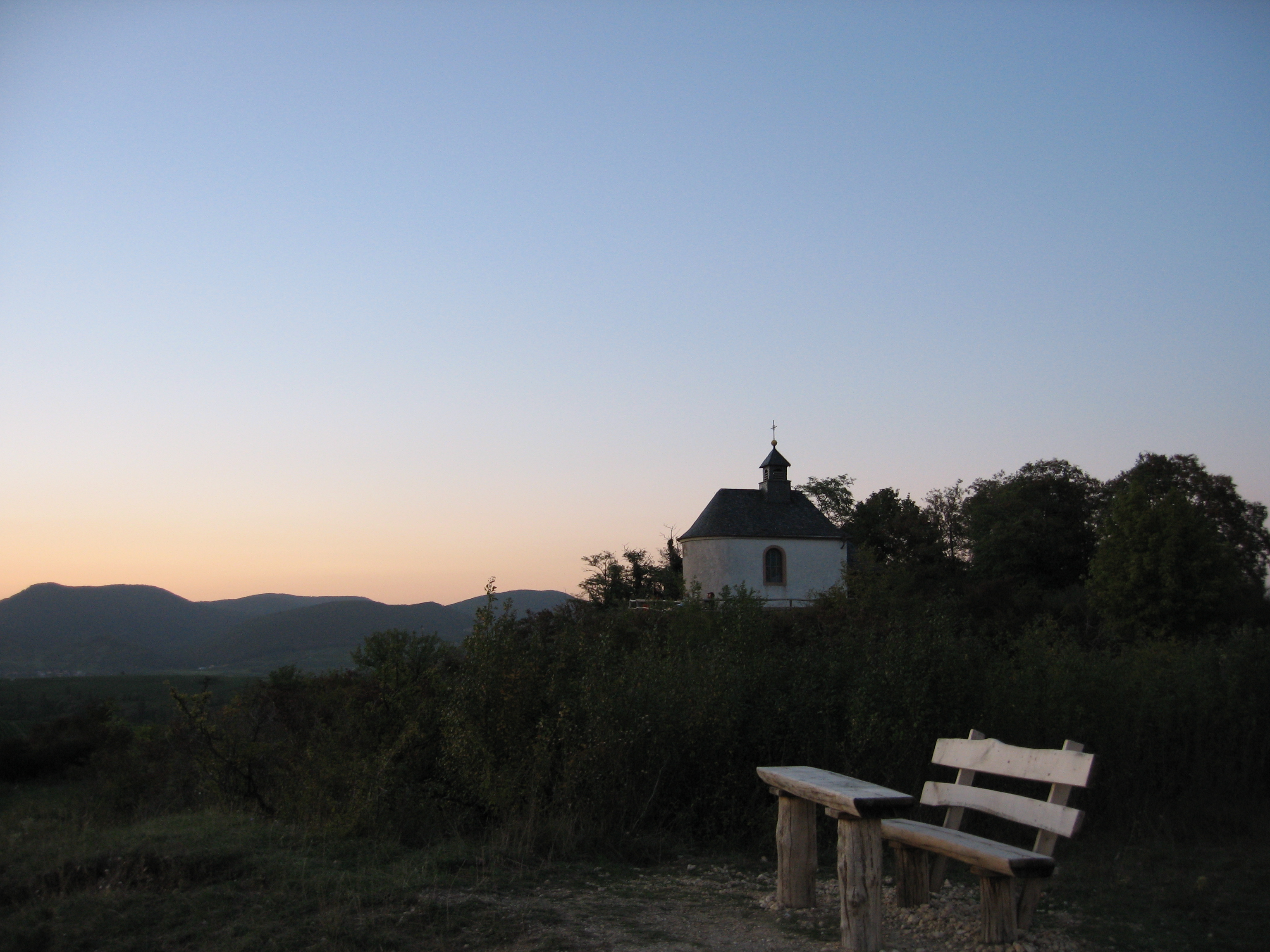
Chapel on the Kleine Kalmit near Arzheim*

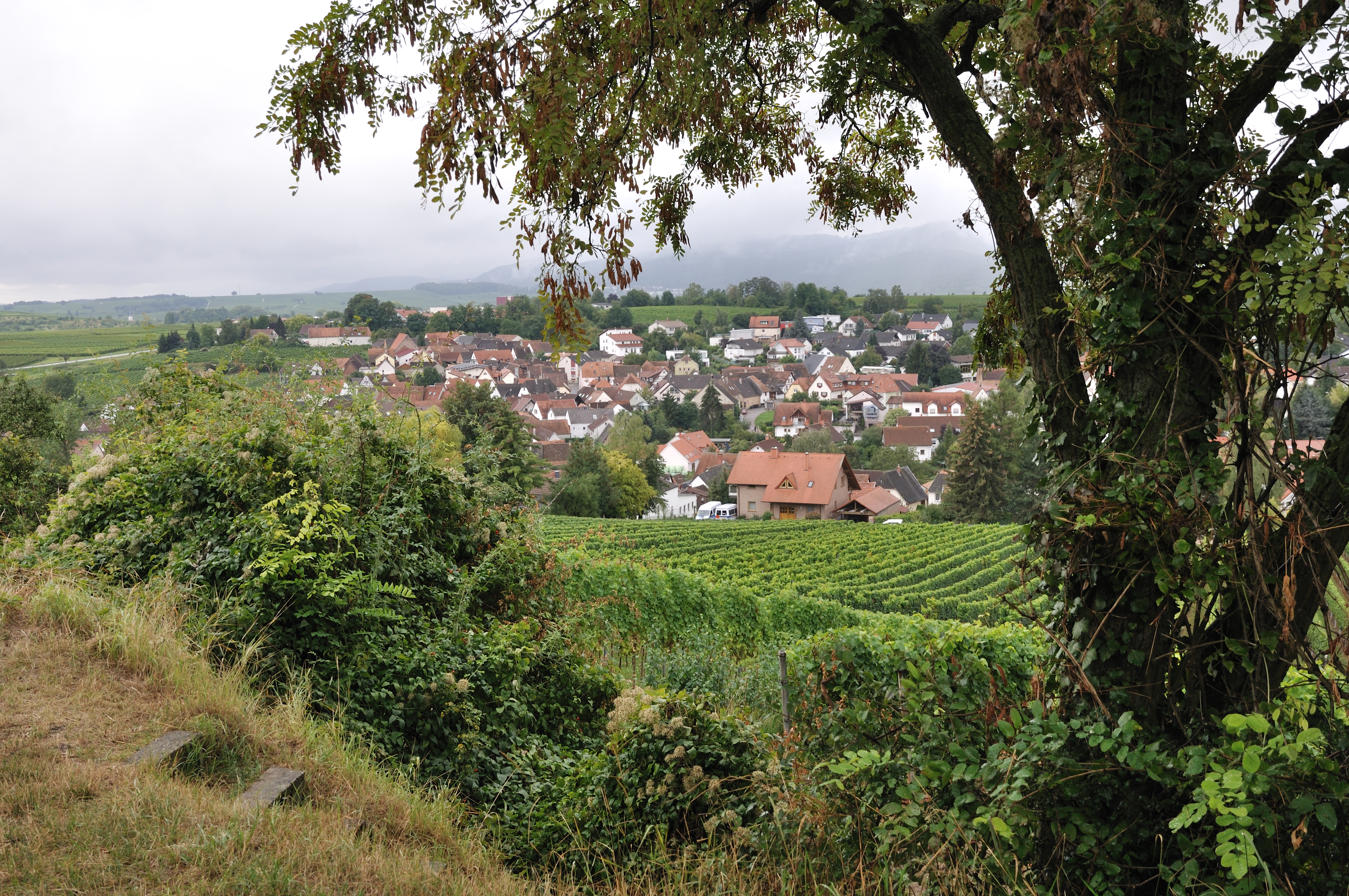
Ilbesheim*

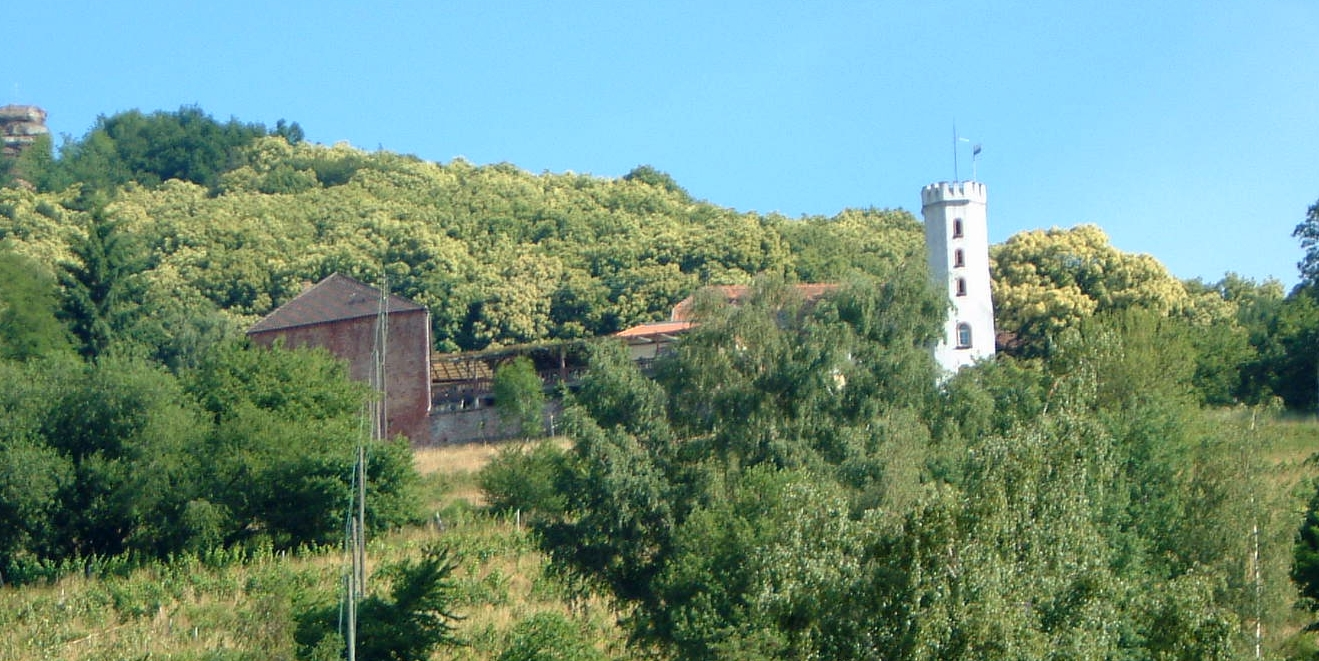
Slevogthof near Leinsweiler*

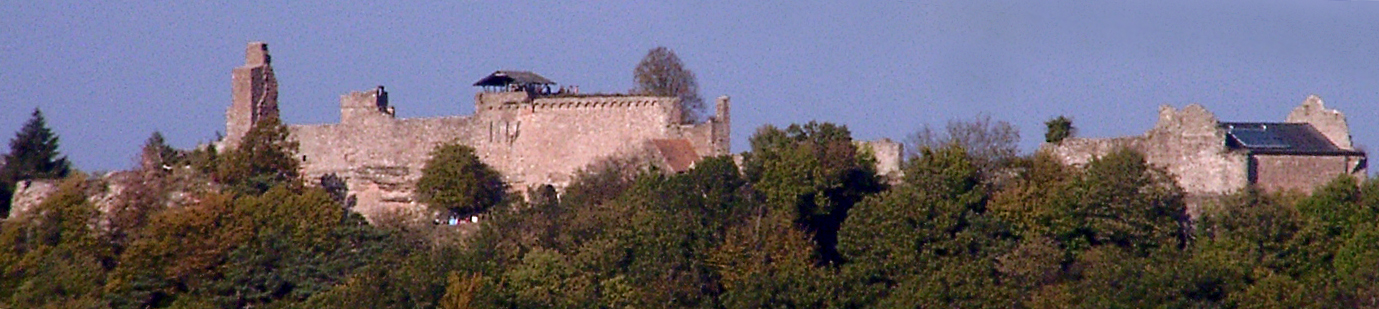
Madenburg near Eschbach*

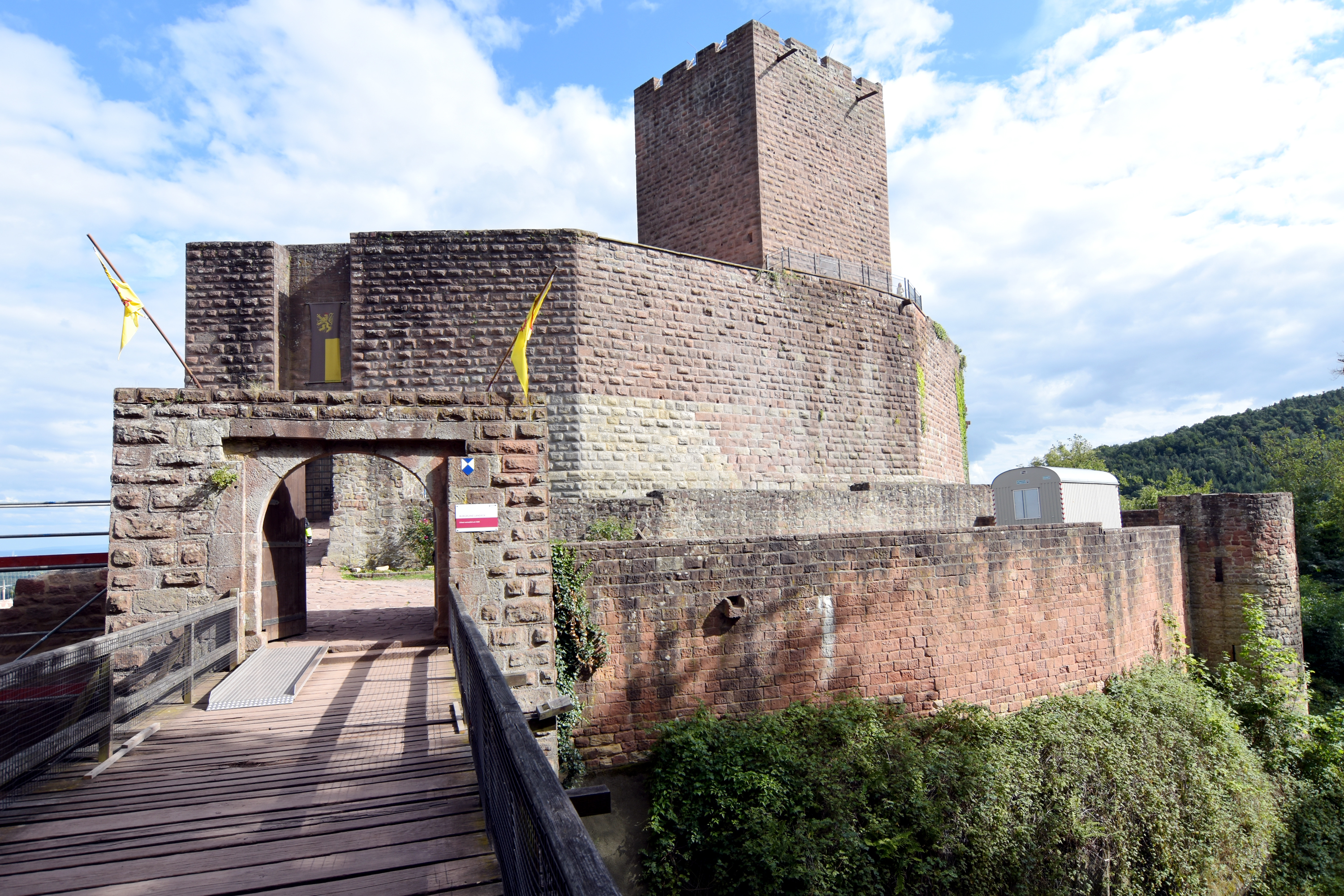
Landeck Castle near Klingenmünster

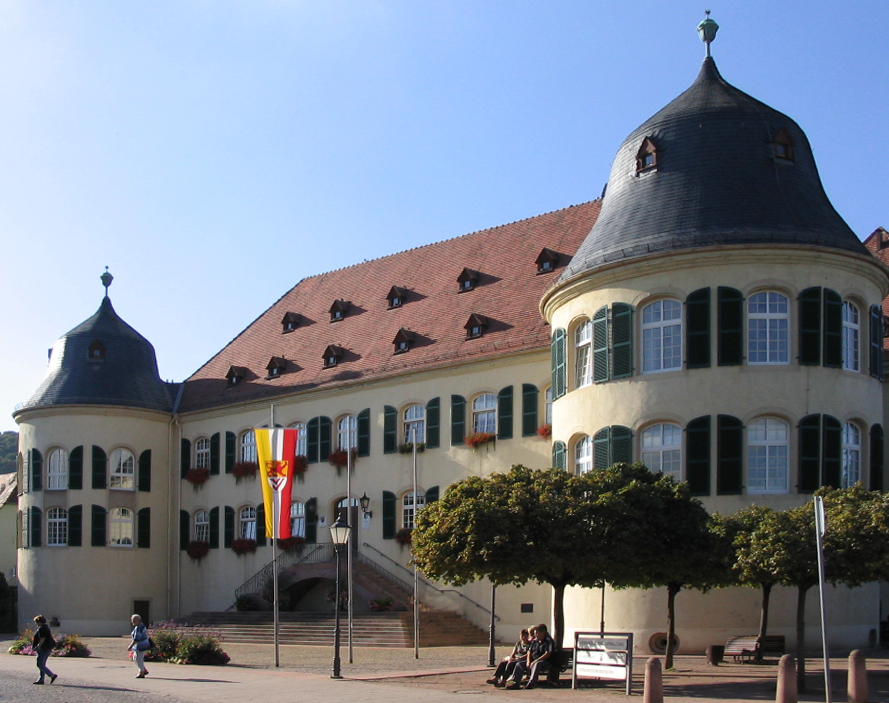
The castle in Bad Bergzabern

Birkenhördt

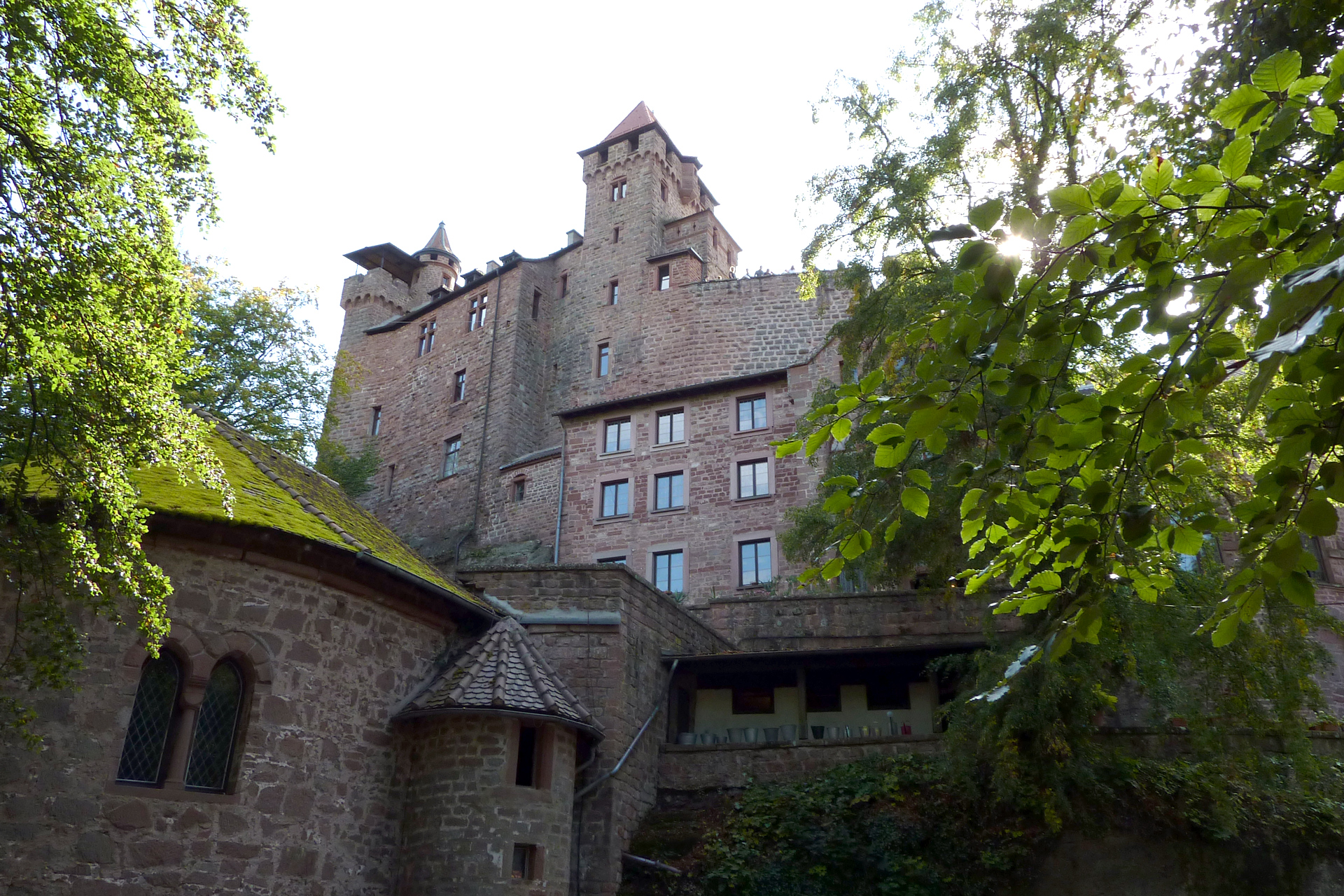
Berwartstein Castle near Erlenbach

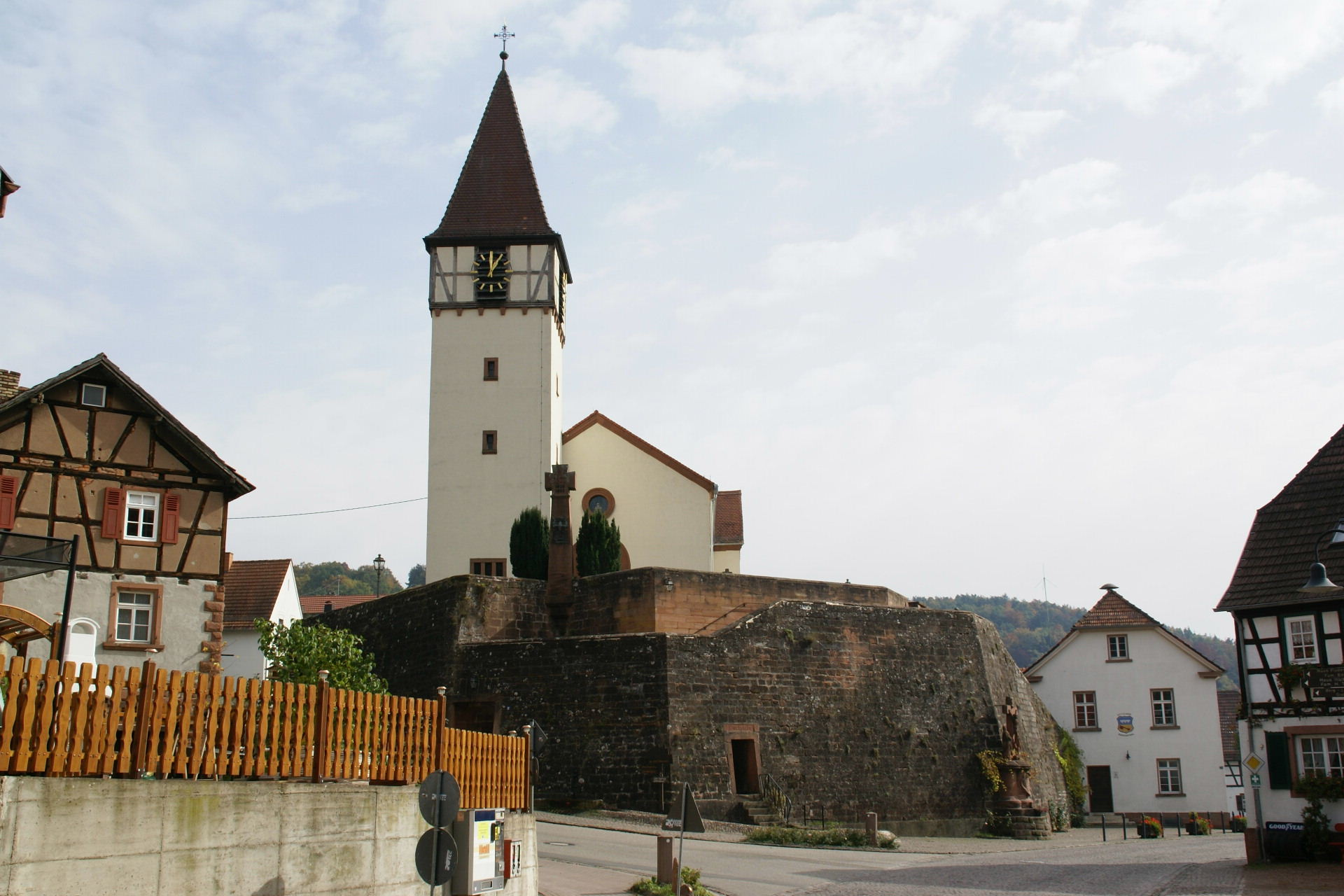
Church in Bundenthal

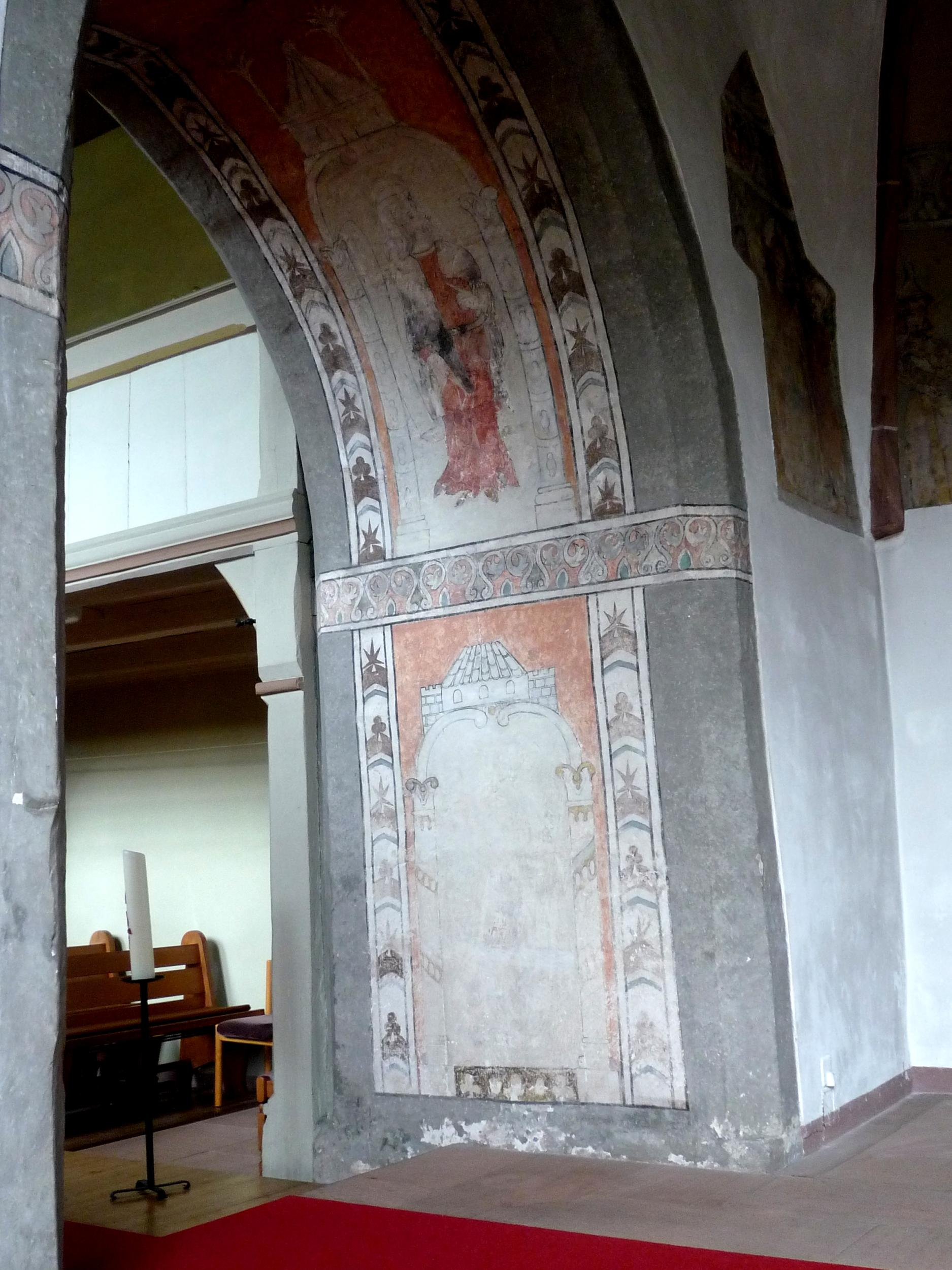
Frescoes in Christ's Church in Rumbach

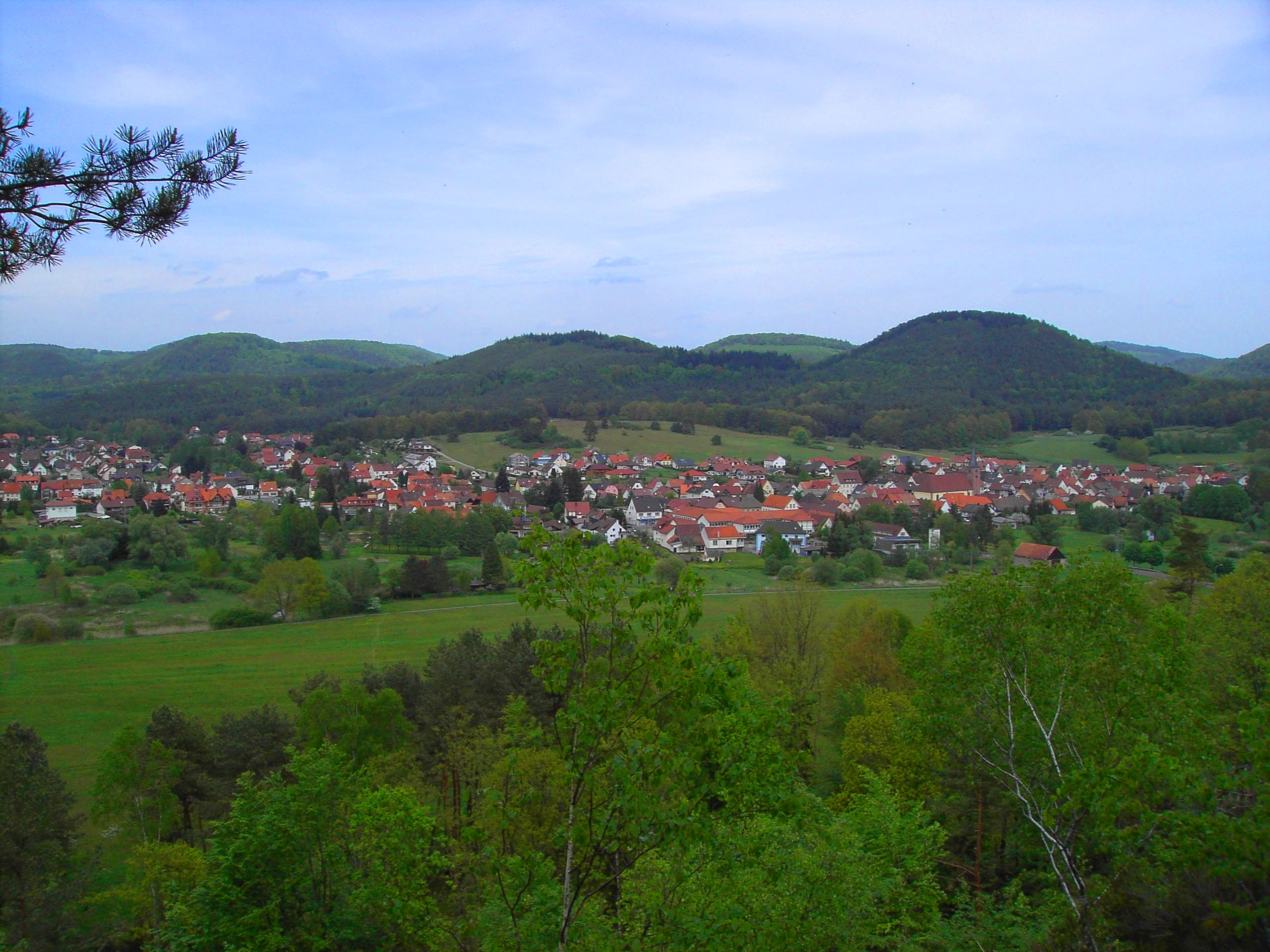
Fischbach

Eppenbrunn

Trulben

Kröppen

Riedelberg

Mauschbach

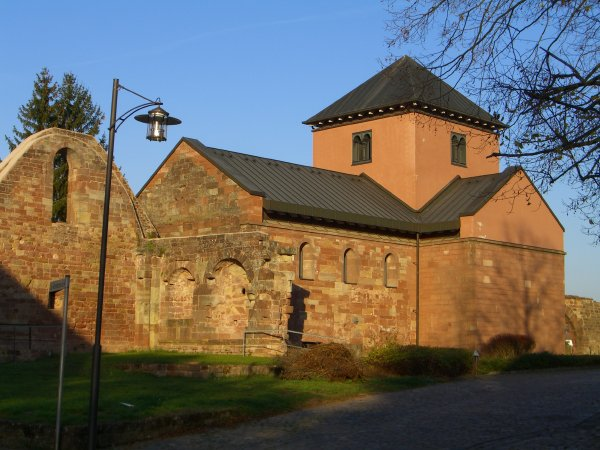
The abbey in Hornbach with St. Pirmin's grave

=== Abbey Route ===
==== Course ====
The Abbey Route (Klosterroute) is so named from the large number of (former) abbeys along its course.

The Way begins at Worms Cathedral and runs westwards to the former pilgrimage village of Zell. It continues to Göllheim, where it branches and runs for about 20 kilometres in two roughly parallel legs. The northernmost runs to the old abbey of Münsterdreisen near Dreisen (Münsterhof); the abbey church of Otterberg is its next destination. From here it continues straight to Landstuhl or via Kaiserslautern. Here the southern branch which runs from Göllheim and past the ruins of Rosenthalerhof Abbey reaches the abbey church in Enkenbach. In Landstuhl the two legs re-unite with the North Route of the Palatine Ways of St. James and run past the pilgrim church in Vogelbach to Homburg. Whilst the North Route now heads for Hornbach, the Abbey Route leaves the Palatinate and joins the Saarland Route in Blieskastel, which runs from Hornbach via Saarbrücken to Metz.

== Literature ==
- Susanne Rieß-Stumm (Red.) (2010), Bistumsarchiv Speyer (ed.), Pfälzer Jakobswege. Auf historischen Wegen von Speyer zum Kloster Hornbach : Wanderführer (in German), Gleiszellen-Gleishorbach: Kuntz Verlag, ISBN 978-3-933507-03-7
- Brigitte Lüger-Ludewig (2005), Rendez-vous am Jakobsweg : Roman (in German), Gleiszellen-Gleishorbach: Kuntz Verlag, ISBN 978-3-933507-06-8
- Kloster-Route Worms–Metz : Wander- & Pilgerführer Pfälzer Jakobswege (in German), Gleiszellen-Gleishorbach: Kuntz Verlag, 2011, ISBN 978-3-933507-14-3
