= Merburg =

- Kirrberg, Saarland, Germany
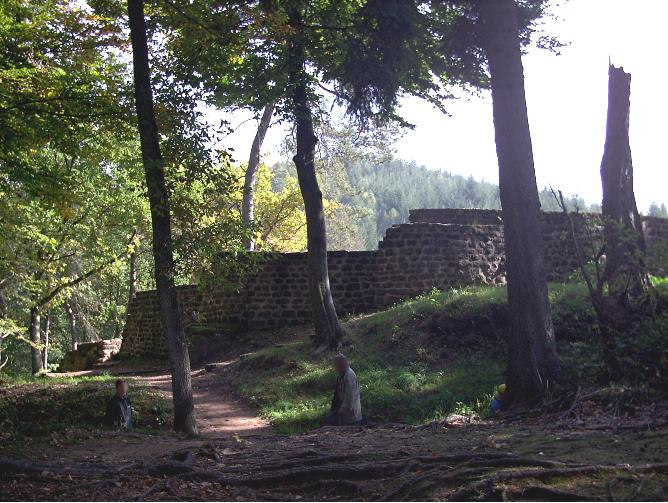
- Ruins of Merburg

Site information
- Code: DE-SL
- Condition: In ruins

Location
- Coordinates: 49.311944°N 7.375556°E
- Height: 245 m above sea level (NN)

Site history
- Built: 12th century

Merburg is a ruined small castle near Homburg, Saarland, Germany. Details about the castle's builders and most of their owners are unknown. Parts of the fortification date to the early 12th century, likely at the location of an older refuge castle from the 10th century. In 1179, a Count Dietrich von Merburg is documented. The castle was probably abandoned in the late 12th century.
