= Lambsborn =

- Municipality
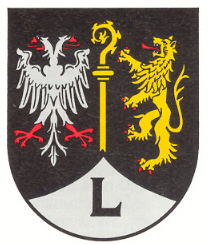
- Coat of arms

- Location of Lambsborn within Kaiserslautern district
- Interactive map of Lambsborn
- Location within Germany Location within Rhineland-Palatinate
- Coordinates: 49°22′01″N 7°25′46″E
- Country: Germany
- State: Rhineland-Palatinate
- District: Kaiserslautern
- Municipal assoc.: Bruchmühlbach-Miesau

Government
  - Mayor (2019–24): Rudi Molter (SPD)

Area
  - Total: 4.73 km^{2} (1.83 sq mi)
- Elevation: 394 m (1,293 ft)

Population (2025-12-31)
  - Total: 709
  - Density: 150/km^{2} (388/sq mi)
- Time zone: UTC+01:00 (CET)
  - Summer (DST): UTC+02:00 (CEST)
- Postal codes: 66894
- Dialling codes: 06372
- Vehicle registration: KL

Lambsborn is a municipality in the district of Kaiserslautern, in Rhineland-Palatinate, western Germany.
