= Hohenburg Castle (Homburg) =

Burgruine Hohenburg
- Homburg, Festung Hohenburg
- Homburg
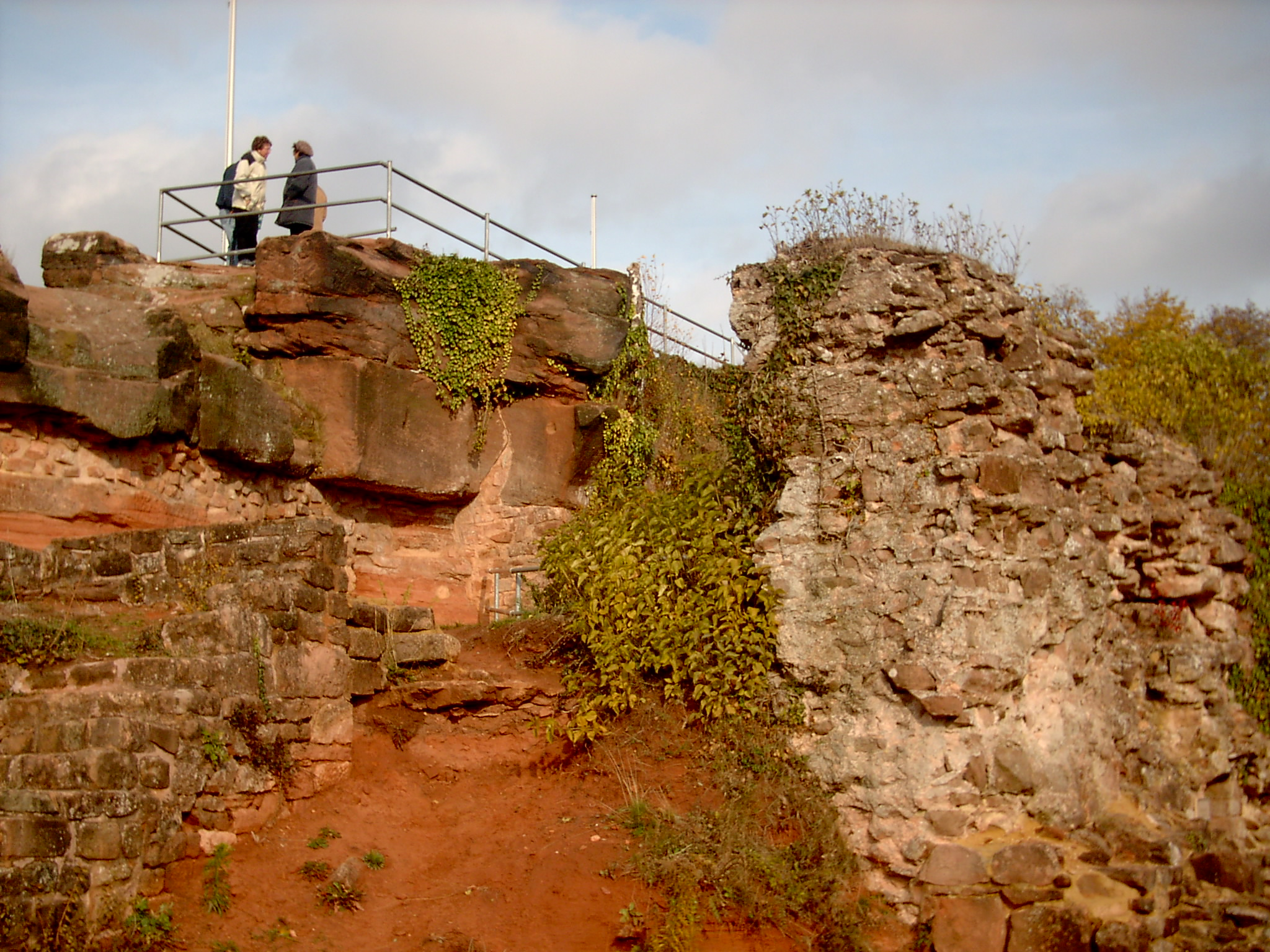
- Ruins of Hohenburg Castle

Site information
- Type: hill castle
- Code: DE-SL
- Condition: Mauerteile, Wall, Graben

Location
- Coordinates: 49°19′15.5″N 7°20′41.4″E
- Height: 306.99 m above sea level (NHN)

Site history
- Built: around 1200

Garrison information
- Occupants: counts

The Hohenburg, also called Homburg Castle or Fortress Hohenburg, is a ruined castle located Homburg in the Saarpfalz district in Saarland, Germany. It stands atop the 325 metres (1,066 ft)-high Schlossberg above the Schlossberg Caves (Schlossberghöhlen).

In the 12th century the castle was the seat of the counts of Homburg. In 1330 the received city rights (Stadtrechte) for their village at the foot of Schlossberg from the Emperor Ludwig the Bavarian. After the death of the last Count of Homburg in 1449 castle and city fell to the counts of Nassau-Saarbrücken. They rebuilt the castle in the second half of the 16th century into a renaissance palace, and then to a fortress.

In the 1600s King Louis XIV of France and his master builder Sébastien Le Prestre de Vauban expanded the fort and fortified the city. The basic structure of Homburg's old town dates back to this time. The fortifications were first demolished in 1697, and finally in 1714 when they served as a quarry for the construction of Karlsberg Castle. From 1981 the ruins were excavated and partially restored.

== Publications ==
- Conrad, Joachim; Flesch, Stefan (1988). Burgen und Schlösser an der Saar. Saarbrücken: Minerva Verlag Thinnes & Nolte. ISBN 978-3477000889.
- Kell, Klaus; Thon, Alexander (2002). "Homburg". Pfälzisches Burgenlexikon vol.2, F–H. Beiträge zur pfälzischen Geschichte. 12 (2). Kaiserslautern: Bezirksverband Pfalz: 423–437. ISBN 3-927754-48-X. ISSN 0936-7640.
- Sander, Eckhart (1999). Die schönsten Schlösser und Burgen im Saarland. Gudensberg: Wartberg. ISBN 978-3861345077.
