= Homburg, Saarland =

Homburg Hombourg (French) Humborch (Palatine German)
- Town
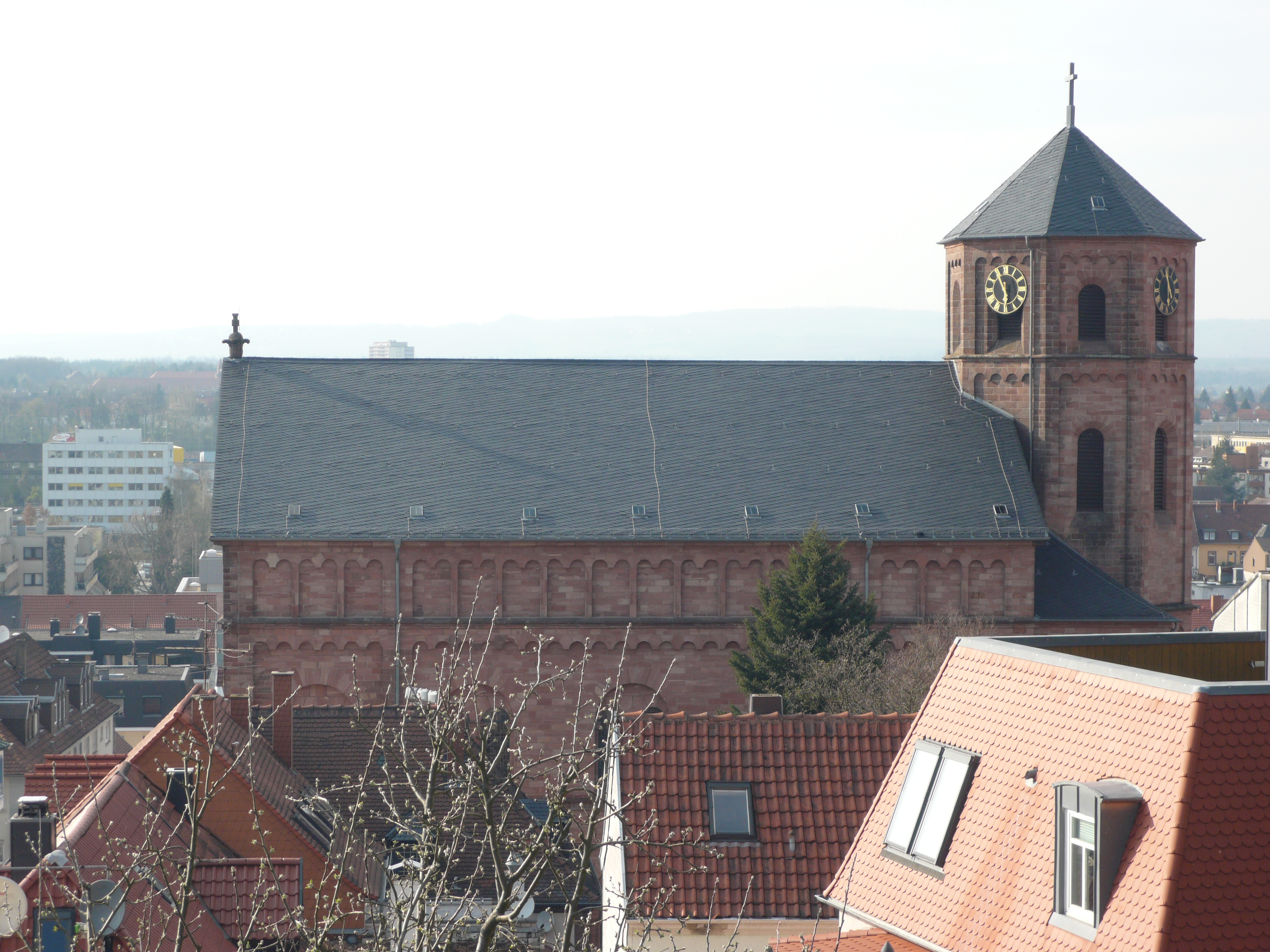
- Saint Michael Church

- Flag Coat of arms

- Location of Homburg within Saarpfalz district
- Interactive map of Homburg
- Location within Germany Location within Saarland
- Coordinates: 49°19′N 7°20′E
- Country: Germany
- State: Saarland
- District: Saarpfalz
- Subdivisions: 9

Government
  - Mayor (2014–24): Rüdiger Schneidewind (SPD)

Area
  - Total: 82.61 km^{2} (31.90 sq mi)
- Elevation: 233 m (764 ft)

Population (2025-12-31)
  - Total: 43,412
  - Density: 525.5/km^{2} (1,361/sq mi)
- Time zone: UTC+01:00 (CET)
  - Summer (DST): UTC+02:00 (CEST)
- Postal codes: 66424 (66401–66424)
- Dialling codes: 06841, 06848 (Einöd and Wörschweiler)
- Vehicle registration: HOM
- Website: Official website

Homburg (German pronunciation: [ˈhɔmbʊʁk]; French: Hombourg [ɔ̃buʁ]; Palatine German: Humborch [ˈhʊmbɔɐ̯ɕ]) is a town in Saarland, Germany and the administrative seat of the Saarpfalz district. With a population of 43,029 inhabitants (2022), it is the third largest town in the state. The city offers over 30,000 workplaces. The medical department of the University of Saarland is situated here. The city is also home to the Karlsberg beer brewery. Major employers include Robert Bosch GmbH, Schaeffler Group and Michelin.

== Geography ==
Homburg is located in the northern part of the Saarpfalz district, bordering Rhineland-Palatinate. It is 16 km from Neunkirchen and 36 km from Saarbrücken.

The city districts are situated in the Blies valley or on its tributaries Erbach, Lambsbach and Schwarzbach.

Homburg is composed of Homburg center and nine city districts: Beeden, Bruchhof-Sanddorf, Einöd, Erbach, Jägersburg, Kirrberg, Reiskirchen, Schwarzenbach and Wörschweiler.

Einöd includes: Einöd, Ingweiler and Schwarzenacker; Jägersburg includes Jägersburg, Altbreitenfelderhof and Websweiler; Erbach includes Erbach, Lappentascherhof and Johannishof.

== Demographics ==
Historical population
Year	Pop.	±% p.a.
1814	2,900	—
1876	3,600	+0.35%
1905	9,400	+3.36%
1938	20,100	+2.33%
1945	19,600	−0.36%
1973	33,600	+1.94%
1974	43,100	+28.27%
2000	46,000	+0.25%
2014	43,000	−0.48%
2022	43,029	+0.01%
Source: Homburg

Actual (as of 1 August 2022):

Village	District	Population
Altbreitenfelderhof	Jägersburg	120
Beeden	Homburg Center	2,714
Bruchhof	Homburg Center	1,818
Einöd	Einöd	2,749
Erbach	Homburg Center	12,352
Homburg	Homburg Center	12,058
Ingweiler	Einöd	158
Jägersburg	Jägersburg	2,755
Kirrberg	Kirrberg	2,566
Lappentascher Hof	Homburg Center	191
Reiskirchen	Homburg Center	1,296
Sanddorf	Homburg Center	1,170
Schwarzenacker	Einöd	632
Schwarzenbach	Homburg Center	1,925
Websweiler	Jägersburg	263
Wörschweiler	Wörschweiler	262
Total		43,029

== History ==
Historical affiliations

County of Homburg 12th century–1449
County of Nassau-Saarbrücken 1449–1680
Kingdom of France 1680–1697
County of Nassau-Saarbrücken 1697–1755
Palatine Zweibrücken 1755–1793
French Republic 1793–1804
French Empire 1804–1815
Kingdom of Bavaria 1816–1871
German Empire 1871–1918
Territory of the Saar Basin 1920–1935
Nazi Germany 1935–1945
Saar Protectorate 1947–1956
West Germany 1957–1990
Germany 1990–present

Hohenburg Castle, nowadays a ruin, was the seat of the counts of Homburg in the 12th century. In 1330 the village received town status (Stadtrecht) from Louis the Bavarian.

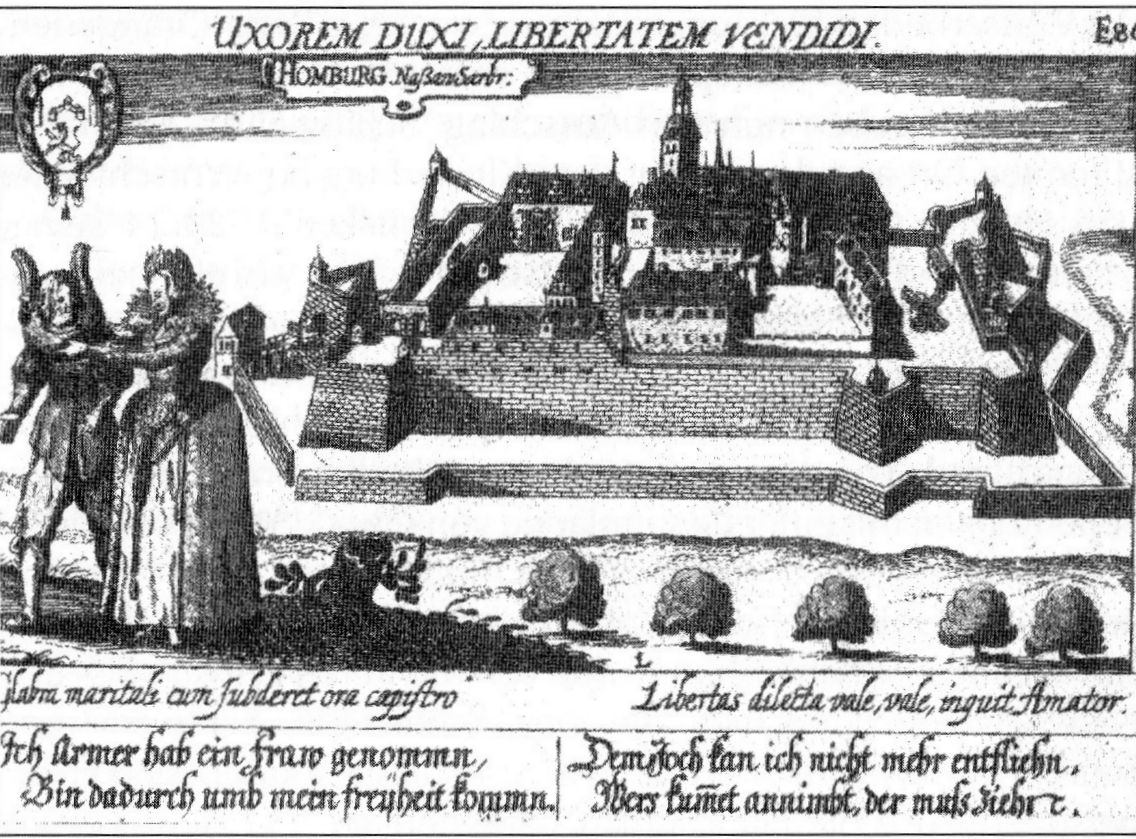
Homburg in the 17th century

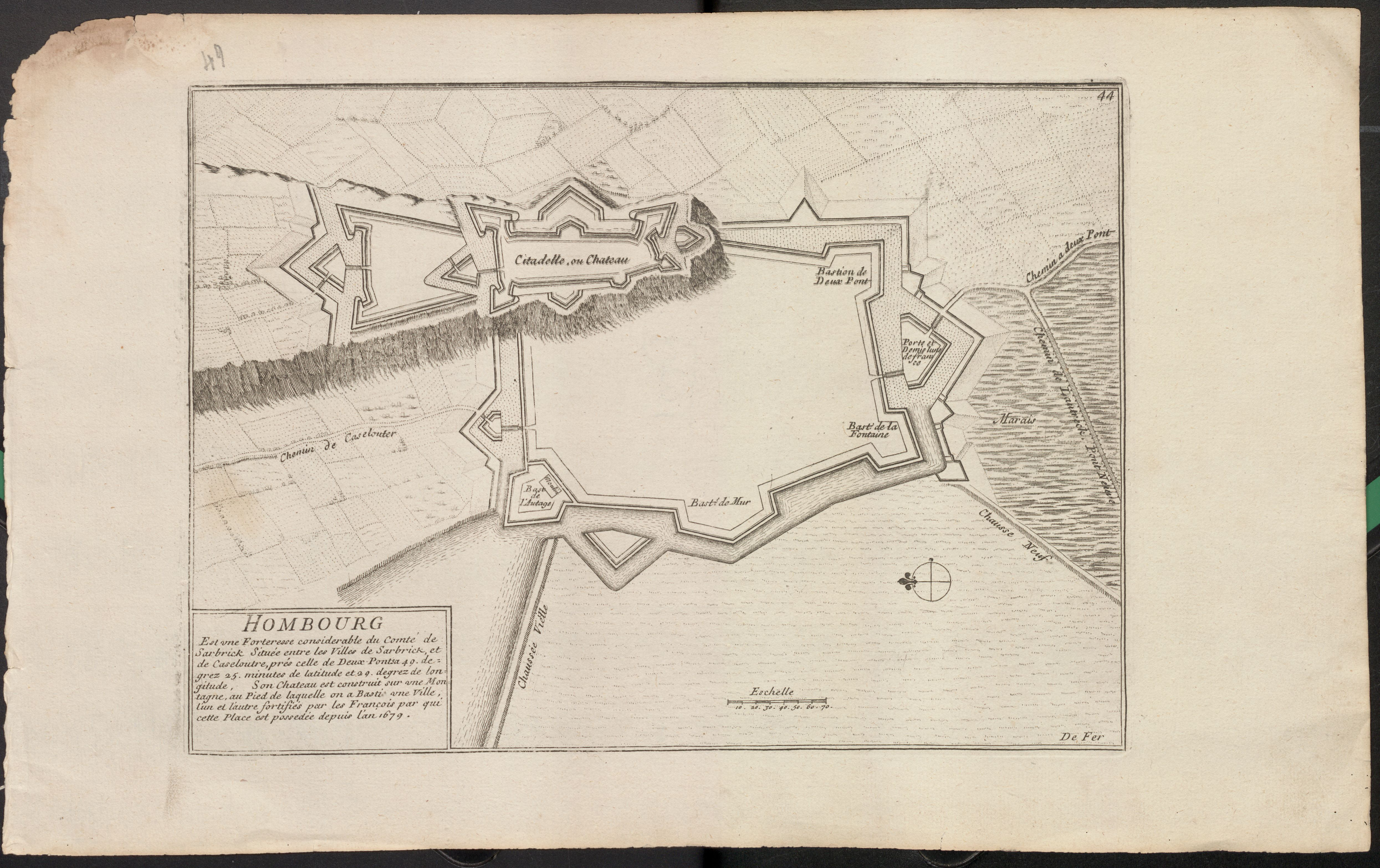
Fortress of Homburg in 1700

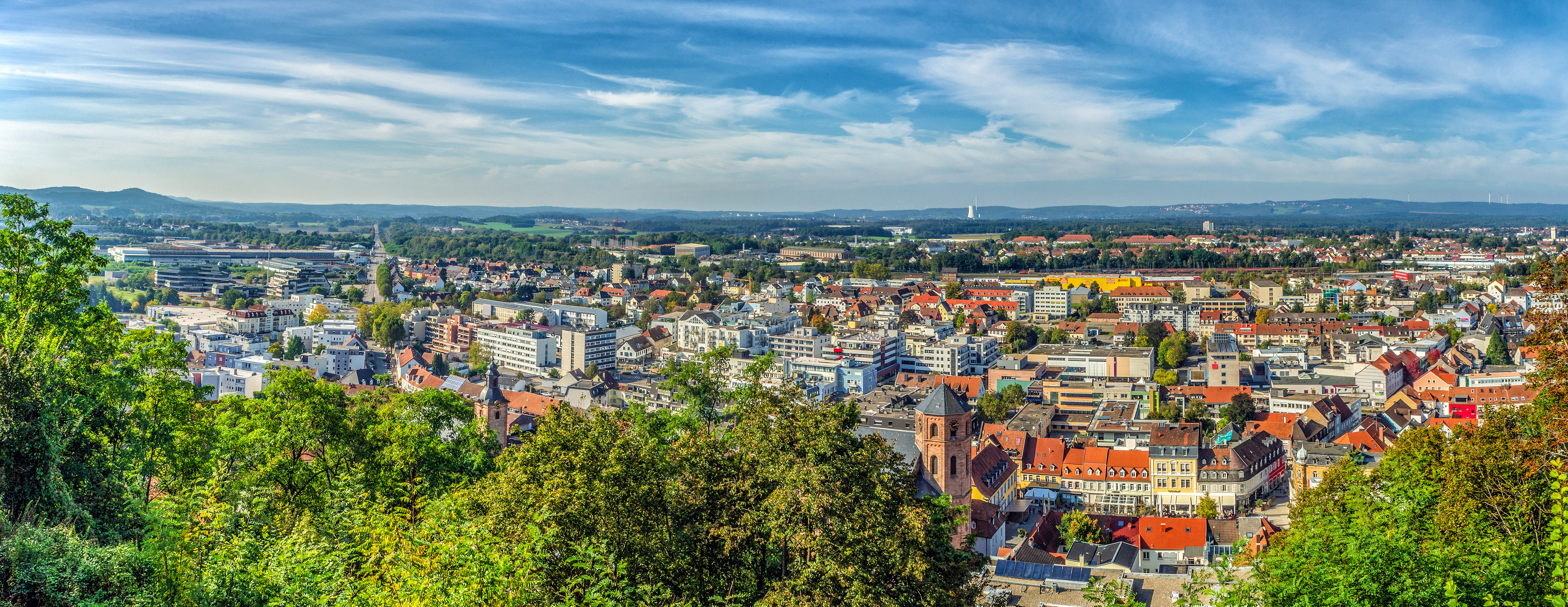
The city from Schlossberg

== Politics ==
Since the administration reform 1974 Homburg has a Lord Mayor, before that it used to have a Mayor.

Rüdiger Schneidewind (SPD) has been Lord Mayor of Homburg since October 1, 2014.

== Main sights ==
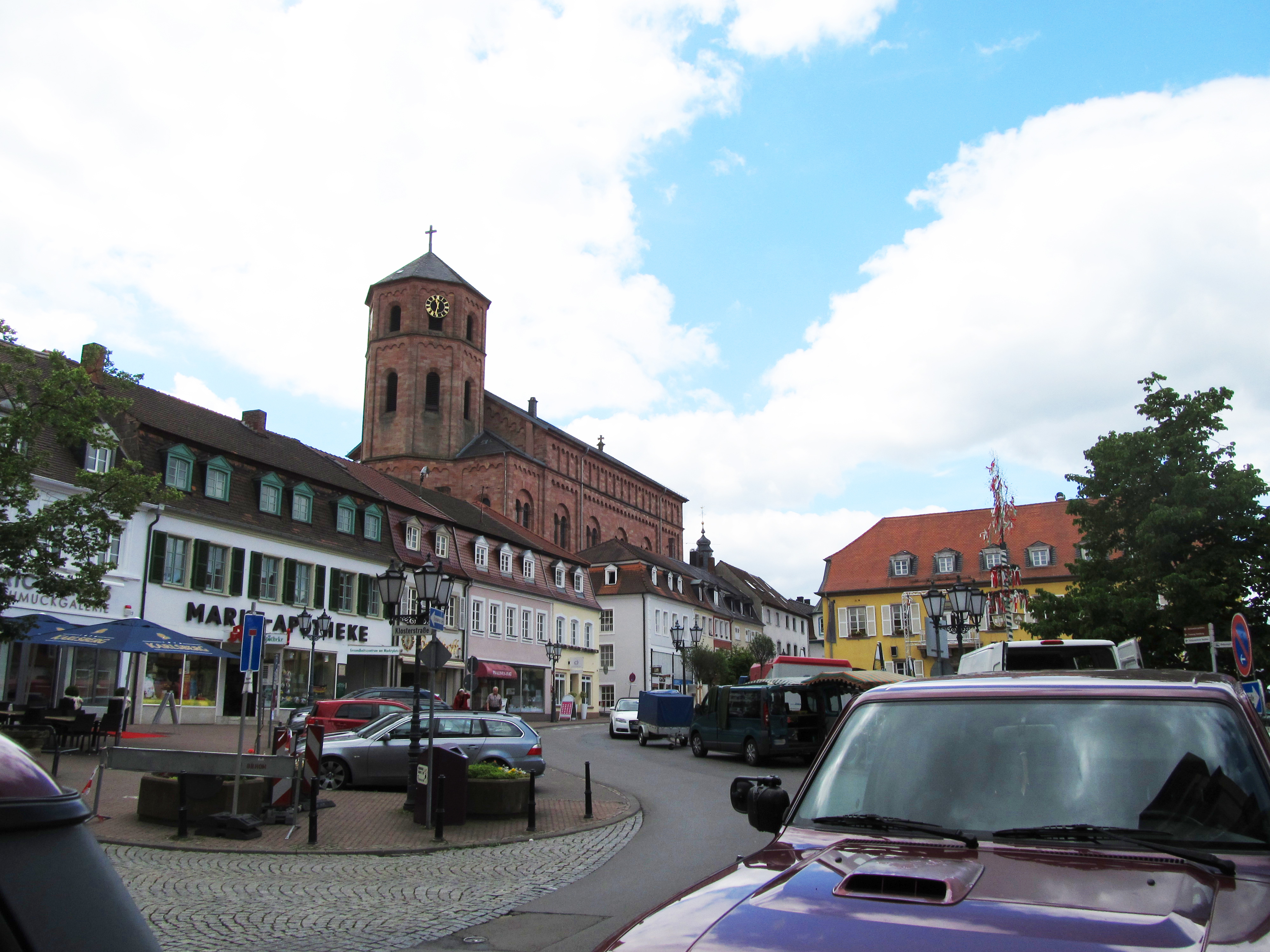
Market square

- Schlossberg Caves
- Louisenthal Castle
- Karlsberg Castle
- Wörschweiler Abbey

== Transport ==
Homburg (Saar) Hauptbahnhof is the main railway station in the town, served by long-distance and regional trains. By road transport, the town is served by the motorways A6 (exit Homburg) and A8 (exits Limbach and Einöd).

== Notable people ==
- Ernst Ludwig Leyser (1896–1973), Nazi Party official
- Horst Ehrmantraut (born 1955), footballer
- Stefan Eck (born 1956), politician (former Tierschutzpartei, currently independent)
- Andreas Walzer (born 1970), cyclist
- Michael Jakosits (born 1970), sports shooter
- Markus Heitz (born 1971), fantasy author
- Timo Bernhard (born 1981), sports car racer
- Tarek Ehlail (1981–2025), filmmaker
- David Bardens (born 1984), physician
- Laura Steinbach (born 1985), handball player
- Kelly Piquet (born 1988), Brazilian blogger and model
- Carl David Maria Weber (1814–1881), early settler in California, and founder of the city of Stockton, California

== Twin towns – sister cities ==
Homburg is twinned with:

- La Baule-Escoublac, France (1984)
- Ilmenau, Germany (1989)
- Albano Laziale, Italy (2018)
