= Kirrberg (Saar) =

- Stadtteil of Homburg
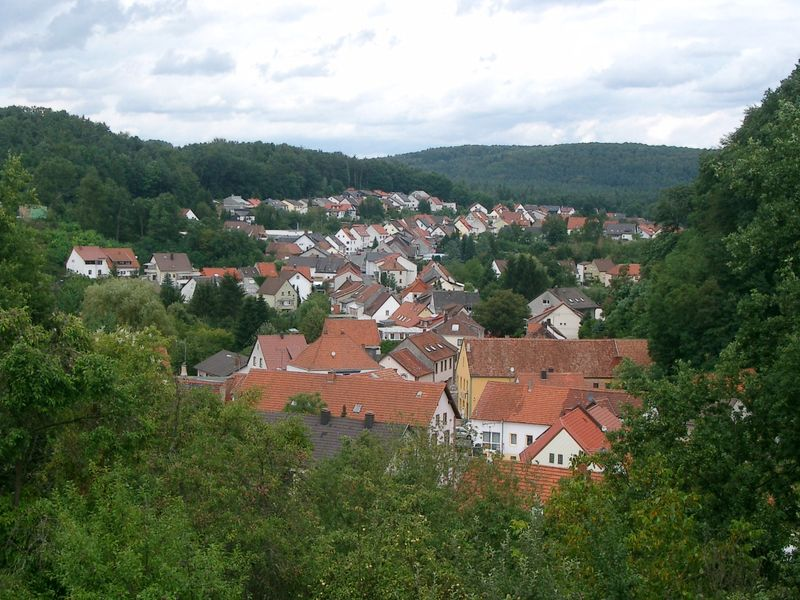
- View of Kirrberg

- Coat of arms
- Interactive map of Kirrberg
- Location within Germany Location within Saarland
- Coordinates: 49°18′1″N 7°22′10″E
- Country: Germany
- State: Saarland
- District: Saarpfalz
- Municipality: Homburg

Population (2021)
  - Total: 2,607
- Time zone: UTC+01:00 (CET)
  - Summer (DST): UTC+02:00 (CEST)
- Postal codes: 66424
- Dialling codes: 06841
- Vehicle registration: HOM
- Website: Official website

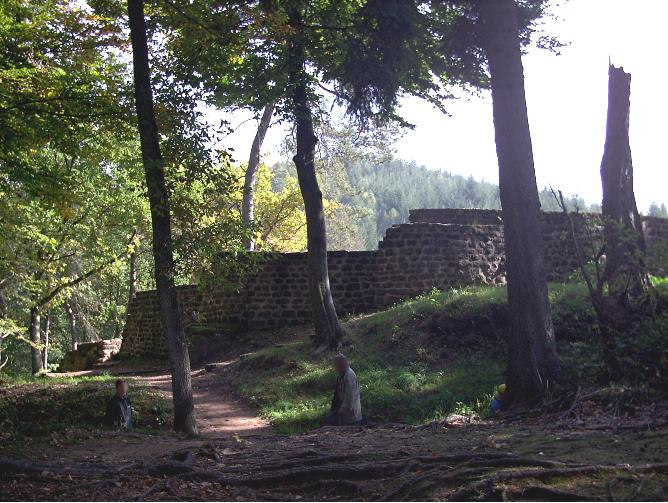
Ruins of the Merburg

Kirrberg (in dialect Kerrbrich) is a district of Homburg, situated in the eastern part of the Saarpfalz (Saar-Palatinate) district and the Saarland bordering state Rhineland-Palatinate. Until End 1973 was Kirrberg an independent municipality in the former Homburg district. Homburg (5 km), Zweibrücken (7 km), Saarbrücken and Kaiserslautern (both 35 km) are the closest towns. As of 1 August 2021, 2,607 inhabitants live in Kirrberg.

The river Lambsbach runs through the district from east to west.

== History ==
The chapel of Kirrberg was first mentioned in the year 1290 as "Capella in Kirchperch". On 23 April 1949 Kirrberg was affiliated with the Bundesland Saarland and because of that it is the youngest village of the Bundesland.
