= House of Sickingen =

Nobel house of the Holy Roman Empire

Sickingen Von Sickingen
- Noble family
- Coat of arms of the Counts of Sickingen
- Place of origin: Kraichgau, Palatinate, Holy Roman Empire
- Founded: 1280s (1289)
- Founder: Ludewicus de Sickingen
- Estates: Burg Ebernburg; Burg Nanstein
- Dissolution: May 31, 1932
- Cadet branches: Sickingen-Hohenburgs; Sickingen-Sickingen

The House of Sickingen is an old southwest German noble family. The lords of Sickingen belonged to the Kraichgau nobility and from 1797 to the Imperial nobility. Significant relatives emerged from the family, who achieved great influence in both spiritual and secular offices. Reinhard von Sickingen was Prince-Bishop of Worms from 1445 to 1482 and Kasimir Anton von Sickingen was Prince-Bishop of Constance from 1743 to 1750. Imperial Knight Franz von Sickingen (1481-1523) was a leader of the Rhenish and Swabian knighthood.

The Sickingen-Sickingen line of the family died out in 1834, and the Sickingen-Hohenburgs in 1932.

== Lordship of Landstuhl ==
The Lordship of Landstuhl was a knightly territory of the Holy Roman Empire of the German Nation in today's Rhineland-Palatinate. Feuded by the Lords of Sickingen from the 16th to the 18th century, it fell to France along with the left bank of the Rhine in 1801 and became part of the Kingdom of Bavaria in 1816. The lordship was divided into the "Great Jurisdiction" (Großgericht) and the "Little Jurisdiction" (Kleingericht). Within the Großgericht were the villages of Bann, Harsberg, Hermersberg, Horbach, Kindsbach, Krickenbach, Linden, Queidersbach, Weselberg and Zeselberg. The Kleingericht oversaw the villages of Gerhardsbrunn, Hauptstuhl, Kirchenarnbach, Knopp, Langwieden, Martinshöhe, Mittelbrunn, Mühlbach, Oberarnbach, Obernheim, Scharrhof and Schauerberg,

== Members ==
- Schwickart der Jüngere von Sickingen (died 1478), Amtmann
- Schweickhardt von Sickingen (died 1505), imperial knight, father of Franz von Sickingen
- Reinhard von Sickingen (born around 1417; died 1482), Prince-Bishop of Worms, held office from 1445 to 1482
- Franz von Sickingen (born 1481; died 1523), imperial knight and leader of the Rhenish and Swabian knights
- Johann Damian von Sickingen (18th century), Inhaber of an imperial infantry regiment
- Ferdinand Damian von Sickingen, Commander of the German Order of St. Aegidius, (1734-1736)
- Karl Heinrich Joseph von Sickingen (born 1737; died 1791), diplomat and chemist
- Karl Schweikard von Sickingen (died 1711), Knight of the Teutonic Order
- Kasimir Anton von Sickingen (born 1684; died 1750), Prince-Bishop of Constance, held office from 1743 to 1750
- Karl Ludwig von Sickingen-Ebernburg, Abbot of Kornelimünster Abbey 1745–1764
- Franz von Sickingen (died 1834 in Sauerthal), imperial count and castle lord of the Sauerburg. Last member of the noble family

== Variant arms ==
Colours and elements from the Sickingen coat of arms still appear today in many county, town and village coats of arms in the former territory of the Sickingens.

District of Kaiserslautern

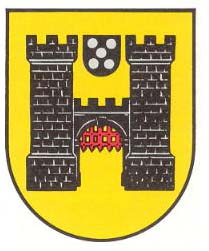
Town of Landstuhl, district of Kaiserslautern

Municipal Association of Landstuhl, district of Kaiserslautern

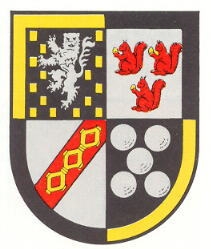
Municipal Association of Otterberg, district of Kaiserslautern

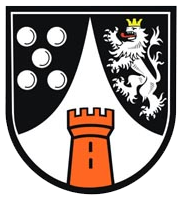
Town of Bad Münster am Stein-Ebernburg, district of Bad Kreuznach

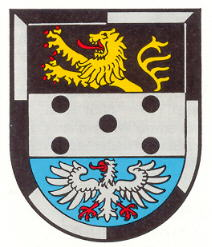
Municipal Association of Wallhalben, district of Südwestpfalz

Municipal Association of Waldfischbach-Burgalben, district of Südwestpfalz

Municipality of Sauerthal, district of Rhein-Lahn-Kreis

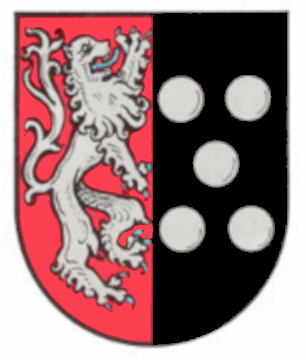
Municipality of Bann, district of Kaiserslautern

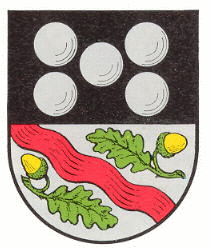
Municipality of Hauptstuhl, district of Kaiserslautern

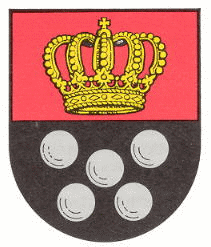
Municipality of Kindsbach, district of Kaiserslautern
