= Landstuhl (Verbandsgemeinde) =

Municipal association in Rhineland-Palatinate, Germany

- Verbandsgemeinde
- Coat of arms

- Location of Landstuhl within Kaiserslautern district
- Interactive map of Landstuhl
- Location within Germany Location within Rhineland-Palatinate
- Coordinates: 49°24′44″N 7°34′20″E
- Country: Germany
- State: Rhineland-Palatinate
- District: Kaiserslautern
- Seat: Landstuhl
- Subdivisions: 12 municipalities

Area
  - Total: 59.57 km^{2} (23.00 sq mi)

Population (2025-12-31)
  - Total: 26,071
  - Density: 437.7/km^{2} (1,134/sq mi)
- Time zone: UTC+01:00 (CET)
  - Summer (DST): UTC+02:00 (CEST)
- Vehicle registration: KL
- Website: www.landstuhl.de

The Verbandsgemeinde Landstuhl is a municipal association (German: Verbandsgemeinde) in the district of Kaiserslautern, in Rhineland-Palatinate, Germany. The seat of the municipal association is the town Landstuhl.

It contains the following 12 Palatinate municipalities: Bann, Hauptstuhl, Kindsbach, Krickenbach, Landstuhl, Linden, Mittelbrunn, Oberarnbach, Queidersbach, Schopp, Stelzenberg, and Trippstadt.

== History ==
The Municipal Association of Landstuhl was formed on 1 September 1971 from a combination of the municipalities of Bann, Hauptstuhl, Kindsbach, Landstuhl, Mittelbrunn, and Oberarnbach. On 1 July 2019, it was expanded to include the six municipalities of the former Verbandsgemeinde Kaiserslautern-Süd.
