= Kaiserslautern-Süd =

Former municipality in Rhineland-Palatinate

Coordinates: 49°26′41″N 7°46′08″E

Kaiserslautern-Süd is a former Verbandsgemeinde ("collective municipality") in the district of Kaiserslautern, in Rhineland-Palatinate, Germany. On 1 July 2019 it was merged into the Verbandsgemeinde Landstuhl. It was situated in the Palatinate Forest, approx. 10 km south of Kaiserslautern, which was the seat of the municipality, but not part of it.

The Verbandsgemeinde Kaiserslautern-Süd consisted of the following Ortsgemeinden ("local municipalities"):

1. Krickenbach
2. Linden
3. Queidersbach
4. Schopp
5. Stelzenberg
6. Trippstadt
