= Queidersbach =

- Municipality
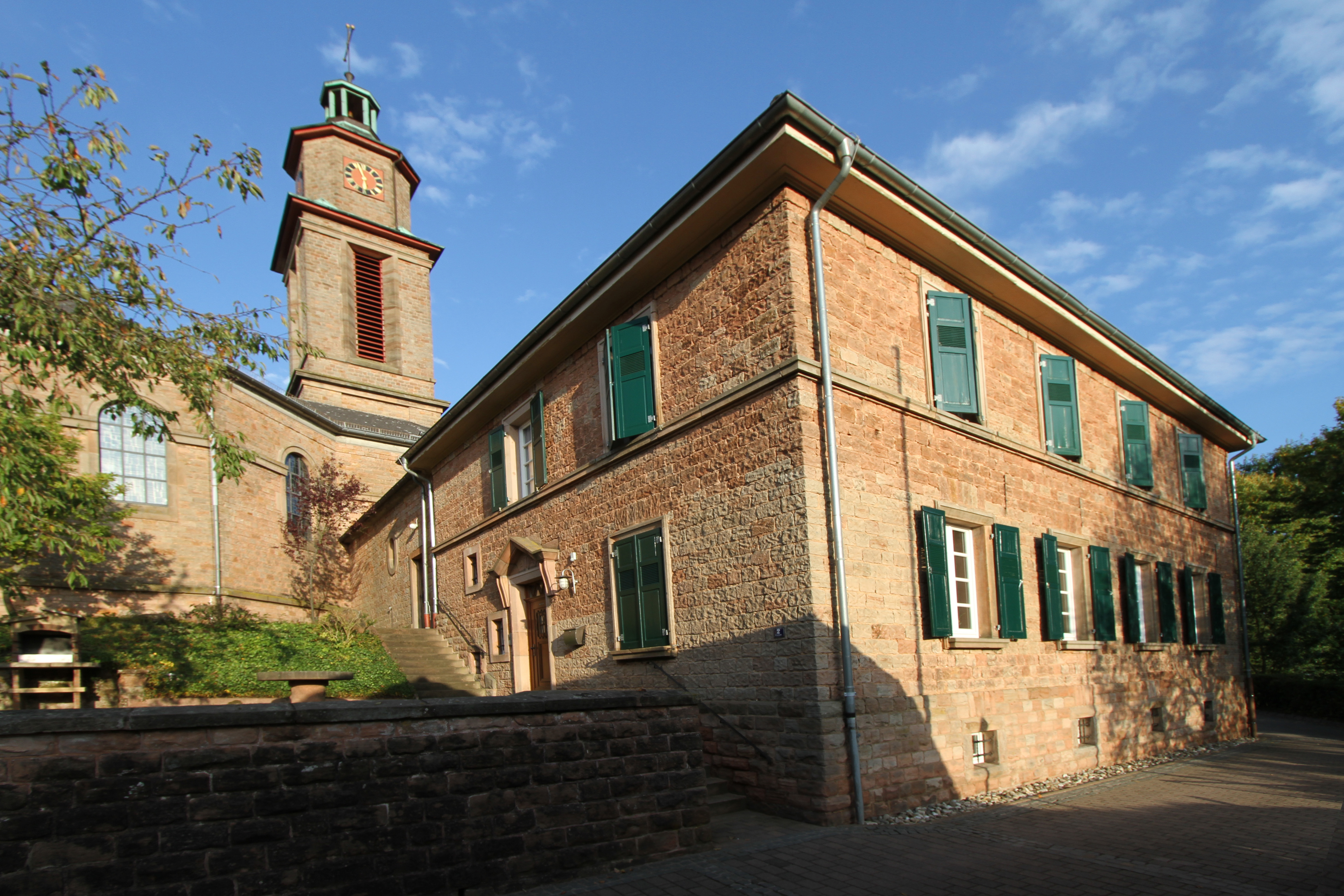
- Church of Saint Anthony with the rectory

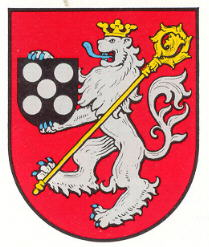
- Coat of arms

- Location of Queidersbach within Kaiserslautern district
- Interactive map of Queidersbach
- Location within Germany Location within Rhineland-Palatinate
- Coordinates: 49°22′28″N 7°38′07″E
- Country: Germany
- State: Rhineland-Palatinate
- District: Kaiserslautern

Government
  - Mayor (2019–24): Ralph Simbgen (CDU)

Area
  - Total: 14.79 km^{2} (5.71 sq mi)
- Elevation: 321 m (1,053 ft)

Population (2025-12-31)
  - Total: 2,715
  - Density: 183.6/km^{2} (475.4/sq mi)
- Time zone: UTC+01:00 (CET)
  - Summer (DST): UTC+02:00 (CEST)
- Postal codes: 66851
- Dialling codes: 06371
- Vehicle registration: KL
- Website: www.queidersbach-pfalz.de

Queidersbach (German pronunciation: [ˈkvaɪdɐsbax]) is a municipality in the district of Kaiserslautern, in Rhineland-Palatinate, western Germany.

== Geography ==
The municipality is located 10 km southwest of Kaiserslautern in a natural meadow valley on the western edge of the Palatinate Forest, which merges in this area into the Sickingen Heights. Almost two-thirds of the 1500 hectare district is covered with forest. Queidersbach includes the areas Forsthaus Stempelberg, Schweinstal and Zuckerhof.

Through Queidersbach flows the eponymous creek, which is popularly referred to as Steinalb. The neighbouring communities are Bann, Kaiserslautern, Krickenbach, Linden, Weselberg and Obernheim-Kirchenarnbach.

== History ==
The community was first documented in 976 when Emperor Otto II gave his vassal Biso, the Bishop of Paderborn, land on the Queidersbach.

The village Queidersbach, until the end of the 18th century, belonged to the Grand Court of the Rule Landstuhl, which was ruled by the barons of Sickingen-Hohenburg. In 1794, the left bank of the Rhine was occupied in the First Coalition War.

From 1798 to 1814, when the Palatinate was part of the French Republic and then part of the Napoleonic Empire, Queidersbach was incorporated into the canton of Landstuhl in the department of Donnersberg. At the time, it was the seat of a Mairie which also included Linden. Due to the agreements made at the Congress of Vienna, the area first came to Austria in June 1815 and was ceded to the Kingdom of Bavaria in 1816 on the basis of the Treaty of Munich. Under Bavarian administration, Queidersbach belonged to the Landeskommissariat Homburg in the Rhine district. This was converted into a district office in 1862.

From 1929 to 1939, Queidersbach belonged to the district office of Kaiserslautern. Since 1939, the community has been a part of the district of Kaiserslautern. After the Second World War, Trippstadt was within the French occupation zone of the then newly formed state of Rhineland-Palatinate and the administrative district of Pfalz. In 1972 Queidersbach was incorporated into the newly created collective municipality of Kaiserslautern-Süd during the first Rhineland-Palatinate administrative reform. This municipality subsequently merged with Landstuhl in July 2019.
