= Marcel Cordes =

German opera singer

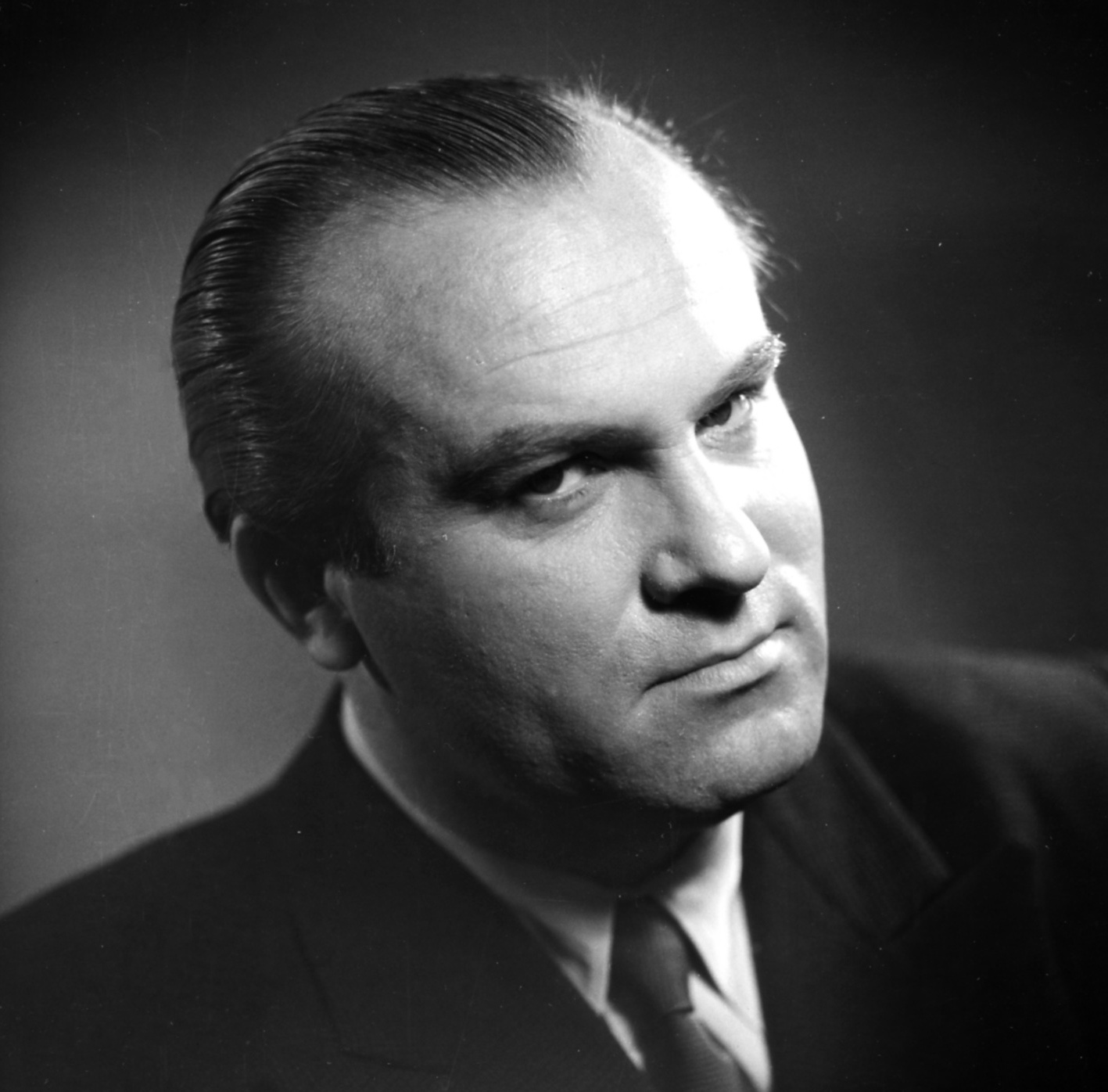
- Marcel Cordes, c. 1960
- Born: Kurt Schumacher; 11 March 1920; Stelzenberg, Germany
- Died: 26 November 1992 (aged 72); Angerberg, Austria
- Education: Musikhochschule Mannheim
- Occupation: Operatic baritone
- Organizations: Mannheim National Theatre; Badisches Staatstheater Karlsruhe

Marcel Cordes (born Kurt Schumacher, 11 March 1920 – 26 November 1992) was a German baritone in opera and concert. He was regarded as a leading baritone of German origin for Italian opera in the 1950s and 1960s. He appeared at major opera houses in Europe, and made recordings of complete operas and excerpts, including in 1956 the first complete recording of Carl Orff's Die Kluge.

== Career ==
Born Kurt Schumacher in Stelzenberg, he studied at the conservatory in Kaiserslautern from age 16, three years later on a scholarship at the Musikhochschule Mannheim. He made his operatic debut as a tenor at the municipal theatre of Eger in 1941, in the title role Canio in the German-language staging of Leoncavallo's Pagliacci (Der Bajazzo). He served as a soldier in World War II. From 1948 to 1950, he sang at the Pfalztheater in Kaiserslautern. He then moved to the Mannheim National Theatre.

He studied baritone roles with Fritz Krauss, singing from 1951 at the Badisches Staatstheater Karlsruhe. He was advised there to use an artist name. His first performance as Marcel Cordes was Wolfram von Eschenbach in Wagner's Tannhäuser. It was the beginning of a career that took him to major German-language opera houses, concert halls and broadcasters.

From 1954, Cordes was a member of the Bavarian State Opera in Munich, singing also on major stages in Europe, such as He was named a Bavarian Kammersänger in 1956. In December 1957, he was Ford in Verdi's Falstaff in Berlin when Dietrich Fischer-Dieskau sang the title role for the first time. He appeared at the Bayreuth Festival from 1962 to 1964, as Donner in Das Rheingold and as Gunther in Götterdämmerung in all three years.

Cordes was known for leading baritone parts in Italian opera, such as Enrico in Donizetti's Lucia di Lammermoor, the title role in Verdi's Nabucco, Egbert in his Aroldo, and Ford in Falstaff. In German language versions of Verdi, he played Luna in his Il trovatore (Der Troubadour), and Don Carlos in La forza del destino (Die Macht des Schicksals). In Puccini operas, he portrayed Sharpless in Puccini's Madama Butterfly, and the title role of his Gianni Schicchi.

He retired from the stage due to deafness in one ear, and lived in Tyrol, where he died in Angerberg.

== Recordings ==
Cordes recorded several baritone parts, in both complete opera recordings and excerpts. He appeared in 1956 as the King in the first complete recording of Carl Orff's Die Kluge. Wolfgang Sawallisch conducted the Philharmonia Orchestra, with Gottlob Frick as the peasant and Elisabeth Schwarzkopf as his daughter in the title role. Complete works have also included Feuersnot by Richard Strauss and Pfitzner's Die Rose vom Liebesgarten. The Hamburger Archiv für Gesangskunst issued an overview of his art in a collection CD-Edition Marcel Cordes of twelve CDs in four boxes: Giuseppe Verdi, Belcanto & Verismo, Opern Streifzug of German and European Opera, and Moderne – Konzert – Lieder (Contemporary – concert, song recital). A short overview of single scenes was published on CD, titled Dokumente einer Sängerkarriere (Documents of a singer's career) by Preiser Records.
