= Knights' War =

16th-century conflict in the Holy Roman Empire

- Part of the European wars of religion and the Protestant Reformation
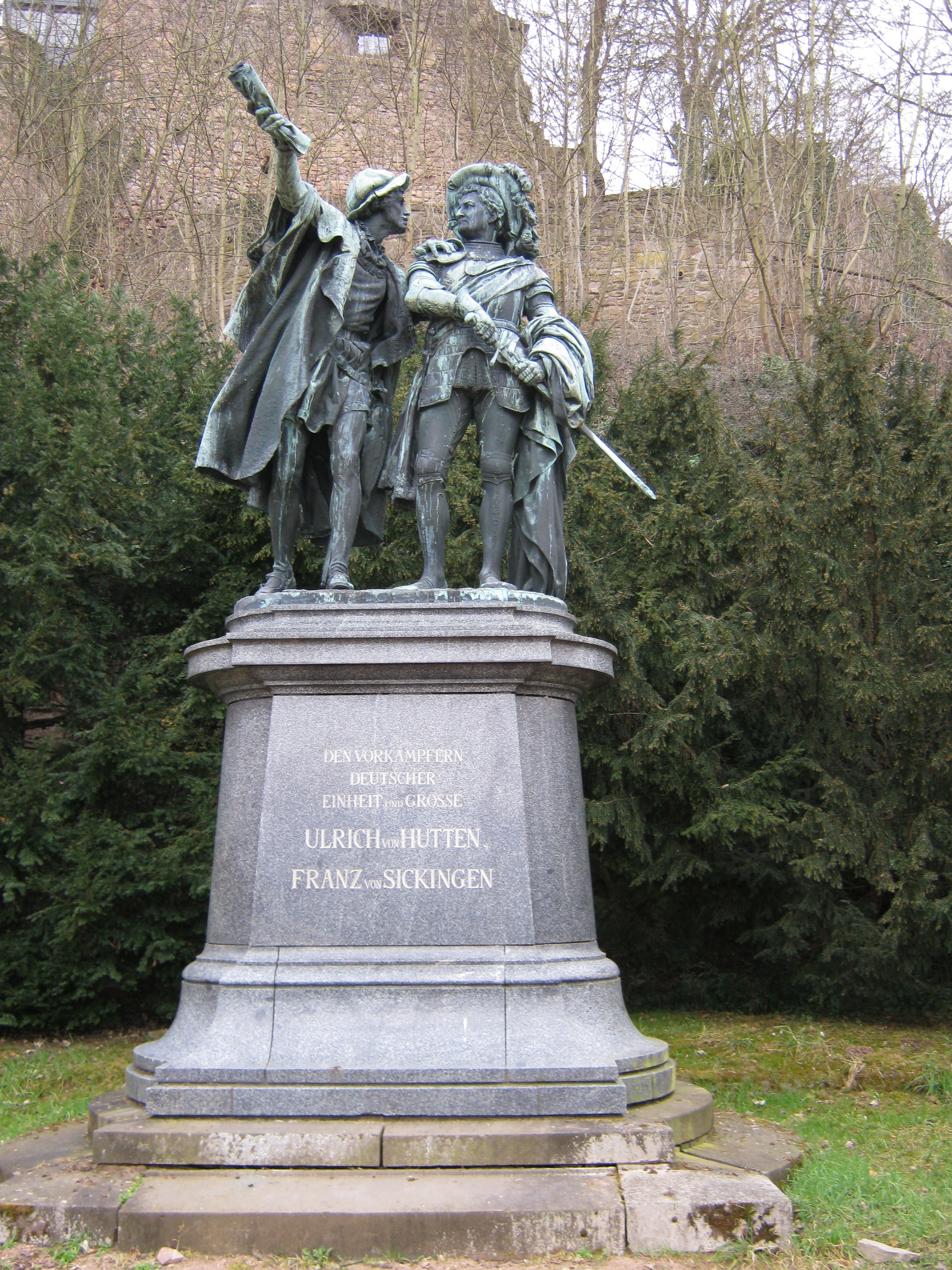
- Hutten-Sickingen Monument, Ebernburg Castle
Date	27 August 1522 – 6 May 1523
Location	Electoral Rhenish and Upper Rhenish circles of the Holy Roman Empire (present-day Southern Germany)
Result	Imperial victory

Belligerents
Brotherly Convention (Note: Sickingen claimed he was acting on behalf of the Emperor, and accordingly had his soldiers fly the imperial banner.)	Holy Roman Empire; Swabian League

Commanders and leaders
Franz von Sickingen †; Ulrich von Hutten	Richard, Prince-Bishop of Trier; Louis V, Count Palatine of the Rhine; Philip, Landgrave of Hesse

Strength
c. 5,000 infantry; c. 1,500 cavalry; c. 36 guns	c. 5,500 infantry; c. 1,000 cavalry; c. 14 guns

The Knights' War, also known as the Imperial Knights' Revolt (27 August 1522 – 6 May 1523), was a failed attempt by the Brotherly Convention (of knights) led by the Evangelical knight Franz von Sickingen to forcibly remove Richard, Prince-Bishop of Trier and secularize his lands. The private feud resulted in the death of Sickingen and likely inspired the German Peasants' War of 1524–1526.

== Background ==
=== Imperial knights ===
In the late Middle Ages, the imperial knights were in a period of constant decline. The encroachment of urban-dominated trade and industry on traditional agriculture, combined with rising interest rates and declining land values, harmed the knights financially, while the increasingly wealthy cities of the Holy Roman Empire had become powerful enough to resist attacks. The growing power of the higher nobility, or the princes, helped by the introduction of Roman law which was sweeping away previous common law, hurt the knights politically. On top of this, their importance in combat was declining with the advance of military technology and tactics. Mercenary Landsknechts were now the staple of warfare, and the importance of personal ability and bravery in warfare was much reduced. The effectiveness of the arquebus was apparent by the Battle of Cerignola of 1503, which is the earliest-recorded military conflict where arquebuses played a decisive role in the outcome of battle. The heavy arquebus known as the musket appeared in Europe by 1521.

The knights refused to co-operate with both the higher nobility to gain power from the cities and with the cities against the princes. Even had the knights attempted to work with the cities or the higher nobility to bring about reform it is extremely unlikely that the higher nobility would have responded favourably.

Conditions in Germany were not like conditions in England. In England, the War of the Roses (1455–1485) that brought Henry VII to the throne had spelled the end of the feudal aristocracy. Prior to the reign of Henry VII the feudal aristocracy had free hand in ruling the country. On the throne, Henry VII sought to strengthen and centralize his government. To do that he needed funds. When his predecessors on the English throne had attempted to raise additional funds, they sought to obtain additional lands for the crown. Under the feudal system, more land would result in more income. However, the king realized that a more efficient way of raising money for his government was to tax the income of the rising class of merchants—especially those in the trade in wool and woolen cloth. Indeed, as a "good businessman" and as a politician, Henry VII was aware that "to enrich the merchants was to enrich himself through increased customs duties". At the same time, Henry VII would "win the gratitude of the business classes". It was this mechanism that weakened and finally ruined the feudal system in England.

In Germany, however, the same conditions did not exist. There was no strong central government in Germany to collect customs duties on trade. Instead, income from trade flowed directly back to the feudal lords located in the various principalities and fiefdoms throughout Germany. With Germany divided into a patchwork of small kingdoms and fiefdoms, governmental power lay securely under the control of local feudal lords. In order to bring about the reforms they wanted, the knights needed the united support of both the cities and the peasantry. However, this united support proved to be elusive. The peasantry distrusted the knights almost as much as the higher nobility. Only a plan that included a total abolition of serfdom, bondage, and the privileges of the nobility could induce the peasantry to join the knights in the struggle for reform.

=== Eternal Peace of 1495 ===
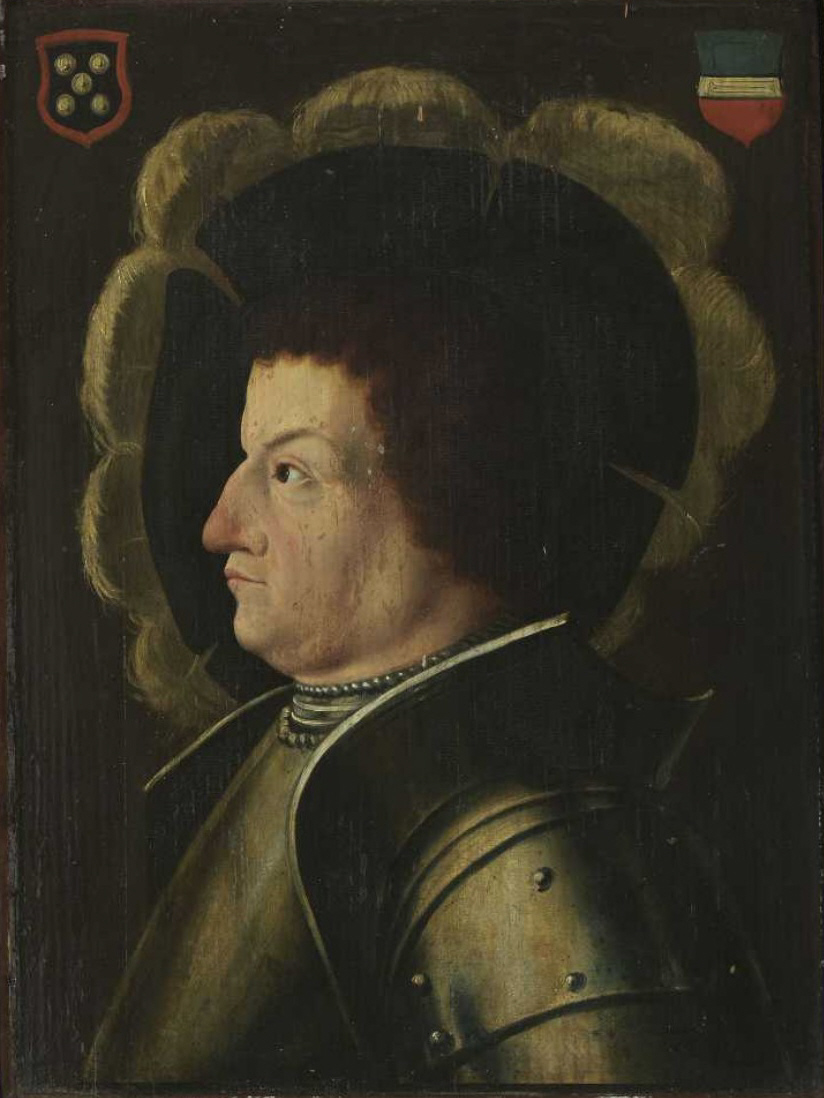
Franz von Sickingen

In the 1495 Reichstag, the Imperial Cities presented an Act of Protest, containing several points, that pointed to their lack of effective representation in the Reichstag. However, the only part of the Act which was actually passed was the ban on private warfare. Even then, the princes made sure that the ban applied only to the knights and specifically exempted any private wars in which the princes might engage. This took from the knights a major source of income and pride. Capturing and holding cities and princes for ransom had been the main source of income for knights.

Sickingen, often called the "Last Knight", lived most of his life along the Rhine. After spending some time in the service of the Emperor Maximillian against Venice, he spent many years terrorizing cities and princes up and down the Rhine, which made him a very rich man. When the election of 1519 took place, he accepted heavy bribes from Francis I of France, but eventually led his troops to Frankfurt where their presence helped to ensure the victory of Charles V. After this, Sickingen mounted an invasion of French Picardy for Charles.

=== Protestant Reformation ===
Sickingen became acquainted with Ulrich von Hutten, a religious humanist knight. Together, Hutten and Sickingen formulated a series of suggested reforms calling for the abolition of all independent principalities, for the unification of all German-speaking lands under one national government, the secularization of all church principalities and estates, and establishment of a "noblemen's democracy headed by a monarch". Hutten and Sickingen hoped that this program would be sufficient to encourage the peasantry to enthusiastically join the knights in bringing about reform.

Under Hutten's influence, Sickingen's castle of Ebernburg became a centre of Renaissance humanist and later Lutheran thinking, with many pamphlets emanating from the castle. Sickingen helped Johann Reuchlin escape from the Dominicans of Cologne, and sheltered other reformers such as Martin Bucer and Johannes Oecolampadius. He even offered shelter to Martin Luther after the Diet of Worms, but Luther chose to stay with Frederick of Saxony instead.

== Sickingen's campaign ==
=== Brotherly Convention ===
In 1522, while the Emperor was in Spain, Sickingen convened a "Brotherly Convention" of knights. The Convention elected him as their leader, and resolved to take by force that which the knights had been unable to obtain through their poor representation in the Reichstag. The target chosen by the knights to start their revolt was Richard, Prince-Bishop of Trier; a staunch opponent of Luther and his supporters. The excuse used for the attack was an unpaid ransom by two city councillors to another knight who had captured them some years ago. Sickingen’s declaration of war was full of religious rhetoric designed to encourage the people of the city to surrender and overthrow their archbishop, and so save the knights the trouble of a siege.

Sickingen assembled an army partly on his own and partly with the help of neighboring knights. Sickingen had his soldiers fly the Imperial flag, and he claimed he was acting on behalf of the Emperor. However, the Imperial Diet in Nuremberg which was acting as regent during the absence of Charles V, did not agree, and ordered him to stop his campaign under threat of an imperial ban. The campaign was launched in the autumn, which indicates that Sickingen did not intend to press on further that year.

=== Siege of Trier ===
Sickingen ignored the Diet, however, and pressed on to Trier. Unfortunately for him, the people of the city did not revolt against Richard, and Richard proved to be an able soldier. In addition, the Count palatine and the Landgrave of Hesse came to Richard’s aid. After seven days siege, including five assault attempts, Sickingen ran out of gunpowder, and retreated to Ebernberg. Meanwhile, the Imperial Regency Council laid on him the Ban of the Empire. During his retreat, his detractors alleged that he plundered the entire countryside, including the town of Kaiserslautern. However, his supporters maintained that they only plundered Catholic churches and monasteries.

== Siege of Nanstein Castle ==
Sickingen left Ebernberg to spend the winter at Nanstein Castle near Landstuhl, his strongest castle, which had recently had extensive repairs, where he hoped to carry on the struggle. Nanstein was reckoned to be one of the strongest castles in Germany. Sickingen felt safe in Landstuhl. Hutten fled to Switzerland, and with other emissaries began looking for support for a new military campaign for the following year.

When Richard, Prince-Bishop of Trier; Louis V, Count Palatine of the Rhine; and Philip, Landgrave of Hesse laid siege to his castle near Landstuhl; Sickingen fully expected to last at least four months, by which time reinforcements would arrive to rescue him. However, he had underestimated the power of the new artillery weapons, and within one week his defences were in ruins and he had received a very serious wound himself. On 7 May 1523, he surrendered to the three princes, and died of his wounds. With his death, knighthood as a significant force in Germany died too. Hutten only outlived Sickingen by a few months, first meeting the reformer Huldrych Zwingli in Zürich, before dying alone of syphilis in a Swiss monastery.

== Aftermath ==
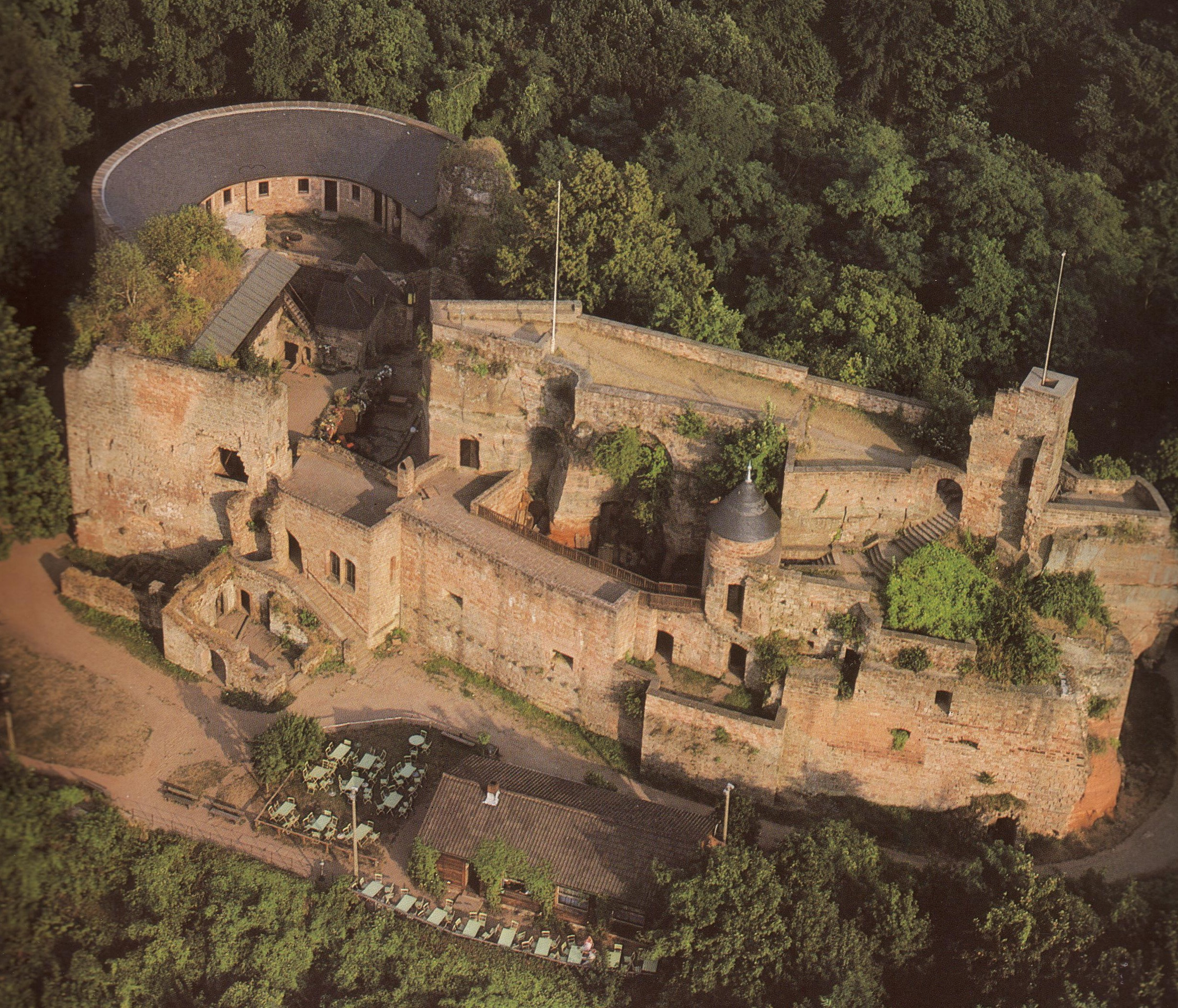
Ruins of Nanstein Castle

Most of the Revolt's significant supporters had their castles confiscated. Albrecht, Prince-Bishop of Mainz was even fined for his suspected complicity in the plot. The knights were now generally bankrupt as a result of the Revolt's inability to change their situation in the face of increasing inflation, declining agriculture, increased demands by the princes, and the inability to live by legal ‘highway robbery’.

Most knights thereafter lived as petty feudal masters, making a living by taxing their peasants hard. They had no real independence now, and those that did rise above their status did so by acting as competent managers, priests, and generals for the princes. A few, such as Florian Geyer, refused to give in, and assisted the peasants in their own rebellion a few years later.

The widespread refusal to pay church tithes during the Revolt subsequently spread to the peasant classes, and inspired them to refuse to pay the tithe which was one of the factors leading to the Peasants' Revolt. Thus either the government of the province would have to deal with the corrupt institutions, or the peasants would take this into their own hands and plunder them.
