= Franz von Sickingen =

Knight of the Holy Roman Empire (1481–1523)

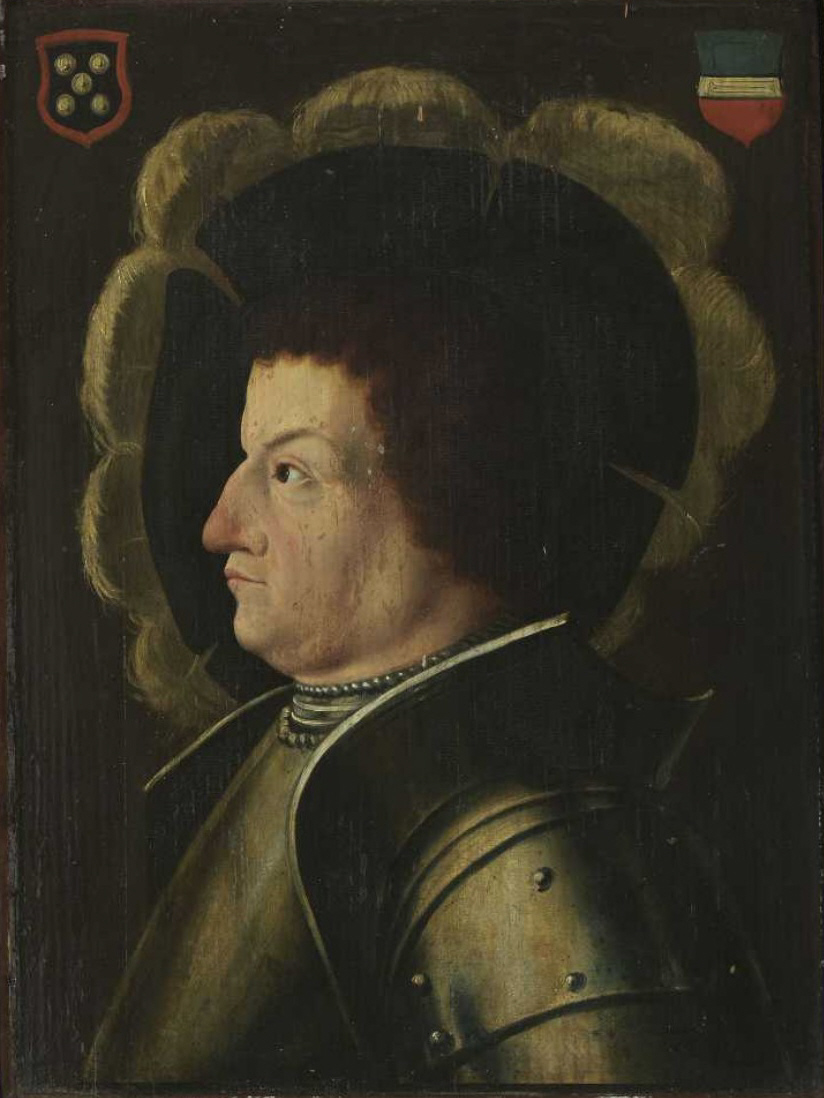
- Born: 2 March 1481; Ebernburg Castle
- Died: 7 May 1523 (aged 42); Nanstein Castle
- Buried: Chapel of St. Mary (present-day St. Andreas-Kirche), Landstuhl
- Noble family: Sickingen
- Spouse: Hedwig von Flersheim (m. 1500; died 1516)
- Father: Schweickhardt von Sickingen
- Mother: Margarethe Puller von der Hohenburg
- Memorials: Hutten-Sickingen Monument
- Military service
- Allegiance: Holy Roman Empire (Note: Sickingen had his soldiers fly the Imperial flag, and he claimed he was acting on behalf of the Emperor.)
- Wars: "Knights' War" (POW) (DOW)

Franz von Sickingen (German pronunciation: [ˈfʁants fɔn ˈzɪkɪŋən]; 2 March 1481 – 7 May 1523) was a knight of the Holy Roman Empire who, with Ulrich von Hutten, led the so-called "Knights' War". He is posthumously known as the "Last Knight" (der letzte Ritter), an epithet shared with his contemporaries Chevalier de Bayard and Emperor Maximilian.

== Early life ==
Franz von Sickingen was born on 2 March 1481 at Ebernburg Castle in the Palatinate of the Holy Roman Empire to Schweickhardt von Sickingen and his wife Margarethe Puller von der Hohenburg. Franz was married to Hedwig von Flersheim (d. 1515). Having fought for the emperor Maximilian I against Venice in 1508, he inherited large estates on the Rhine, and increased his wealth and reputation by numerous private feuds, in which he usually posed as the friend of the oppressed.

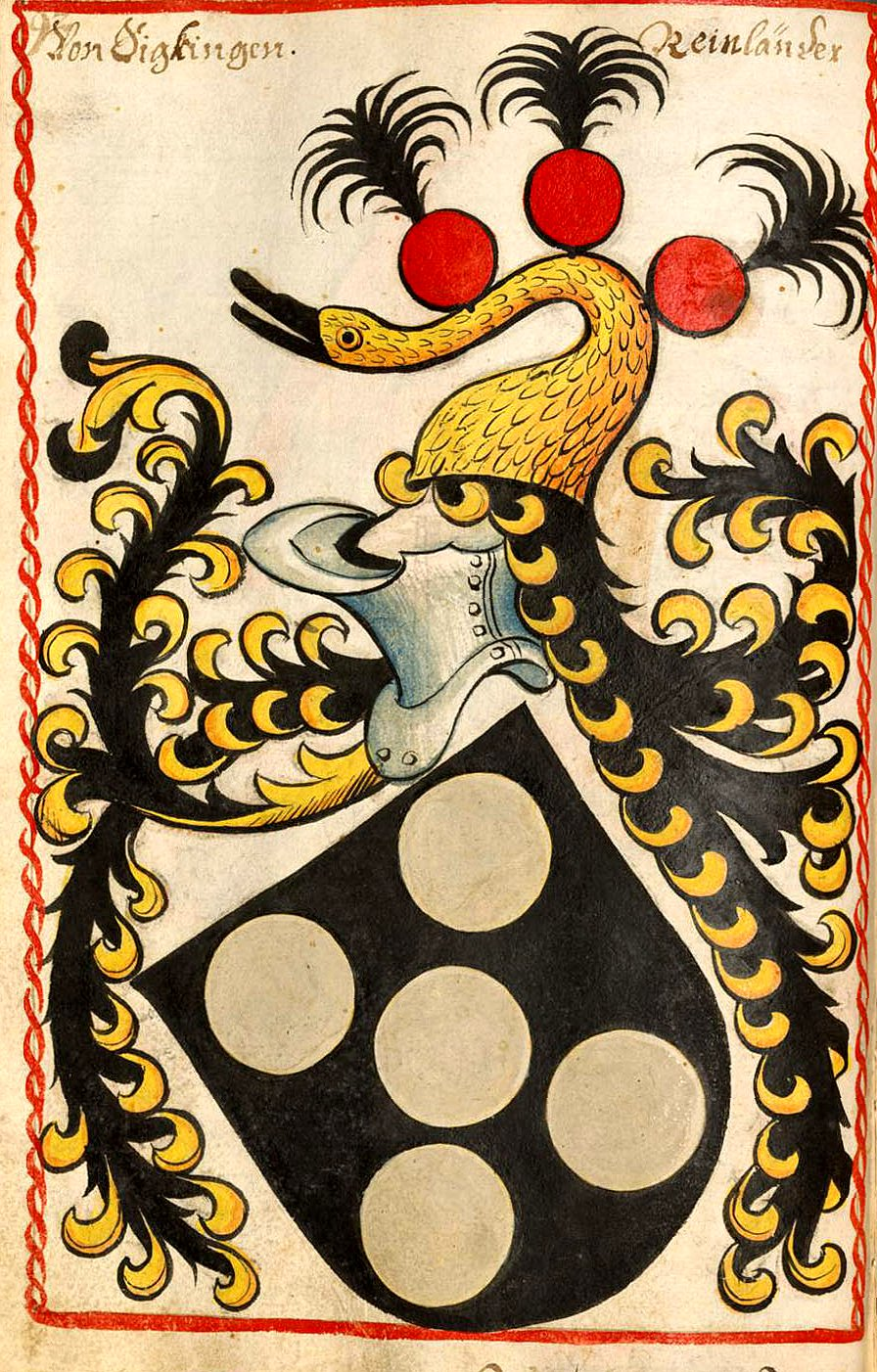
Coat of arms of the House of Sickingen

In 1513, Sickingen took up the quarrel of Balthasar Schlör, a citizen who had been driven out of Worms, and attacked it with 7000 men. In spite of an imperial ban, he devastated its lands, intercepted its commerce, and desisted only when his demands were granted. He made war on Antoine, Duke of Lorraine, and compelled Philip, Landgrave of Hesse, to pay him 35,000 gulden. In 1518 he interfered in a civil conflict in Metz, ostensibly siding with the citizens against the governing oligarchy. He led an army of 20,000 against it, compelled the magistrates to give him 20,000 gulden and a month's pay for his troops. In 1518, Maximilian released him from the ban, and he took part in the war carried on by the Swabian League against Ulrich, Duke of Württemberg.

In the contest for the imperial throne upon the death of Maximilian in 1519, Sickingen accepted bribes from King Francis I of France, but when the election took place he led his troops to Frankfurt, where their presence assisted to secure the election of Charles V. For this service he was made imperial chamberlain and councillor, and in 1521 he led an expedition into France, which ravaged Picardy, but was beaten back from Mézières and forced to retreat.

In about 1517 Sickingen first met Ulrich von Hutten, and gave his support to Hutten's schemes. He assisted many a creditor in procuring what was due him from a powerful debtor. Without being a scholar, he loved science and protected men of learning. In 1519 a threat from him freed Johann Reuchlin from his enemies, the Dominicans of Cologne. His castles became (in Hutten's words) a "refuge for righteousness" (Herberge der Gerechtigkeit). Here many of the reformers found shelter, and a retreat was offered to Martin Luther.

== Knights' War ==
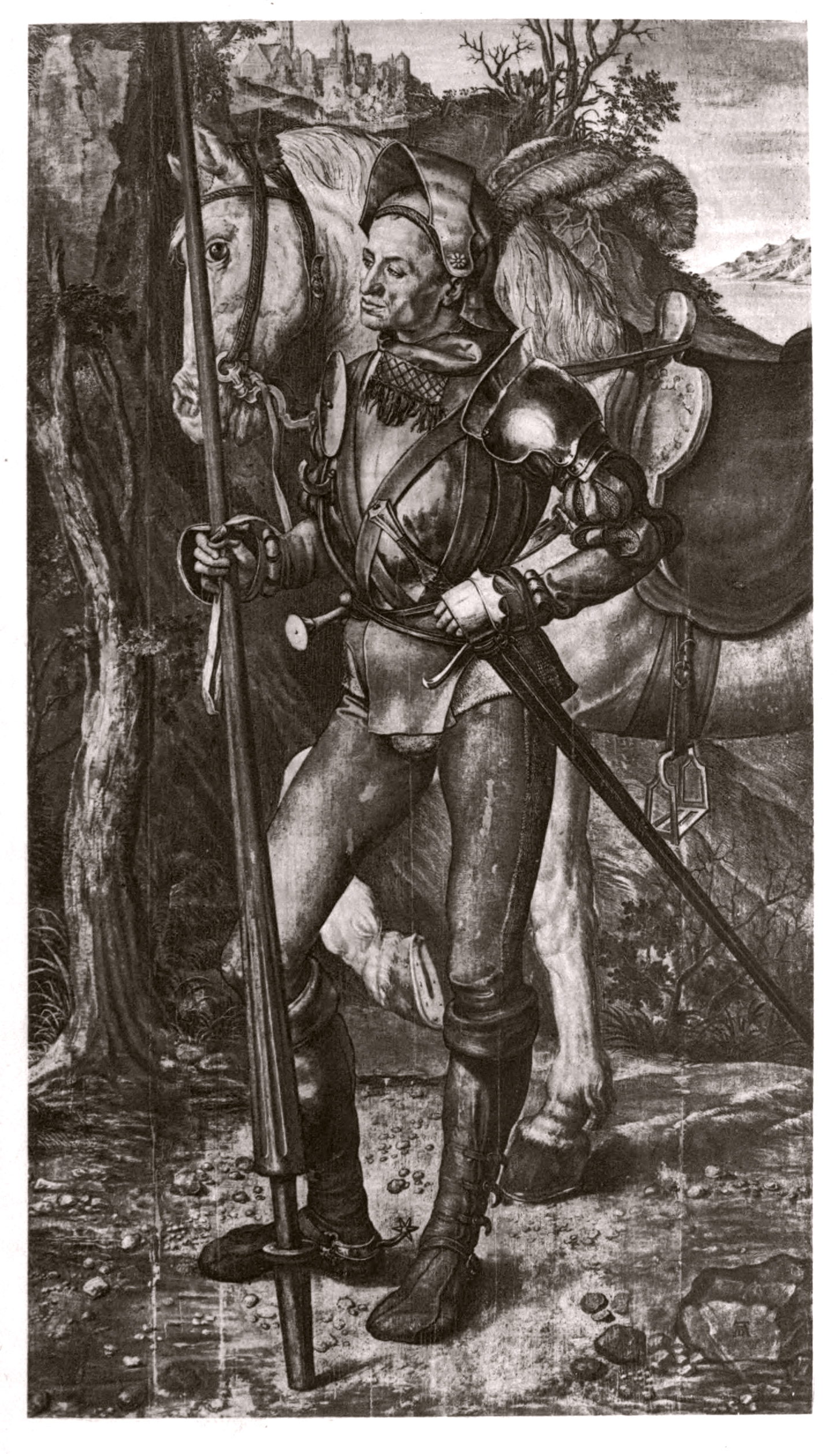
Franz von Sickingen, by Ferdinand Wolfgang Flachenecker, after the Paumgartner altarpiece by Albrecht Dürer, 1889. Lithograph on chine collé.

After the failure of the French expedition, Sickingen, aided by Hutten, formed, or revived, a large scheme to overthrow the spiritual princes and to elevate the order of knighthood, the Knights' War. He hoped to secure this by the help of the towns and peasantry, and promote his own situation. A large army was soon collected, many nobles from the upper Rhineland joined the standard, and at Landau, in August 1522, Sickingen was formally named commander. He declared war against his old enemy, Richard Greiffenklau of Vollraths, Archbishop of Trier, and marched against that city. Trier was loyal to the archbishop, and the landgrave of Hesse and Louis V, count palatine of the Rhine, hastened to his assistance. Sickingen, without the help he needed, was compelled to fall back on his castle, Nanstein Castle, above Landstuhl.

=== Siege of Nanstein ===
On 22 October 1522 the council of regency placed him under the ban, to which he replied, in the spring of 1523, by plundering Kaiserslautern. The Archbishop of Trier, Palatine Elector Louis V, and the Landgrave of Hesse decided to move against him, and having obtained help from the Swabian League, marched on Nanstein Castle. He refused to negotiate, and during the siege was mortally wounded. This was one of the first occasions artillery was used, and breaches were soon made in an otherwise impregnable fortress. On 6 May 1523 Sickingen was forced to capitulate, and died the following day. He was buried in the old Mary's Chapel (present-day St. Andreas-Kirche), Landstuhl.

== Issue ==
Sickingen's six children included two sons. Schweikhard von Sickingen zu Neuenbürg (1500-1562) and Franz Conrad (1511-1575). Franz Conrad was made baron of the Empire (Reichsfreiherr) by Maximilian II.

== Honours ==
In 1889, the Hutten-Sickingen Monument of Bad Münster am Stein-Ebernburg in Rhineland-Palatinate, Germany, was built above the town to commemorate Hutten and Sickingen's role in the Knights' War.

== Legacy ==
Ferdinand Lasalle's 1859 play "Franz von Sickingen: A Historical Tragedy" was a five-part drama based on the knight's life. This work sparked intense debate on socialist aesthetics between Lasalle on the one hand and Karl Marx and Friedrich Engels on the other, which became known as the "Sickingen Debate".

== Sources ==
- This work in turn cites:
  - H. Ulmann, Franz von Sickingen (Leipzig, 1872)
  - F. P. Bremer, Sickingens Fehde gegen Trier (Strassburg, 1883)
  - H. Prutz, Franz von Sickingen in Der neue Plutarch (Leipzig, 1880)
  - U. von Hutten, "Flersheimer Chronik" in Hutten's Deutsche Schriften, edited by O. Waltz (sic!) and Szamatolati (sic!) (Strassburg, 1891)
