= Bruchmühlbach-Miesau =

- Municipality
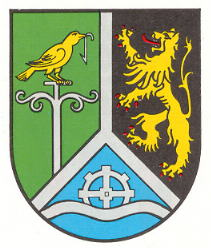
- Coat of arms

- Location of Bruchmühlbach-Miesau within Kaiserslautern district
- Interactive map of Bruchmühlbach-Miesau
- Location within Germany Location within Rhineland-Palatinate
- Coordinates: 49°23′10″N 7°26′27″E
- Country: Germany
- State: Rhineland-Palatinate
- District: Kaiserslautern
- Municipal assoc.: Bruchmühlbach-Miesau
- Subdivisions: 5 Ortsteile

Government
  - Mayor (2019–24): Rüdiger Franz (SPD)

Area
  - Total: 26.85 km^{2} (10.37 sq mi)
- Elevation: 235 m (771 ft)

Population (2025-12-31)
  - Total: 8,143
  - Density: 303.3/km^{2} (785.5/sq mi)
- Time zone: UTC+01:00 (CET)
  - Summer (DST): UTC+02:00 (CEST)
- Postal codes: 66892
- Dialling codes: 06372
- Vehicle registration: KL
- Website: www.bruchmuehlbach-miesau.de

Bruchmühlbach-Miesau (German pronunciation: [ˈbʁʊxˌmyːlbax ˈmiːzaʊ]) is a municipality in the district of Kaiserslautern in Rhineland-Palatinate, Germany. It is situated on the small river Glan, approx. 10 km north-east of Homburg, and 25 km west of Kaiserslautern. It has many festivals and is the home of two storks which are the pride of the village. Nearby is the Miesau Army Depot, a United States Army installation. Also nearby is Ohmbachsee, a small lake that is a popular location for concerts, festivals and the weekend.

Bruchmühlbach-Miesau is the seat of the Verbandsgemeinde ("collective municipality") Bruchmühlbach-Miesau.

== History ==
The towns of Bruchmühlbach and Miesau, now joined, have a long history. Bruchmühlbach was first mentioned in the year 900 and Miesau in 1222 in a charter by King Heinrich VII. The present combination of the two towns occurred in 1972.

== Population ==
According to a 2004 census, Bruchmühlbach-Miesau area has a population of 8,093, broken down as follows:

Bruchmühlbach 2,813
Miesau 2,550
Vogelbach 1,241
Buchholz 1,028
Elschbach 461
