= Bruchmühlbach-Miesau (Verbandsgemeinde) =

Verbandsgemeinde in Rhineland-Palatinate

- Verbandsgemeinde
- Location of Bruchmühlbach-Miesau within Kaiserslautern district
- Interactive map of Bruchmühlbach-Miesau
- Location within Germany Location within Rhineland-Palatinate
- Coordinates: 49°23′N 7°26′E
- Country: Germany
- State: Rhineland-Palatinate
- District: Kaiserslautern
- Seat: Bruchmühlbach-Miesau
- Subdivisions: 5 municipalities

Area
  - Total: 59.57 km^{2} (23.00 sq mi)

Population (2025-12-31)
  - Total: 10,643
  - Density: 178.7/km^{2} (462.7/sq mi)
- Time zone: UTC+01:00 (CET)
  - Summer (DST): UTC+02:00 (CEST)
- Website: www.bruchmuehlbach-miesau.de

Bruchmühlbach-Miesau is a Verbandsgemeinde ("collective municipality") in the district of Kaiserslautern, Rhineland-Palatinate, Germany. The seat of the Verbandsgemeinde is in Bruchmühlbach-Miesau.

The Verbandsgemeinde Bruchmühlbach-Miesau consists of the following Ortsgemeinden ("local municipalities"):

1. Bruchmühlbach-Miesau
2. Gerhardsbrunn
3. Lambsborn
4. Langwieden
5. Martinshöhe
