= Schwickart the Younger of Sickingen =

Schwickart the Younger of Sickingen (German: Schwickart der Jüngere von Sickingen) (–1478), also written Schweikart, Schweickart or Swicker, was an imperial knight and, from 1459, held the office of Amtmann (akin to a bailiff) in the Electoral Palatine Amt of Bretten.

== Family ==
Schwickart was the son of Schwickart VI of Sickingen (died before 1468) and Elisabeth Landschad of Steinach. He married Anna Spet of Zwiefalten, daughter of Albert Spet of Zwiefalten and Clara of Ehestetten. Their marriage produced a son, Conrad, who was appointed as advocate, or Vogt, of Bretten from 1504 to 1508.

== Life ==
Schwickart of Sickingen came from an old Kraichgau aristocratic family. His duties as amtmann are recorded in a deed as follows: he is to vouchsafe legal protection for all the townsfolk and inhabitants of the Amt. He is also to provide escorts free of charge for all tradesmen, pilgrims and travellers on the "escort roads" (Geleitstraßen) - part of a law known as the Geleitrecht - and only accept voluntary donations in return. His income was 150 guilders and the use of ten morgens of pasture, a herb garden, wood and right to the "small tithe".

He died on 4 August 1478.
