= Hugo Schmitt =

German-American circus artist and elephant trainer

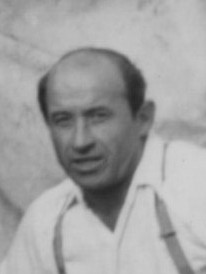
- Hugo Schmitt in Sweden 1944
- Born: July 19, 1904; Bann, Rheinland-Pfalz, Germany
- Died: August 9, 1977 (aged 73); Sarasota, Florida, United States
- Occupation: Animal trainer
- Known for: International elephant trainer
- Spouse: Jenny Schmitt (before 1999)
- Children: 4

Hugo Schmitt, born July 19, 1904, in Bann, Landkreis Kaiserslautern, in Southwestern Rheinland-Pfalz in Germany, dead August 9, 1977, in Sarasota, Florida, United States, was a German-American circus artist, animal trainer and one of the world's most famous elephant trainers with a record of 55 elephants performing in the ring. Starting his career at Carl Hagenbeck Circus-Stellingen in Germany, Schmitt was elephant superintendent at the world's largest circus, Ringling Bros. and Barnum & Bailey Circus in the US from 1947 to 1971.

== Germany ==
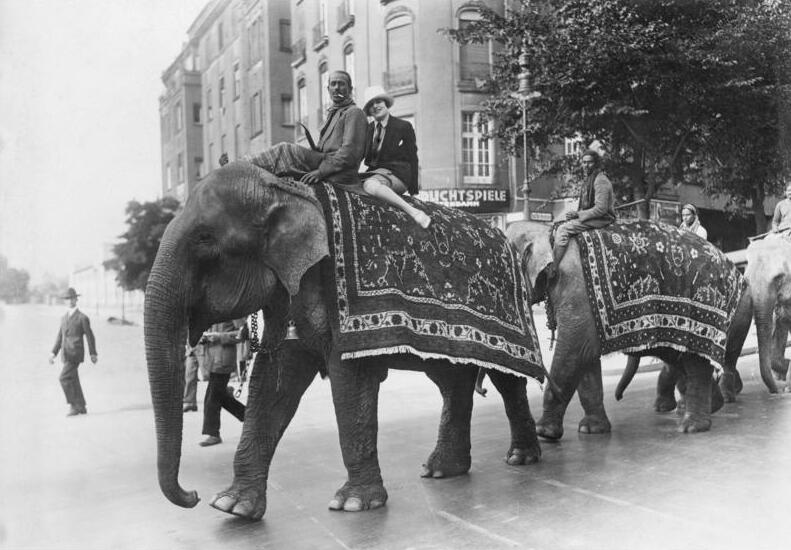
Circus Hagenbeck in Berlin, 1926

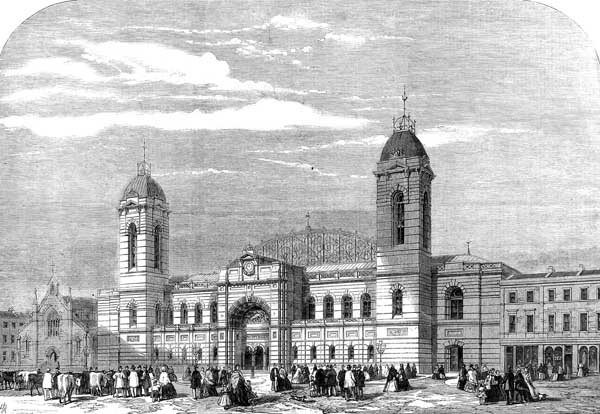
The Royal Agricultural Hall in 1861, seen from Liverpool Road, which is now the rear entrance to the Business Design Centre.

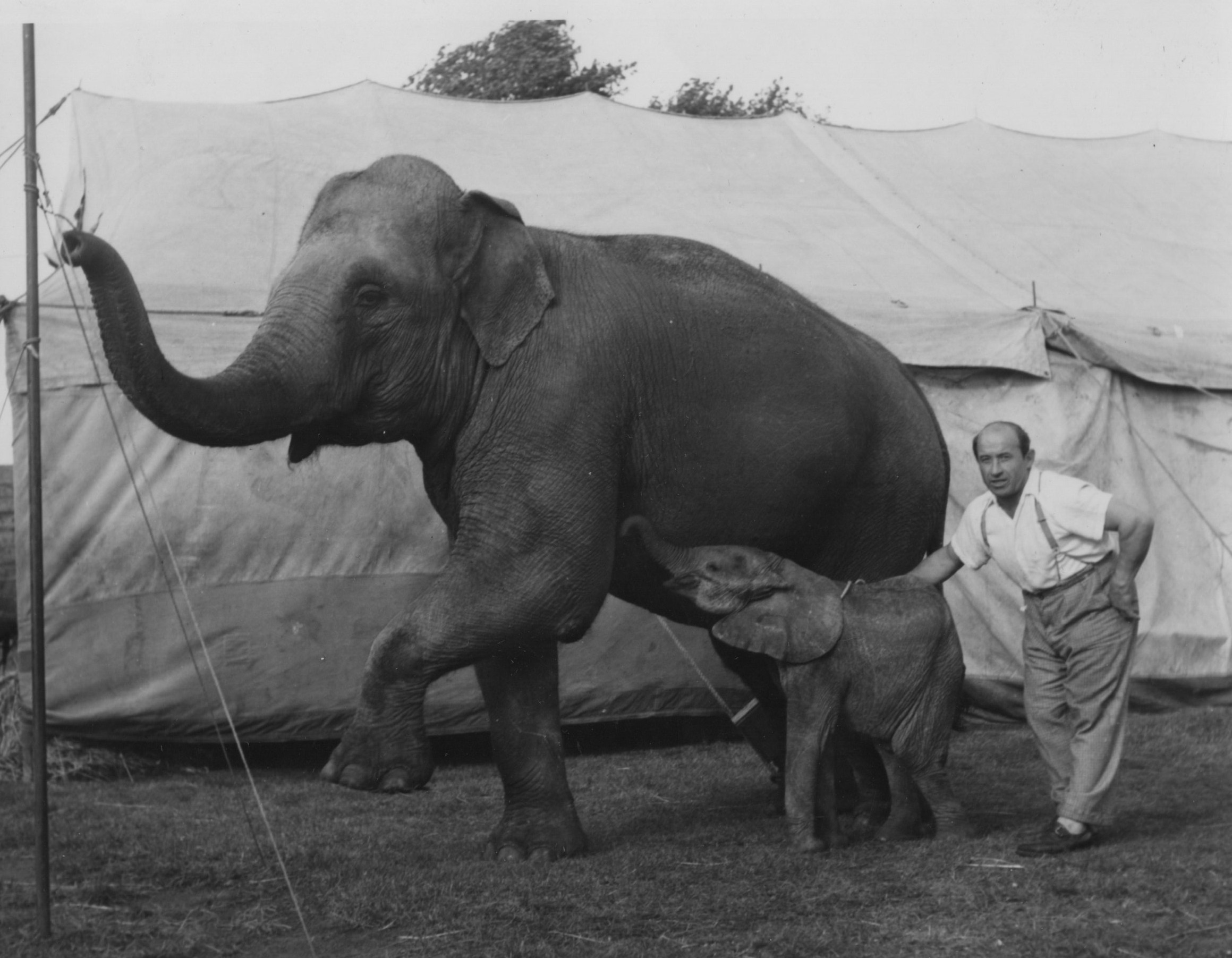
Hugo Schmitt on Zoo Cirkus with an African baby elephant, 1944

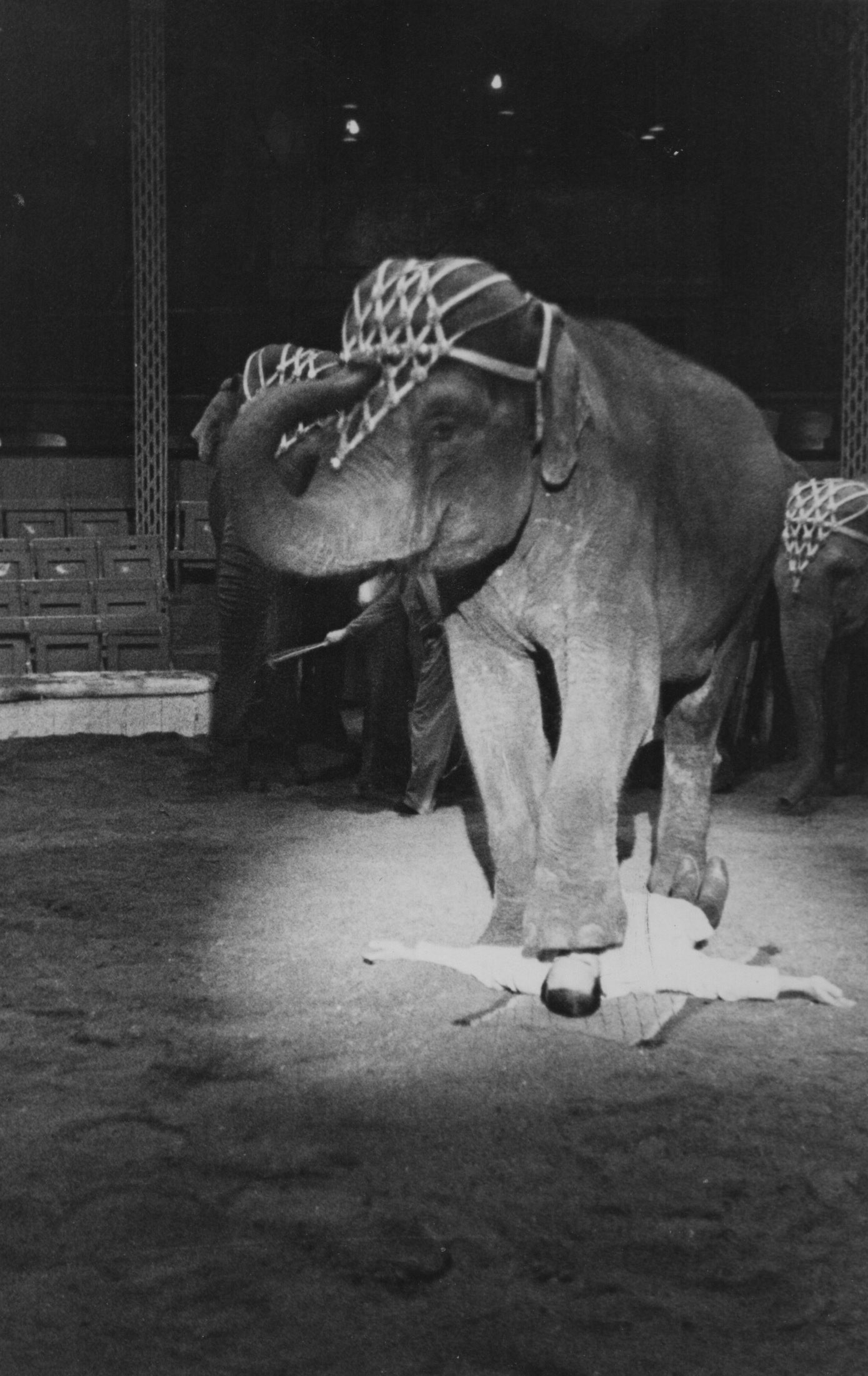
Hugo Schmitt under elephant Kanaudi, Lorensbergs Cirkus in Gothenborg, 1944

=== Tierpark Hagenbeck ===
Hugo Schmitt, being son to the lumberjack Peter Schmitt and his wife Anna-Maria, started his career at famous German Tierpark Hagenbeck in Hamburg-Stellingen, founded 1907 by Carl Hagenbeck (1844–1913) as Hagenbeck's third zoo in Hamburg.

Schmitt learned elephant training from Hagenbecks famous elephant trainer William Philadelphia, and advanced to head elephant keeper in the zoo, which in this time also served as import and quarantine for elephants imported from Asia and Africa, and thus served as a hub for elephants, elephant training, trade and export throughout the western world.

=== Carl Hagenbeck Circus ===
In 1916 Carl Hagenbecks son Lorenz Hagenbeck (1882–1956) bought a dysfunctional circus with 63 horses and 3 elephants from Adolf Strassburger, thereby founding Carl Hagenbeck Circus-Stellingen, after which Schmitt became chief trainer of elephants at the circus, touring Germany and Europe, while being replaced in the zoo in Hamburg-Stellingen by a new head keeper, Fritz Theisinger (born 1906). In 1929-1930 elephants both from the circus and from the zoo was exhibited, with an impressing number of forty-one elephants at Hamburg Heiligengeist Field. After the opening shows in Hamburg, the larger enterprise went to Scandinavia and the smaller to Holland. During those years, the circus also had some African bull elephants, and Schmitt is claimed to have been one of the first western elephant trainers to work African elephants on circus.

During the 1930s Hugo Schmitt went several times to India, in order to select elephants to import to Europe, and he married Jenny, from the island Sylt, part of Nordfriesland district, Schleswig-Holstein in north Germany. During this time, unemployment accelerated in Germany and the circus faced such economy problems, that groups of animals, including elephants, were sold to Circus Sarrasani. But a highlight was a successful elephant breeding, when Minjak, although conceived in Leipzig Zoo, was born in January 1932 in Germany. While Schmitt claimed she was born in a Zoo in Essen, the author Gerhard Zapf writes that she was born in the circus elephant tent while on tour in Essen. Lorenz Hagebeck state she was born in the Hagenbeck Zoo in Stellingen, and some even claim she was born in Leipzig Zoo.

During winter season of 1936 to 1937, Schmitt showed African elephants at the Royal Agricultural Hall in Islington, a district in Greater London in England, while the second unit with Walter Kaden in charge of the elephants toured Montevideo in Uruguay from December 1936, then to Buenos Aires, Argentina, and realizing an important tour along the country in 1937, after which Hagenbecks Circus returned to Europe and took up winter quarters in Hagenbecks Viennese circus building in Austria. By then, the circus still had twenty elephants when the last tour in peace time was ended at the Bremen fair.

==== Second World War ====
Then the Second World War started, and in 1940 the circus toured Dessau, and ending up in Danzig, where Lorenz Hagenbecks second son, Herbert Hagenbeck, fell seriously ill and died, before the circus returned to Hamburg.

In July 1943 phosphorus bombs fell on Hamburg, causing the circus large damage, and again in November 1944, when Hagenbecks Tierpark was more or less destroyed in 90 minutes. 450 animals and nine men lost their lives. During the first bombs however, Hagenbeck's elephant head keeper Fritz Theisinger took the chains of the elephants, and released them into the out enclosure, in order to save their life. Lorenz Hagenbeck documented the event in his book titled Animals Are My Life:

The worst part of it, however, was the fire, which was now quite beyond control. When the first incendiaries came down on the roof of the elephant house and this burst into flames, our resourceful chief keeper, Fritz Theisinger, quickly loosed his fourteen elephants, which he had kept tethered by only one hind leg, and led them outside. There they could try to avoid the incendiaries which were falling everywhere, and they took refuge in the large pool. Next, aided by the Czech POWs, he made an attempt to save the house, but at this point the POWs lost their nerve and ran away.

— Lorenz Hagenbeck, The book Animals Are My Life

== Sweden ==
Under the supervision of Lorenz son Carlo Hagenbeck, the surviving 8 Arabian horses, camels, Rudolph Mathies with the tigers, and Hugo Schmitt with the five best elephants "Icky", "Karnaudi", "Minjak" (captive-born), "Mutu" and "Sabu", was sent to neutral Sweden, while Hugo's family, his wife Jenny and the two sons Hugh Schmitt (born 1938 in Hamburg-Stellingen), and Manfred Schmitt (born 1942 in Hamburg-Stellingen) stayed behind in Hamburg. Together with Schmitt, also came his elephant assistant, Louis "Lulu" Gautier (1887–1949), and his two children Axel Gautier (1942–1993), and Ingeborg Gautier (1929–2015).

In Sweden, they arrived at Zoo Circus, owned by Trolle Rhodin (Olof Trollhaimen Trolle Rhodin 1917–1997), who since 1941 ran his own circus in the township Fosie, outside Malmö in Sweden. Trolle Rhodin was son to famous circus owner "Brazil Jack" (Carl Max Alexander Rhodin 1871–1952). In 1944, Trolle Rhodin bought an African elephant baby, which unfortunately died after short time in the winter quarters.

Schmitt toured with Zoo Circus through Sweden on train, also educating a Swedish horse trainer, Gösta Kruse in the art of elephant training. Kruse would later be in charge of two Asian elephants Birka and Safari, which Rhodin bought in 1947, until he left to Bertram Mills Circus in England 1951, and between 1965 and his death in 1973, Gösta Kruse was elephant trainer at Circus Pinder in France.

But contrary to being safe, on March 8, 1947, was written in the Swedish newspapers that the elephants was to be confiscated as spoils of war by Sweden's government. Upset by the decision of the Swedish government to sell the animals of the former German-owned Carl Hagenbeck Circus, Hugo Schmitt turned loose the show's five bulls in Malmö on Feb. 23, 1947. The elephants charged down main street in Malmö, smashing windows, breaking lampposts and terrorizing citizens. Police, after vain attempts to halt the animals, appealed to the trainer, Capt. Hugo Schmidt, to round them up. Weeping bitterly, Schmitt finally consented and regained control of his charges. With tears streaming down his face, Schmitt said: The State is making a great mistake in selling them. They have been trained together and love each other. If they are parted they will die!

Meanwhile, Lorenz Hagenbeck contacted Ringling Brothers and Barnum & Bailey Circus in U.S.A. and offered the elephants. Mr John Ringling North came personally to Sweden and purchased the elephants, on condition that Hugo Schmitt came with them as trainer, and managed to arrange a visa for him and his assistant Axel Gautier, so they could go with the elephants to USA. Trolle Rhodin founded a second circus called Circus Caravan 1948 and toured Sweden with two circuses. Trolle married Axels sister Ingeborg Gautier in 1954, and they joined Ringling Bros. circus in 1964, when Trolle Rhodin became Ringling general manager, bringing Circus Caravan with him.

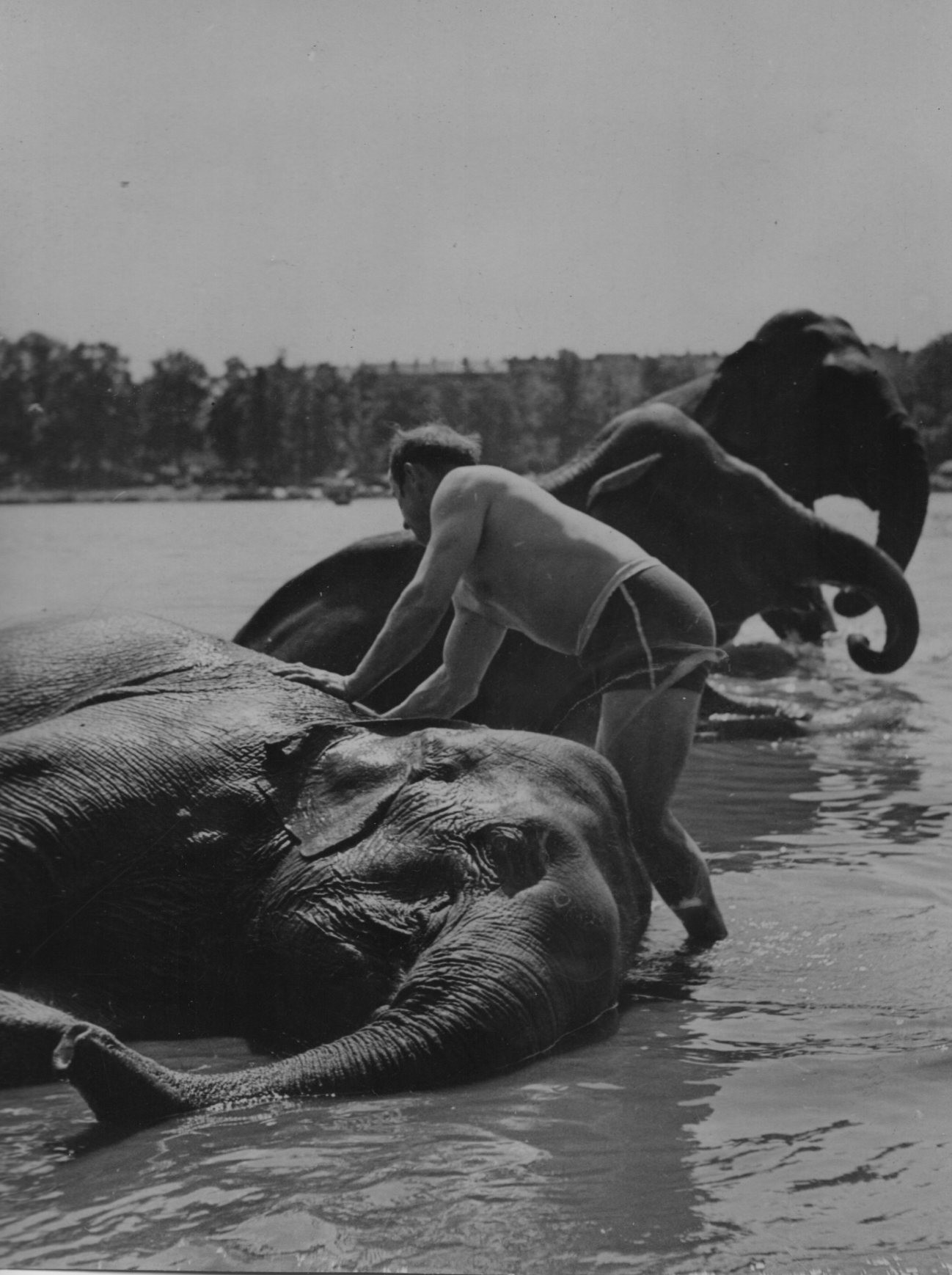
Schmitt with elephants, Brunnsviken, Stockholm, 1944

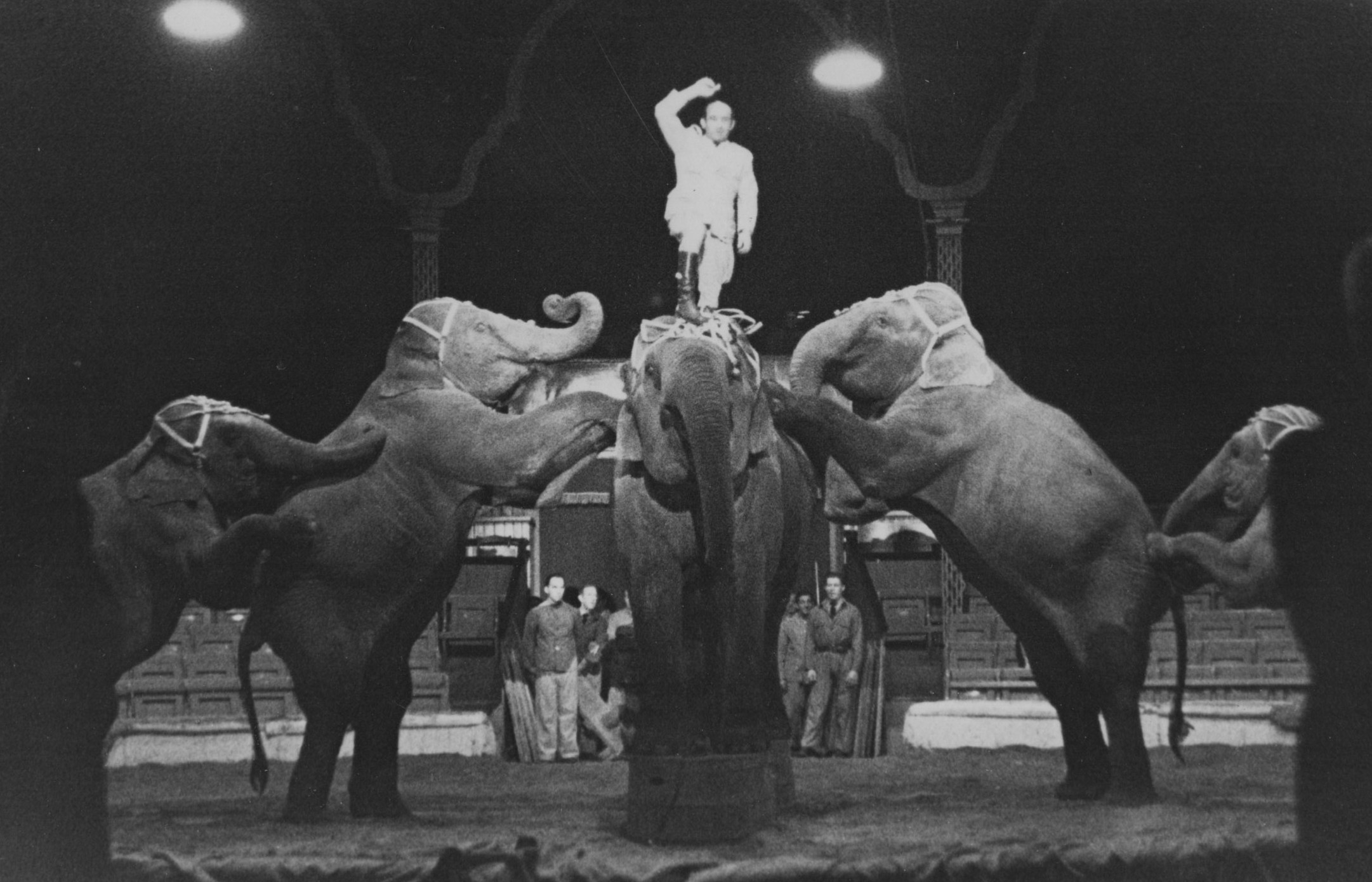
Hugo Schmitt standing on Asian elephant Kaurnardi, at Lorensbergs Cirkus in Gothenborg, 1944

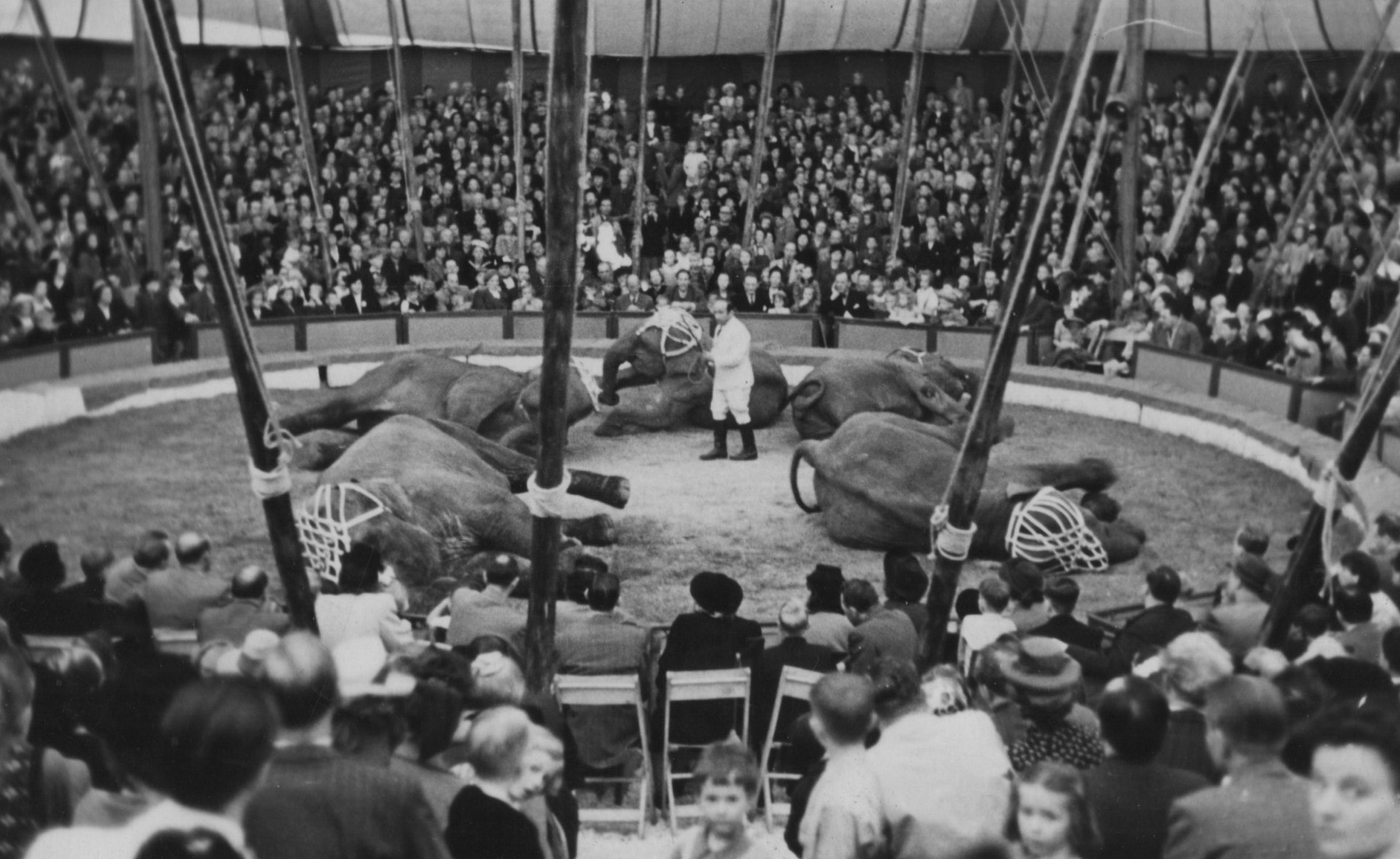
Five elephants at Zoo Circus, Sweden, 1944

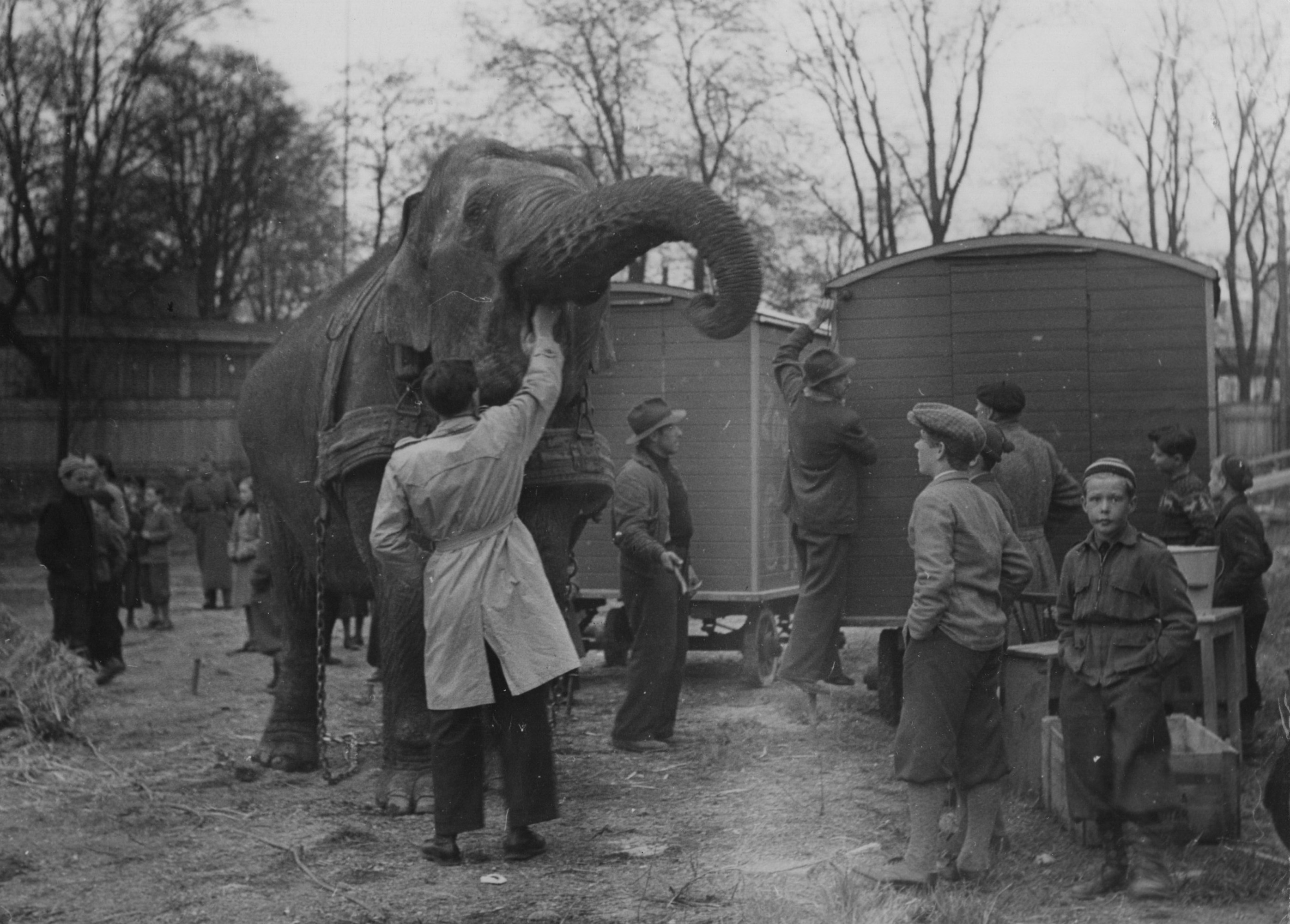
Zoo Circus director Trolle Rhodin feeding an Asian elephant, Stallmästargården, Stockholm

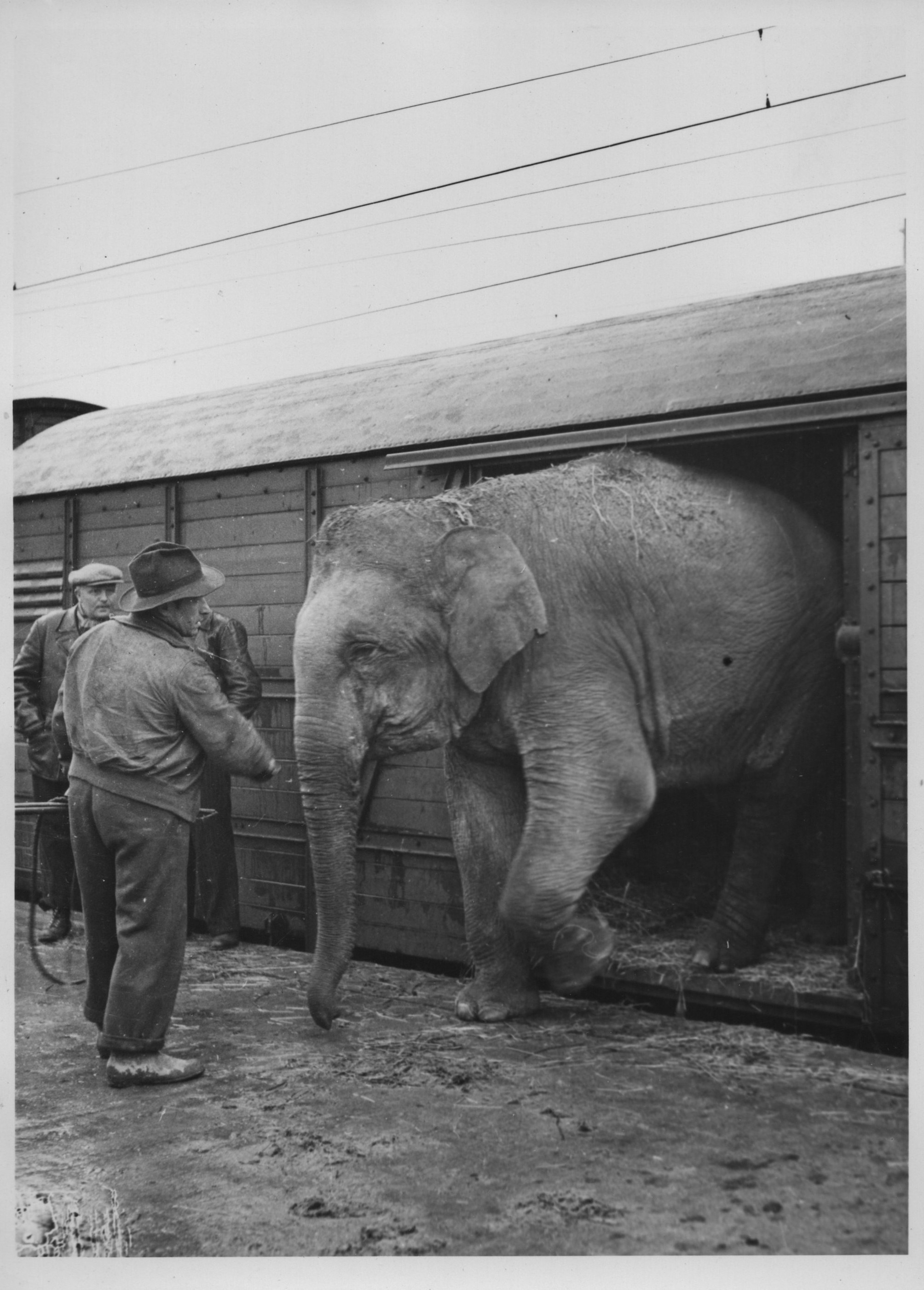
Unloading on Norra Station, Stockholm, 1945

== USA ==
Hugo Schmitt, his assistant Axel Gautier, and the five elephants arrived at Ringling on 20 June 1947. The first came to Pittsburgh. Six days later Ringling's last African forest elephant (Loxodonta cyclotis) named Abele (later called Emily), was bought from Howard Bary in the Belgian Congo, and added to the show, due to Schmitts previous experience with African elephants.

After his arrival to USA, Hugo Schmitt was confronted with post-war anti-German feelings, and later in the autumn Schmitt and his elephants were transferred to Ringling's winter quarters in Sarasota, while the Ringling staff was informed that Schmitt would be in charge of the herd the following season.

From 1948, Hugo Schmitt was responsible for Ringling's 38 current elephants, plus the 5 he brought from Sweden, and in the end of 1950, Hugo's wife Jenny, and their two sons Manfred and Hugh went with the ocean liner "Stockholm", departing from Gothenburg, to New York and America, where they were interned at Ellis Island in New York for about a month, because Jenny Schmitt had worked for a restaurant owned by a Nazi party member. Back in Germany, Lorenz Hagebeck re-establishes his circus in 1949, but due to the post-war economy crisis in Germany, he permanently closes it in 1953, while the Schmitt family started a new life in America.

Hugo Schmitt worked for Ringling Brothers and Barnum & Bailey Circus from 1947 to 1973, but also on other shows such as Mills Bros. Circus 1950–1953, when Schmitt was called upon by President Dwight Eisenhower to wrangle Ringling's elephants in his inaugural parade:

Eisenhower called the Ringlings and requested 'the best elephant trainer in the world' to be a part of his inaugural festivities in 1953," Schmitt said. "The elephant is the Republican party symbol, after all.

— Hugh Schmitt

In 1956 Schmitt was with Leonard Bros. Circus. After the 1955 season with Ringling, he bought his own elephant, a two-year-old Asian elephant named Targa, from Catskill Game Farm. Targa was later sold to Ringling, where she remained for the next 30 years, until she died in 1987.

Schmitt made a brief return to Europe in 1963 when Ringling sent a unit to tour in Britain, and was given the job of handling a group of elephants bought from Chipperfield's Circus. Hugo Schmitt is said to have performed with 55 elephants at one time in the ring at Ringling Brothers and Barnum & Bailey Circus, according to the Guinness World Records.

After Hugo Schmitt retired from touring on the road in 1971, he was replaced as Ringling's elephant superintendent by his former assistant Axel Gautier, who was in charge of the Blue Unit's elephant herd through 1989, while Schmitt was sent to England to fetch a group of baby elephants from Billy Smart's Circus, which he later trained in Ringling's quarters in Venice, Florida. One of the elephants from this group, Gildah, was later sold to German-American magicians and entertainers Siegfried & Roy, for their show in Las Vegas, Nevada.

Hugo Schmitt died of cancer in Sarasota in 1977, shortly after his retirement in Fruitville, Florida, while Axel Gautier was attacked by the elephant Reeba in 1989, and died at Shands Hospital in Gainesville, Florida.

A portion of a letter from the elephant trainer Bill Woodcock to Chappie Fox, in a letter dated June 8, 1961, gives the following statement about Hugo Schmitt:

Very hard to make a comparison of present elephant men with those of the old rail circuses because conditions are different. There are two fine trainers in the U.S. today, Mac MacDonald and Hugo Schmitt. In comparison, the balance are a sorry lot. It is my opinion that Schmitt is by far the best elephant trainer ever employed by the Ringling Show.

— Bill Woodcock

== Family ==
Jenny Schmitt suffered a stroke in 1994, and died in 1999.

1. Hugh Schmitt was born on 26 February 1938 in Hamburg-Stellingen. Hugh has with his wife Louise the two sons Steven and Christopher Schmitt. Hugh also wrote a book called "Life is a Circus - Das Leben Ist Ein Zirkus", which was published in 2003. ISBN 1414040628
2. Manfred Schmitt was born 1942 in Hamburg-Stellingen, and died in 1996. Manfred had the children Deborah and Mark A. Schmitt
3. Eddy Schmitt was born 1956 in Sarasota, had a tiger act for many years with his wife Cheryl. They have two daughters Sarah and Samantha.
4. Hugo's last son Roman Schmitt was born on December 15, 1951, in New Orleans, Louisiana. Growing up at Ringling Bros. and Barnum & Bailey Circus where he worked with his father, Roman become a famous elephant trainer, who trained a group of elephants and a black rhino in Orlando from 1974 to 1983, when Roman almost died after being attacked by an elephant. Later he successfully initiated Busch Gardens Tampa Bays' elephant breeding program, which became the foundation of Ringling's captive elephant breeding program at the Center for Elephant Conservation in Polk City, Florida, which opened in 1995. Roman Schmitt died in May 2001, 49 years old. With his wife Jean, he has two children Ryan Schmitt and Megan Schmitt.
