= Nanstein Castle =

Castle ruin in Rhineland-Palatinate, Germany

- Burg Nanstein (German)
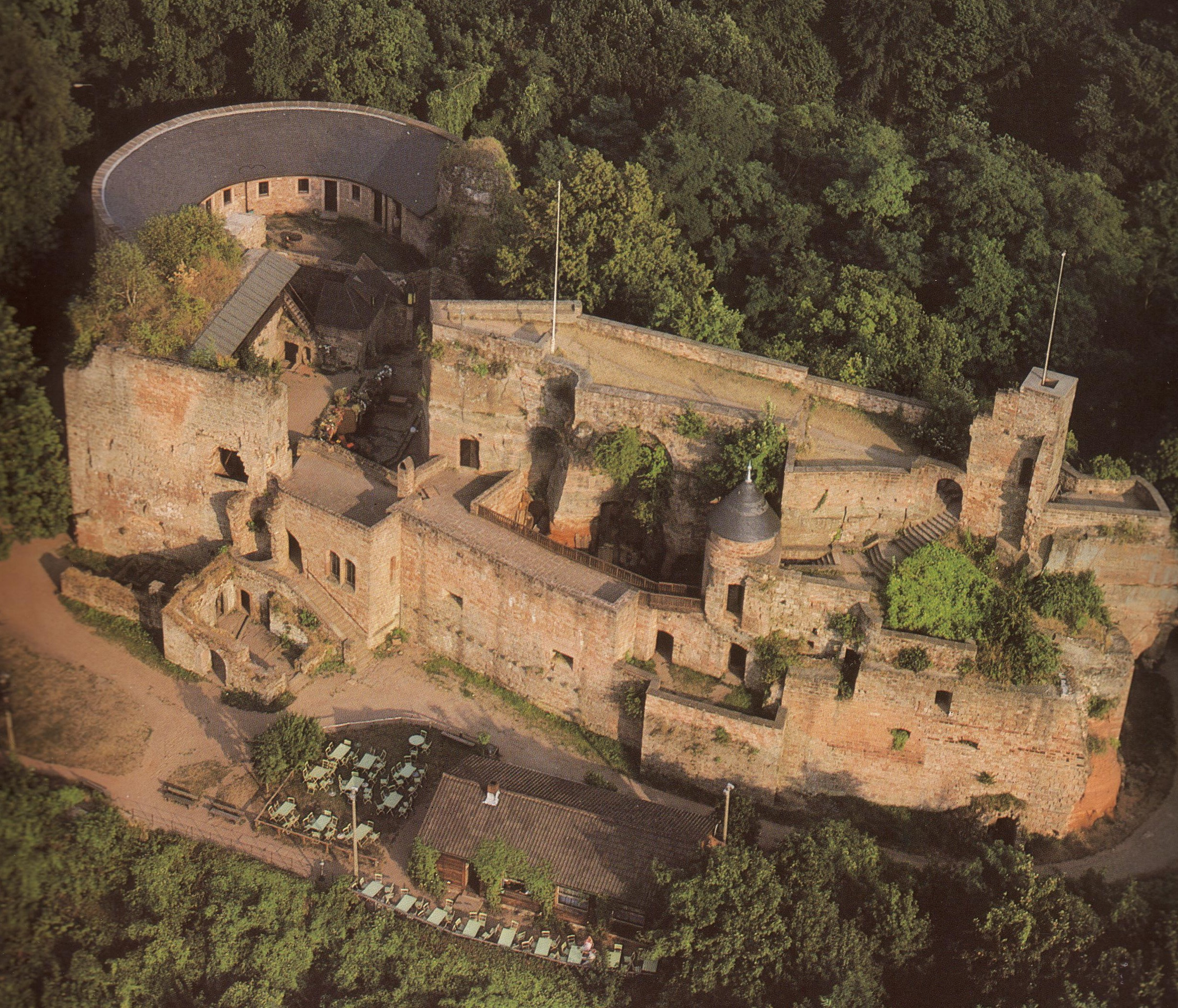
- Ruins of Nanstein Castle

- Location in Germany
- 49°24′35.4″N 7°34′24.9″E
- Location: Burgweg 1, 66849 Landstuhl, Germany

History
- Built: c. 1152
- Built for: Frederick I of Germany

Site notes
- Architectural styles: Gothic, renaissance, other
- Current use: Ruin, tourist attraction, festival hall, music venue, open-air theater, restaurant
- Governing body: Municipal Association of Landstuhl
- Owner: Government of Rhineland-Palatinate
- Website: Nanstein Castle

Nanstein Castle (German: Burg Nanstein) is a ruined medieval spur castle above the town of Landstuhl, Germany, which has been partially reconstructed. Built in the 12th century, the red sandstone rock castle was once owned by Franz von Sickingen who was mortally wounded during a siege of the castle in 1523.

== History ==
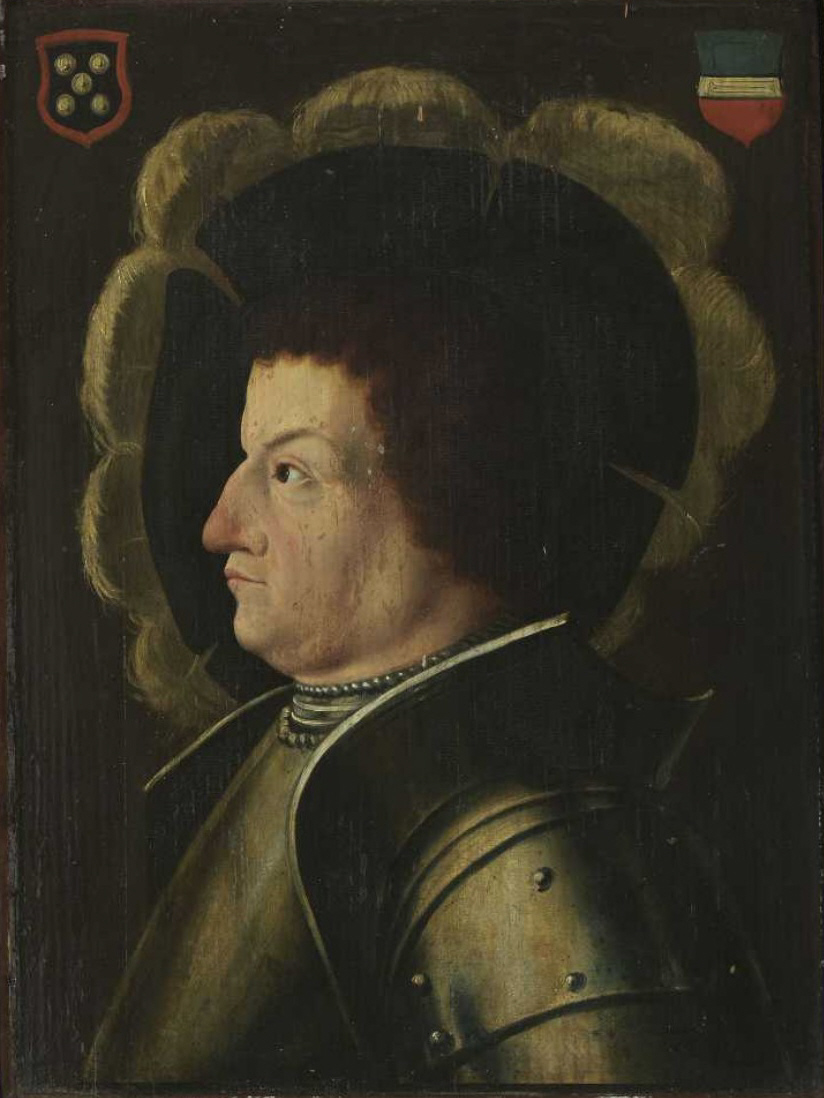
Franz von Sickingen

Frederick I of Germany had Nanstein Castle built about 1152. The medieval hill (spur) castle, situated above a 49 feet (15 m) high sandstone ledge, was originally part of the Hohenstaufen defenses guarding the imperial lands in the south-western Palatinate.

Imperial Knight and Protestant reformer Franz von Sickingen modernized the castle in the 16th century and turned it into a citadel that was supposed to withstand the artillery of the age. In 1523 (during the so-called "Knights' War"), the castle was besieged by the Archbishop of Trier, the Palatine Elector Louis V, and Philip, Landgrave of Hesse. Sickingen fell mortally wounded during the siege.

Sickingen's sons received the partially destroyed castle back from Elector Louis V in 1542 (as a feudal tenure), and immediately rebuilt it in a Renaissance style. In 1668, the Elector Charles Louis captured the restored castle and had it partially destroyed. French troops destroyed other parts in 1689. In the following centuries several repairs were made, but it remains a castle ruin.
