= Sauerthal =

- Municipality
- Coat of arms

- Location of Sauerthal within Rhein-Lahn-Kreis district
- Interactive map of Sauerthal
- Location within Germany Location within Rhineland-Palatinate
- Coordinates: 50°5′9″N 7°49′18″E
- Country: Germany
- State: Rhineland-Palatinate
- District: Rhein-Lahn-Kreis
- Municipal assoc.: Loreley

Government
  - Mayor (2019–24): Stefan Vohs

Area
  - Total: 3.57 km^{2} (1.38 sq mi)
- Elevation: 208 m (682 ft)

Population (2025-12-31)
  - Total: 136
  - Density: 38.1/km^{2} (98.7/sq mi)
- Time zone: UTC+01:00 (CET)
  - Summer (DST): UTC+02:00 (CEST)
- Postal codes: 65391
- Dialling codes: 06726
- Vehicle registration: EMS, DIZ, GOH

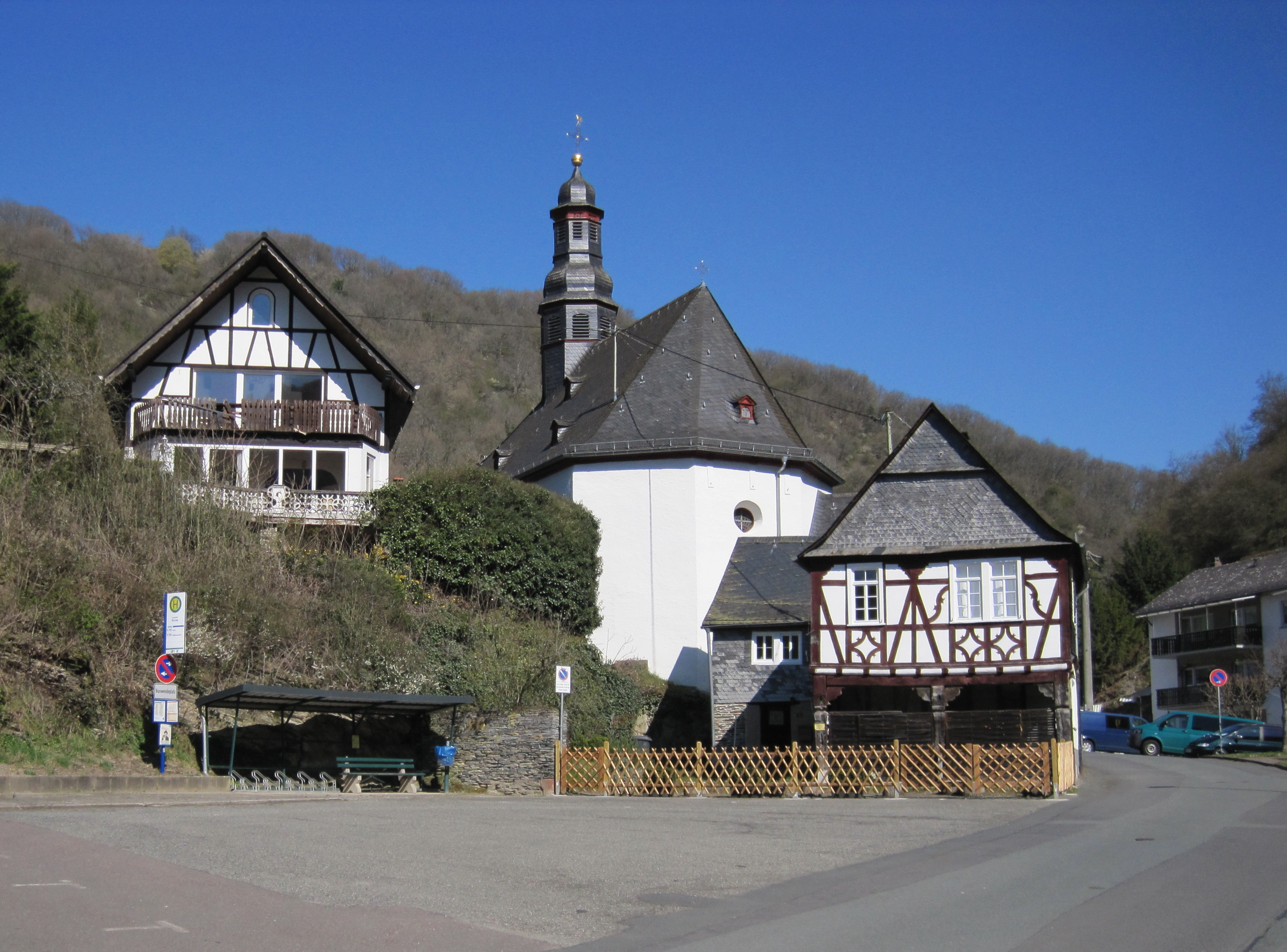
Sauerthal (Rhein-Lahn district

Sauerthal (German pronunciation: [ˈzaʊɐtaːl]) is a municipality in the district of Rhein-Lahn, in Rhineland-Palatinate, in western Germany.
