= Langwieden =

- Municipality
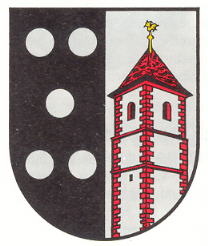
- Coat of arms

- Location of Langwieden within Kaiserslautern district
- Interactive map of Langwieden
- Location within Germany Location within Rhineland-Palatinate
- Coordinates: 49°22′30″N 7°29′56″E
- Country: Germany
- State: Rhineland-Palatinate
- District: Kaiserslautern
- Municipal assoc.: Bruchmühlbach-Miesau

Government
  - Mayor (2019–24): Hannah Havel

Area
  - Total: 7.03 km^{2} (2.71 sq mi)
- Elevation: 403 m (1,322 ft)

Population (2025-12-31)
  - Total: 275
  - Density: 39.1/km^{2} (101/sq mi)
- Time zone: UTC+01:00 (CET)
  - Summer (DST): UTC+02:00 (CEST)
- Postal codes: 66894
- Dialling codes: 06372
- Vehicle registration: KL

Langwieden is a municipality in the district of Kaiserslautern, in Rhineland-Palatinate, western Germany.
