= Bann, Germany =

Bann
- Municipality
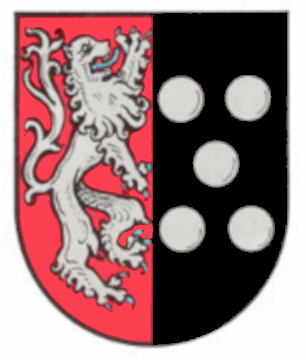
- Coat of arms

- Location of Bann within Kaiserslautern district
- Interactive map of Bann
- Location within Germany Location within Rhineland-Palatinate
- Coordinates: 49°23′28″N 07°36′46″E
- Country: Germany
- State: Rhineland-Palatinate
- District: Kaiserslautern

Government
  - Mayor (2019–24): Michael Klingel (FW)

Area
  - Total: 12.94 km^{2} (5.00 sq mi)
- Elevation: 362 m (1,188 ft)

Population (2025-12-31)
  - Total: 2,214
  - Density: 171.1/km^{2} (443.1/sq mi)
- Time zone: UTC+01:00 (CET)
  - Summer (DST): UTC+02:00 (CEST)
- Postal codes: 66851
- Dialling codes: 06371
- Vehicle registration: KL

Bann (German pronunciation: [ban]) is a municipality in the district of Kaiserslautern, in Rhineland-Palatinate, western Germany. Located in the Steinalb valley with the Palatinate Forest bordering it to the east.

== Vicinity ==
It is located between the hills of Hausberg (474 m), Kahlenberg (464 m) and Kirchberg (423 m) in the Steinalb valley, which separates the Sickingen Heights from the Palatinate Forest.

Through Bann flows a small stream, the Queidersbach, popularly called Steinalb. It rises at the Ziegelsteige on the Sickingerhöhe.

== History ==
Bann was first mentioned in the year 1182 in a document by the Pope.

Until the end of the 18th century the municipality belonged to the so-called Grand Court of the rule Landstuhl, which was owned by the barons of Sickingen the line to Hohenburg.

In 1794, the left bank of the Rhine was occupied in the War of the First Coalition. From 1798 to 1814 Bann belonged to the canton Landstuhl in the department Donnersberg.

Due to the agreements made at the Congress of Vienna, the area first came to Austria in June 1815 and was ceded to the Kingdom of Bavaria in 1816 on the basis of the Treaty of Munich. Under the Bavarian administration Bann belonged from 1817 to the District of Homburg in the Rhine district, from 1862 to the district office Homburg, moved in 1929 to the district office Kaiserslautern and belongs since 1939 to the district of Kaiserslautern.

In 1982, the 800th anniversary of the municipality was celebrated with a big celebration. Amongst other things there was a big historical procession.

== Coat of arms ==
The coat of arms is held in red and black. On the left hand side it shows a lion on a red background and on the right hand side five silver balls on a black background. The lion stands for the former belonging to the county of Homburg (Saar), while the five balls recall to the administration of the Sickingens for many centuries.

== Population growth ==
The development of the population of the municipality Bann, the values from 1871 to 1987 are based on censuses.

Year	Population	Year	Population
1815	415	1961	1,902
1835	611	1970	2,142
1871	636	1987	2,180
1905	882	1997	2,349
1939	1,368	2005	2,355
1950	1,620	2017	2,230

== Sports ==
At the season of 2006/2007 the chess club SC Bann took part in the 1.Schachbundesliga (the highest reachable league of chess in Germany).

== Famous citizens ==
- Elmar Wolf (born 1939; died 2006 in Queidersbach), musician
- Matthias Mayer, drummer of the Heavy Metal-Band "Ross the Boss" set up around former Manowar guitar-player Ross Friedman
- Hugo Schmitt, elephant trainer at Circus Carl Hagenbeck and Ringling Bros. and Barnum & Bailey Circus
- Leo Spielberger, Football Player
