= Martinshöhe =

- Municipality
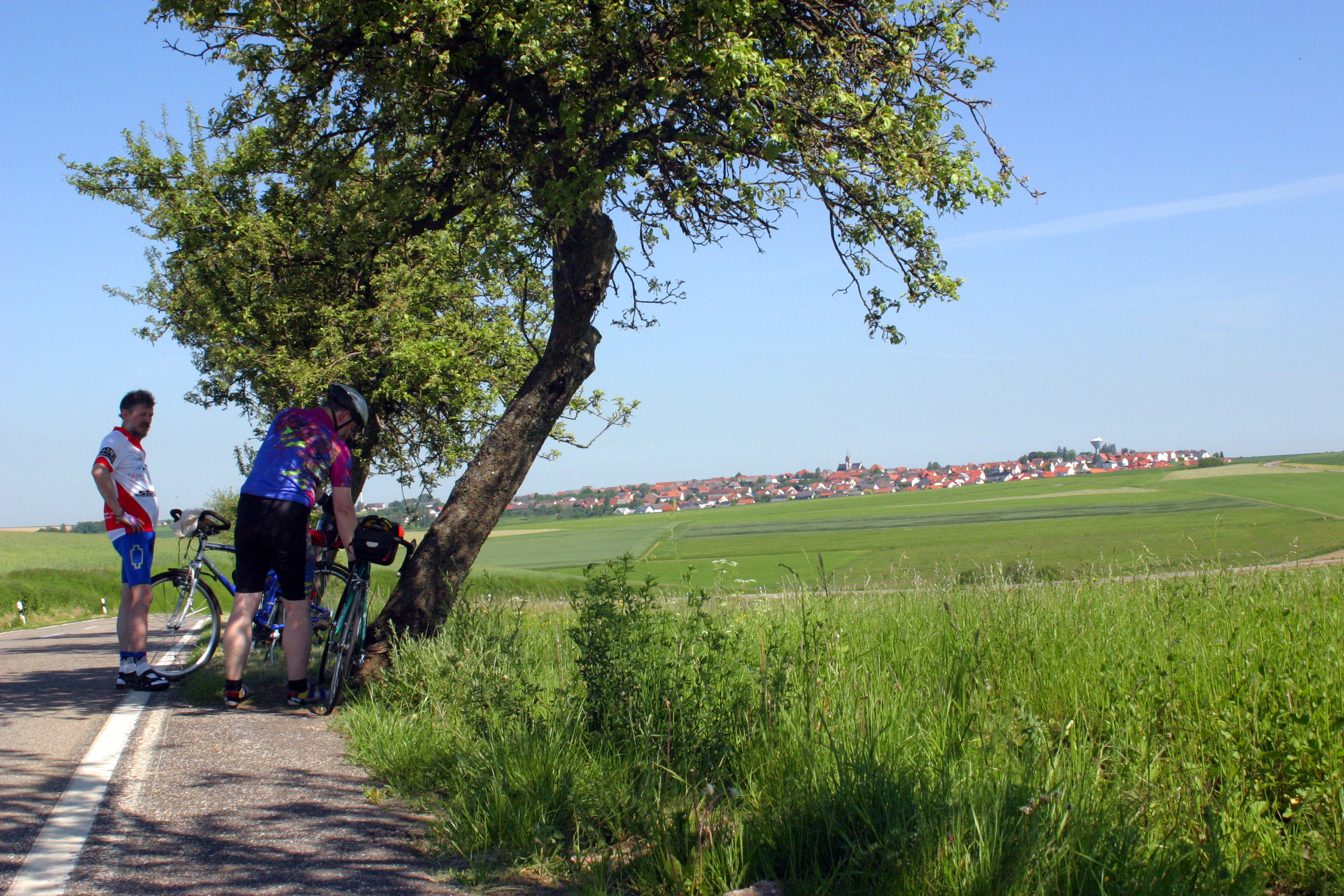

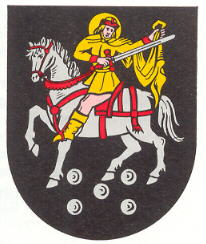
- Coat of arms

- Location of Martinshöhe within Kaiserslautern district
- Interactive map of Martinshöhe
- Location within Germany Location within Rhineland-Palatinate
- Coordinates: 49°21′50″N 7°28′44″E
- Country: Germany
- State: Rhineland-Palatinate
- District: Kaiserslautern
- Municipal assoc.: Bruchmühlbach-Miesau

Government
  - Mayor (2019–24): Hartwig Schneider

Area
  - Total: 10.93 km^{2} (4.22 sq mi)
- Elevation: 403 m (1,322 ft)

Population (2025-12-31)
  - Total: 1,361
  - Density: 124.5/km^{2} (322.5/sq mi)
- Time zone: UTC+01:00 (CET)
  - Summer (DST): UTC+02:00 (CEST)
- Postal codes: 66894
- Dialling codes: 06372
- Vehicle registration: KL

Martinshöhe (German pronunciation: [ˈmaʁtiːnsˌhøːə]) is a municipality in the district of Kaiserslautern, in Rhineland-Palatinate, western Germany.
