= Linden, Kaiserslautern =

Linden
- Municipality
- Coat of arms

- Location of Linden within Kaiserslautern district
- Interactive map of Linden
- Location within Germany Location within Rhineland-Palatinate
- Coordinates: 49°21′07″N 7°38′54″E
- Country: Germany
- State: Rhineland-Palatinate
- District: Kaiserslautern

Government
  - Mayor (2019–24): Nicole Meier (FW)

Area
  - Total: 5.09 km^{2} (1.97 sq mi)
- Elevation: 293 m (961 ft)

Population (2025-12-31)
  - Total: 1,197
  - Density: 235/km^{2} (609/sq mi)
- Time zone: UTC+01:00 (CET)
  - Summer (DST): UTC+02:00 (CEST)
- Postal codes: 66851
- Dialling codes: 06307
- Vehicle registration: KL

Linden (German pronunciation: [ˈlɪndn̩]) is a municipality in the district of Kaiserslautern, in Rhineland-Palatinate, western Germany.

== Geography ==
The community is located on the edge of the biosphere reserve Palatinate Forest. Through Linden flows the Queidersbach, popularly also called Steinalb. Linden also includes the living spaces Ländler-Hof, Lindener Mühle and Weiherhof.

== History ==
The place was first mentioned in documents in 1363.

The village Linden belonged from the early 16th to the end of the 18th century to the so-called Grand Court of the rule Landstuhl, which was owned by the barons of Sickingen the line to Hohenburg.

In 1794, the left bank of the Rhine was occupied in the First Coalition War. From 1798 to 1814 Linden belonged to the canton Landstuhl in the department Donnersberg.

Due to the agreements made at the Congress of Vienna, the area first came to Austria in June 1815 and was ceded to the Kingdom of Bavaria in 1816 on the basis of the Treaty of Munich. Under the Bavarian administration Linden belonged from 1817 to the Landkommissariat Homburg in the Rhine district, from 1862 to the district office Homburg, moved in 1929 to the district office Kaiserslautern and belongs since 1939 to the district of Kaiserslautern.

After the Second World War, the community Linden within the French occupation zone was part of the administrative district Pfalz in the then newly formed state Rhineland-Palatinate.

=== Population growth ===
The development of the population of Linden, the values from 1871 to 1987 are based on censuses:

Year	Population	Year	Population
1815	198	1961	1,100
1835	314	1970	1,268
1871	408	1987	1,206
1905	501	1997	1,321
1939	833	2005	1,194
1950	923	2017	1,145
