= Hauptstuhl =

- Municipality
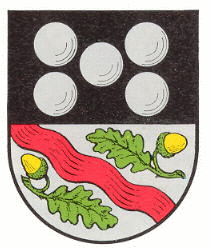
- Coat of arms

- Location of Hauptstuhl within Kaiserslautern district
- Interactive map of Hauptstuhl
- Location within Germany Location within Rhineland-Palatinate
- Coordinates: 49°24′06″N 7°29′27″E
- Country: Germany
- State: Rhineland-Palatinate
- District: Kaiserslautern

Government
  - Mayor (2019–24): Gerald-Frank Bosch (SPD)

Area
  - Total: 5 km^{2} (1.9 sq mi)
- Elevation: 241 m (791 ft)

Population (2025-12-31)
  - Total: 1,182
  - Density: 240/km^{2} (610/sq mi)
- Time zone: UTC+01:00 (CET)
  - Summer (DST): UTC+02:00 (CEST)
- Postal codes: 66851
- Dialling codes: 06372
- Vehicle registration: KL

Hauptstuhl (German pronunciation: [ˈhaʊptʃtuːl]) is a municipality in the district of Kaiserslautern, in Rhineland-Palatinate, western Germany.
