= Stelzenberg =

- Municipality
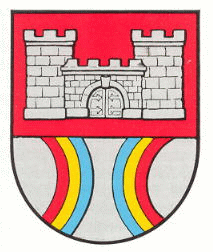
- Coat of arms

- Location of Stelzenberg within Kaiserslautern district
- Interactive map of Stelzenberg
- Location within Germany Location within Rhineland-Palatinate
- Coordinates: 49°22′48″N 7°44′28″E
- Country: Germany
- State: Rhineland-Palatinate
- District: Kaiserslautern

Government
  - Mayor (2019–24): Fritz Geib (FW)

Area
  - Total: 9.24 km^{2} (3.57 sq mi)
- Elevation: 375 m (1,230 ft)

Population (2025-12-31)
  - Total: 1,229
  - Density: 133/km^{2} (344/sq mi)
- Time zone: UTC+01:00 (CET)
  - Summer (DST): UTC+02:00 (CEST)
- Postal codes: 67705
- Dialling codes: 06306
- Vehicle registration: KL
- Website: www.stelzenberg.de

Stelzenberg (German pronunciation: [ˈʃtɛltsn̩bɛʁk]) is a municipality in the district of Kaiserslautern, in Rhineland-Palatinate, western Germany.
