= Landstuhl =

Town in Rhineland-Palatinate, Germany

- Town
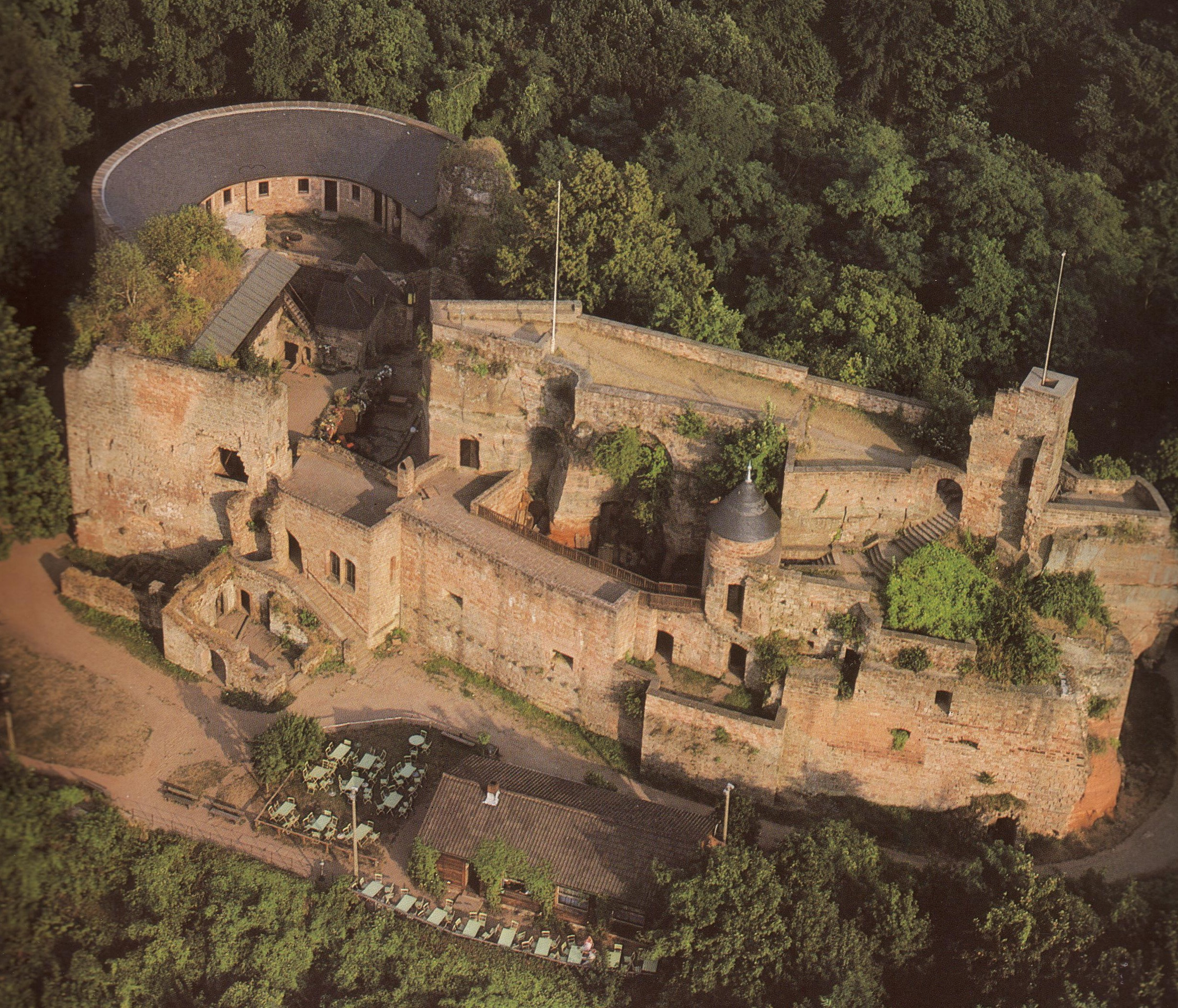
- Ruins of Nanstein Castle

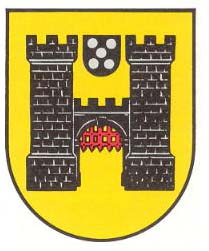
- Coat of arms

- Location of Landstuhl within Kaiserslautern district
- Interactive map of Landstuhl
- Location within Germany Location within Rhineland-Palatinate
- Coordinates: 49°24′44″N 07°34′20″E
- Country: Germany
- State: Rhineland-Palatinate
- District: Kaiserslautern
- First mentioned: 1323 (703 years ago)

Government
  - Mayor (2024–present): Mattia De Fazio (CDU)

Area
  - Total: 15.34 km^{2} (5.92 sq mi)
- Elevation: 248 m (814 ft)

Population (2025-12-31)
  - Total: 8,353
  - Density: 544.5/km^{2} (1,410/sq mi)
- Time zone: UTC+01:00 (CET)
  - Summer (DST): UTC+02:00 (CEST)
- Postal codes: 66849
- Dialling codes: 06371
- Vehicle registration: KL
- Website: landstuhl.de

Landstuhl (German pronunciation: [ˈlantʃtuːl]), officially the Sickingen Town of Landstuhl (German: Sickingenstadt Landstuhl), is a town in the district of Kaiserslautern, in Rhineland-Palatinate, Germany. It is the seat of the Municipal Association of Landstuhl. Situated on the north-west edge of the Palatinate Forest, 11 miles (18 km) west of the city of Kaiserslautern, the town is located near Ramstein Air Base.

== History ==
=== Early history ===
The earliest traces of human settlement in Landstuhl date from around 500 BC. The "heathen rock" (Heidenfels) from the Celtic period was a holy site until Roman times, and a Roman settlement dates from the 1st century. About 1152, Emperor Frederick I had Nanstein Castle built on the mountain south of town.

=== Early Modern period ===
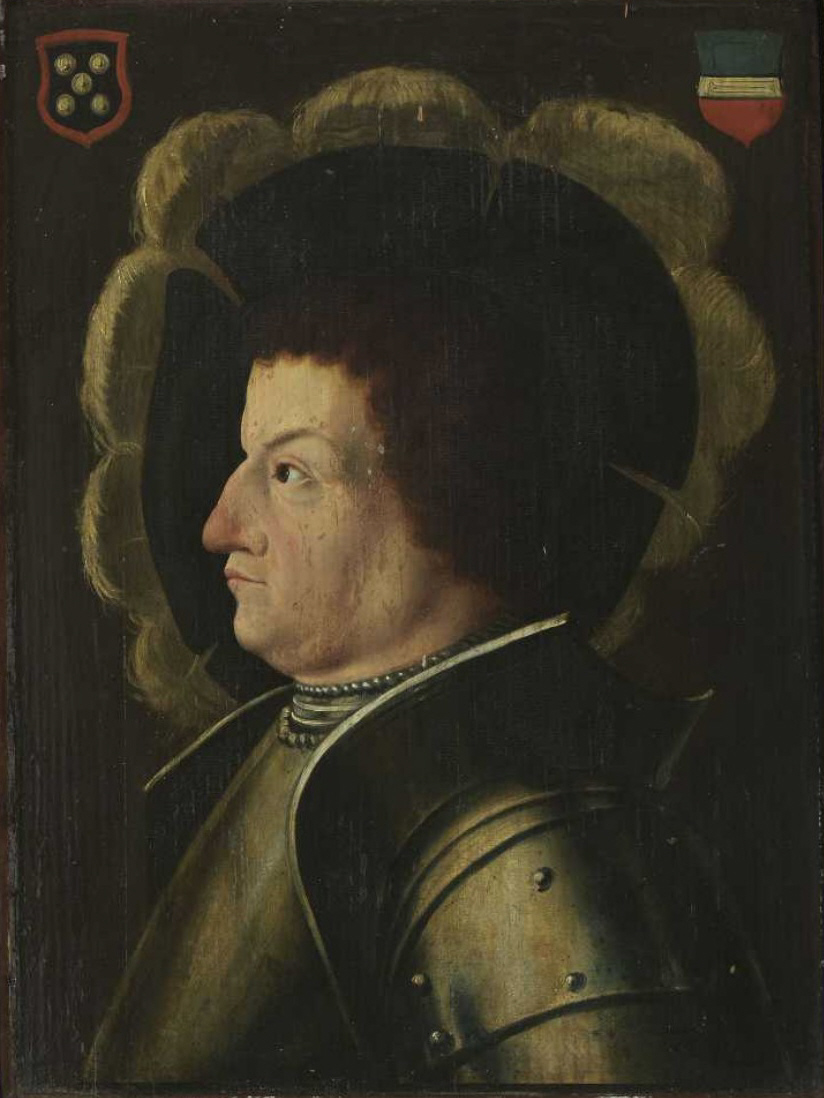
Franz von Sickingen

During the 15th century, the lords of Sickingen assumed responsibility for Landstuhl and the surrounding area. The most famous member of this dynasty was Franz von Sickingen. He converted the castle – Nanstein Castle (German: Burg Nanstein), the most visible landmark in Landstuhl and the surrounding area – into a dominating fortress. In August 1522, Sickingen moved to further expand his feudal domains by capturing Trier. After several unsuccessful attempts to lay siege to the city, he withdrew to Nanstein Castle and was subsequently besieged by a coalition of Richard, Archbishop of Trier; Louis V, Elector Palatine; and Philip I, Landgrave of Hesse. During the 1523 siege of Nanstein Castle, Sickingen fell mortally wounded. His sons rebuilt the castle in Renaissance style, but it was largely destroyed by Louis XIV's army during the Rhine campaign of the Nine Years' War.

== Politics ==
Landstuhl's mayor is Mattia De Fazio, who was elected in August 2024. De Fazio is a member of the CDU.

== Economy and infrastructure ==
Landstuhl is home to Landstuhl Hospital, also known as Landstuhl Regional Medical Center, a U.S. Army installation atop the Kirchberg.

== Notable people ==
- Aaron Altherr – German-American baseball player
- Shawn Bradley – German-American basketball player
- LeVar Burton – American actor
- Shelley FKA DRAM – American musician
- David Rouzer – American politician
- Franz von Sickingen – German knight
- Rob Thomas – American musician
- Reggie Williams – American football player

== International relations ==
Landstuhl is twinned with:

- Pont-à-Mousson, France (1967)
- Bad Münster am Stein-Ebernburg, Germany (1998)
