= Krickenbach =

- Municipality
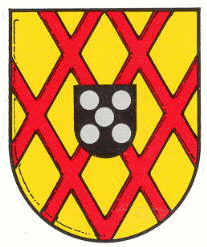
- Coat of arms

- Location of Krickenbach within Kaiserslautern district
- Interactive map of Krickenbach
- Location within Germany Location within Rhineland-Palatinate
- Coordinates: 49°21′50″N 7°40′07″E
- Country: Germany
- State: Rhineland-Palatinate
- District: Kaiserslautern

Government
  - Mayor (2019–24): Uwe Vatter (FW)

Area
  - Total: 10.03 km^{2} (3.87 sq mi)
- Elevation: 333 m (1,093 ft)

Population (2025-12-31)
  - Total: 1,189
  - Density: 118.5/km^{2} (307.0/sq mi)
- Time zone: UTC+01:00 (CET)
  - Summer (DST): UTC+02:00 (CEST)
- Postal codes: 67706
- Dialling codes: 06307
- Vehicle registration: KL
- Website: www.krickenbach.de

Krickenbach (German pronunciation: [ˈkʁɪkn̩bax]) is a municipality in the district of Kaiserslautern, in Rhineland-Palatinate, western Germany.
