= Pirmasens (electoral district) =

Federal electoral district of Germany

209 Pirmasens
- Electoral district for the Bundestag
- Pirmasens in 2025
- State: Rhineland-Palatinate
- Population: 222,700 (2019)
- Electorate: 167,724 (2025)
- Major settlements: Pirmasens; Zweibrücken; Landstuhl
- Area: 1,388.1 km^{2}

Current electoral district
- Created: 1949
- Party: CDU
- Member: Florian Bilic
- Elected: 2025

Pirmasens is an electoral constituency (German: Wahlkreis) represented in the Bundestag. It elects one member via first-past-the-post voting. Under the current constituency numbering system, it is designated as constituency 209. It is located in southern Rhineland-Palatinate, comprising the cities of Pirmasens and Zweibrücken, the Südwestpfalz district, and the southwestern part of the Landkreis Kaiserslautern district.

Pirmasens was created for the inaugural 1949 federal election. Since 2025, it has been represented by Florian Bilic of the Christian Democratic Union of Germany (CDU).

== Geography ==
Pirmasens is located in southern Rhineland-Palatinate. As of the 2021 federal election, it comprises the independent cities of Pirmasens and Zweibrücken, the district of Südwestpfalz, and the Verbandsgemeinden of Bruchmühlbach-Miesau, Landstuhl, and Ramstein-Miesenbach from the Landkreis Kaiserslautern district.

== History ==
Pirmasens was created in 1949, then known as Zweibrücken. It acquired its current name in the 1965 election. In the 1949 election, it was Rhineland-Palatinate constituency 14 in the numbering system. In the 1953 through 1961 elections, it was number 161. In the 1965 through 1976 elections, it was number 162. In the 1980 through 1998 elections, it was number 160. In the 2002 election, it was number 213. In the 2005 election, it was number 212. In the 2009 and 2013 elections, it was number 211. In the 2017 and 2021 elections, it was number 210. From the 2025 election, it has been number 209.

Originally, the constituency comprised the cities of Pirmasens and Zweibrücken and the districts of Landkreis Pirmasens, Landkreis Zweibrücken, and Bergzabern. In the 1965 and 1969 elections, it comprised the cities of Pirmasens and Zweibrücken and the districts of Landkreis Pirmasens and Landkreis Zweibrücken. In the 1972 through 1998 elections, it comprised the cities of Pirmasens and Zweibrücken and the Landkreis Pirmasens district. It acquired its current borders in the 2002 election.

Election	No.	Name	Borders
1949	14	Zweibrücken	Pirmasens city; Zweibrücken city; Landkreis Pirmasens district; Landkreis Zweibrücken district; Bergzabern district
1953	161	Zweibrücken	Pirmasens city; Zweibrücken city; Landkreis Pirmasens district; Landkreis Zweibrücken district; Bergzabern district
1957	161	Zweibrücken	Pirmasens city; Zweibrücken city; Landkreis Pirmasens district; Landkreis Zweibrücken district; Bergzabern district
1961	161	Zweibrücken	Pirmasens city; Zweibrücken city; Landkreis Pirmasens district; Landkreis Zweibrücken district; Bergzabern district
1965	162	Pirmasens	Pirmasens city; Zweibrücken city; Landkreis Pirmasens district; Landkreis Zweibrücken district
1969	162	Pirmasens	Pirmasens city; Zweibrücken city; Landkreis Pirmasens district; Landkreis Zweibrücken district
1972	162	Pirmasens	Pirmasens city; Zweibrücken city; Landkreis Pirmasens district
1976	162	Pirmasens	Pirmasens city; Zweibrücken city; Landkreis Pirmasens district
1980	160	Pirmasens	Pirmasens city; Zweibrücken city; Landkreis Pirmasens district
1983	160	Pirmasens	Pirmasens city; Zweibrücken city; Landkreis Pirmasens district
1987	160	Pirmasens	Pirmasens city; Zweibrücken city; Landkreis Pirmasens district
1990	160	Pirmasens	Pirmasens city; Zweibrücken city; Landkreis Pirmasens district
1994	160	Pirmasens	Pirmasens city; Zweibrücken city; Landkreis Pirmasens district
1998	160	Pirmasens	Pirmasens city; Zweibrücken city; Landkreis Pirmasens district
2002	213	Pirmasens	Pirmasens city; Zweibrücken city; Südwestpfalz district; Landkreis Kaiserslautern district (only Bruchmühlbach-Miesau, Landstuhl, and Ramstein-Miesenbach Verbandsgemeinden)
2005	212	Pirmasens	Pirmasens city; Zweibrücken city; Südwestpfalz district; Landkreis Kaiserslautern district (only Bruchmühlbach-Miesau, Landstuhl, and Ramstein-Miesenbach Verbandsgemeinden)
2009	211	Pirmasens	Pirmasens city; Zweibrücken city; Südwestpfalz district; Landkreis Kaiserslautern district (only Bruchmühlbach-Miesau, Landstuhl, and Ramstein-Miesenbach Verbandsgemeinden)
2013	211	Pirmasens	Pirmasens city; Zweibrücken city; Südwestpfalz district; Landkreis Kaiserslautern district (only Bruchmühlbach-Miesau, Landstuhl, and Ramstein-Miesenbach Verbandsgemeinden)
2017	210	Pirmasens	Pirmasens city; Zweibrücken city; Südwestpfalz district; Landkreis Kaiserslautern district (only Bruchmühlbach-Miesau, Landstuhl, and Ramstein-Miesenbach Verbandsgemeinden)
2021	210	Pirmasens	Pirmasens city; Zweibrücken city; Südwestpfalz district; Landkreis Kaiserslautern district (only Bruchmühlbach-Miesau, Landstuhl, and Ramstein-Miesenbach Verbandsgemeinden)
2025	209	Pirmasens	Pirmasens city; Zweibrücken city; Südwestpfalz district; Landkreis Kaiserslautern district (only Bruchmühlbach-Miesau, Landstuhl, and Ramstein-Miesenbach Verbandsgemeinden)

== Members ==
The constituency has been held by the Christian Democratic Union (CDU) during all but one Bundestag term since its creation. It was first represented by Josef Becker from 1949 to 1972. Werner Marx served from 1972 to 1987, followed by Klaus-Dieter Uelhoff until 1998. Lydia Westrich of the Social Democratic Party (SPD) was elected in 1998 and served a single term. Anita Schäfer was elected in 2002, and re-elected in 2005, 2009, 2013, and 2017. Angelika Glöckner won the constituency for the SPD in 2021, but was succeeded by Florian Bilic of the CDU in 2025.

Election	Member	Party	%
1949	Josef Becker	CDU	46.6
1953	Josef Becker	CDU	49.0
1957	Josef Becker	CDU	52.1
1961	Josef Becker	CDU	46.4
1965	Josef Becker	CDU	48.6
1969	Josef Becker	CDU	47.1
1972	Werner Marx	CDU	47.2
1976	Werner Marx	CDU	51.6
1980	Werner Marx	CDU	49.8
1983	Werner Marx	CDU	53.8
1987	Klaus-Dieter Uelhoff	CDU	49.2
1990	Klaus-Dieter Uelhoff	CDU	46.3
1994	Klaus-Dieter Uelhoff	CDU	44.9
1998	Lydia Westrich	SPD	45.7
2002	Anita Schäfer	CDU	45.1
2005	Anita Schäfer	CDU	42.4
2009	Anita Schäfer	CDU	39.4
2013	Anita Schäfer	CDU	45.9
2017	Anita Schäfer	CDU	36.8
2021	Angelika Glöckner	SPD	30.4
2025	Florian Bilic	CDU	33.3

== Election results ==
=== 2025 election ===
Federal election (2025): Pirmasens
Notes:	Blue background denotes the winner of the electorate vote. Pink background denotes a candidate elected from their party list. Yellow background denotes an electorate win by a list member, or other incumbent. A ✓ or ✗ denotes status of any incumbent, win or lose respectively.						
Party	Candidate	Votes	%	±%	Party votes	%	±%
CDU	Florian Bilic	45,682	33.3	▲3.2	41,657	30.3	▲4.6
AfD	Iris Nieland	34,424	25.1	▲12.4	37,286	27.1	▲13.9
SPD	✗ Angelika Glöckner	28,474	20.7	▼9.7	23,976	17.4	▼11.9
Greens	Dominik Fey	6,112	4.5	▼1.6	8,138	5.9	▼1.6
BSW	Peter Kalmes	4,827	3.5	New	6,903	5.0	New
Left	Daniel Melzel	4,924	3.6	▲0.8	6,594	4.8	▲1.6
FDP	Anne Oberle	4,078	3.0	▼4.6	5,666	4.1	▼6.9
FW	Jens Specht	4,632	3.4	▼1.2	2,903	2.1	▼1.7
Tierschutzpartei	Barbara Schwarz	3,840	2.8	▲0.3	2,888	2.1	▼0.4
PARTEI					636	0.5	▼0.7
Volt					607	0.4	▲0.1
BD	Heinz Berta	234	0.2	New	249	0.2	New
ÖDP					150	0.1	0.0
MLPD					31	<0.1	0.0
Informal votes		1,840			1,383		
Total valid votes		137,227			137,684		
Turnout		139,067	82.9	▲6.8			
CDU gain from SPD	Majority	11,258	8.2	N/A			

=== 2021 election ===
Federal election (2021): Pirmasens
Notes:	Blue background denotes the winner of the electorate vote. Pink background denotes a candidate elected from their party list. Yellow background denotes an electorate win by a list member, or other incumbent. A ✓ or ✗ denotes status of any incumbent, win or lose respectively.						
Party	Candidate	Votes	%	±%	Party votes	%	±%
SPD	Angelika Glöckner	39,711	30.4	▲1.7	38,261	29.3	▲4.6
CDU	Florian Bilic	39,236	30.1	▼6.8	33,507	25.6	▼10.1
AfD	Ferdinand L. Weber	16,512	12.7	▼0.2	17,178	13.1	▼0.9
FDP	Erike Watson	9,895	7.6	▲0.9	14,374	11.0	▲2.1
Greens	Susanne Bendig	7,891	6.0	▲1.8	9,877	7.6	▲2.9
FW	Roswitha Jeckel	5,990	4.6	▲2.0	4,935	3.8	▲2.0
Left	Frank Eschrich	3,678	2.8	▼3.2	4,207	3.2	▼3.9
Tierschutzpartei	Barbara Schwarz	3,271	2.5		3,325	2.5	
PARTEI	Marc-Oliver Riedinger	1,999	1.5	▲0.1	1,496	1.1	0.0
dieBasis	Klaus Dietrich	1,654	1.3		1,584	1.2	
Pirates					489	0.4	▼0.1
Volt	Andreas Winkler	466	0.4		425	0.3	
NPD					286	0.2	▼0.4
Team Todenhöfer					221	0.2	
Independent	Verena Hofmann	163	0.1				
ÖDP					154	0.1	▼0.1
V-Partei3					114	0.1	▼0.2
Humanists					105	0.1	
DiB					107	0.1	
LKR					48	0.0	
MLPD					30	0.0	0.0
Informal votes		2,004			1,747		
Total valid votes		130,466			130,723		
Turnout		132,470	76.1	▲0.1			
SPD gain from CDU	Majority	475	0.3				

=== 2017 election ===
Federal election (2017): Pirmasens
Notes:	Blue background denotes the winner of the electorate vote. Pink background denotes a candidate elected from their party list. Yellow background denotes an electorate win by a list member, or other incumbent. A ✓ or ✗ denotes status of any incumbent, win or lose respectively.						
Party	Candidate	Votes	%	±%	Party votes	%	±%
CDU	✓ Anita Schäfer	48,719	36.8	▼9.0	47,455	35.8	▼7.9
SPD	Angelika Glöckner	38,028	28.8	▼3.5	32,794	24.7	▼3.2
AfD	Ferdinand Ludwig Weber	16,989	12.8		18,652	14.1	▲9.7
FDP	Sebastian Schäfer	8,846	6.7	▲3.9	11,803	8.9	▲3.8
Left	Brigitte Freihold	8,019	6.1	▲0.1	9,511	7.2	▲0.7
Greens	Felix Schmidt	5,544	4.2	▲0.1	6,156	4.6	▼0.1
FW	Martin Eichert	3,430	2.6	▼0.3	2,388	1.8	▲0.2
PARTEI	Aaron Bastian Schmidt	1,889	1.4		1,573	1.2	
NPD	Markus Walter	771	0.6	▼1.4	833	0.6	▼1.1
Pirates					628	0.5	▼2.0
V-Partei³					391	0.3	
ÖDP					264	0.2	0.0
BGE					223	0.2	
MLPD					45	0.0	0.0
Informal votes		2,830			2,349		
Total valid votes		132,235			132,716		
Turnout		135,065	76.0	▲4.7			
CDU hold	Majority	10,691	8.0	▼5.7			

=== 2013 election ===
Federal election (2013): Pirmasens
Notes:	Blue background denotes the winner of the electorate vote. Pink background denotes a candidate elected from their party list. Yellow background denotes an electorate win by a list member, or other incumbent. A ✓ or ✗ denotes status of any incumbent, win or lose respectively.						
Party	Candidate	Votes	%	±%	Party votes	%	±%
CDU	✓ Anita Schäfer	57,201	45.9	▲6.5	54,877	43.7	▲9.2
SPD	Angelika Glöckner (Note: Glöckner entered the Bundestag on the SPD list after the resignation of Sabine Bätzing-Lichtenthäler in November 2014.)	40,180	32.2	▲5.2	35,108	28.0	▲5.3
Left	Frank Eschrich	7,486	6.0	▼6.6	8,172	6.5	▼6.8
Greens	Felix Schmidt	5,059	4.1	▼2.9	5,960	4.7	▼1.9
FW	Martin Eichert	3,625	2.9		2,046	1.6	
FDP	Steven Wink	3,446	2.8	▼8.4	6,344	5.1	▼10.3
AfD					5,461	4.3	
Pirates	Birgit Wenzel	3,326	2.7		3,061	2.4	▲0.4
NPD	Ricarda Riefling	2,429	1.9	▼0.9	2,178	1.7	▼0.2
REP	Heinz Karl Hinkel	1,916	1.5		1,313	1.0	▼0.3
Party of Reason					483	0.4	
PRO					282	0.2	
ÖDP					267	0.2	▼0.1
MLPD					42	0.0	0.0
Informal votes		4,085			3,159		
Total valid votes		124,668			125,594		
Turnout		128,753	71.3	▲0.2			
CDU hold	Majority	17,021	13.7	▲1.4			

=== 2009 election ===
Federal election (2009): Pirmasens
Notes:	Blue background denotes the winner of the electorate vote. Pink background denotes a candidate elected from their party list. Yellow background denotes an electorate win by a list member, or other incumbent. A ✓ or ✗ denotes status of any incumbent, win or lose respectively.						
Party	Candidate	Votes	%	±%	Party votes	%	±%
CDU	✓ Anita Schäfer	50,035	39.4	▼3.0	44,143	34.5	▼2.4
SPD	Sabine Wilhelm	34,342	27.1	▼9.5	28,982	22.7	▼9.7
Left	Frank Eschrich	15,989	12.6	▲4.4	16,977	13.3	▲4.7
FDP	Heinz-Walter Roth	14,105	11.1	▲4.9	19,605	15.3	▲4.7
Greens	Fred Konrad	8,840	7.0	▲3.7	8,528	6.7	▲1.6
Pirates					2,561	2.0	
NPD	Markus Walter	3,598	2.8	▼0.4	2,533	2.0	▼0.2
FAMILIE					1,945	1.5	▼0.1
REP					1,662	1.3	▼0.8
ÖDP					391	0.3	
PBC					387	0.3	▼0.1
DVU					114	0.1	
MLPD					32	0.0	0.0
Informal votes		4,156			3,205		
Total valid votes		126,909			127,860		
Turnout		131,065	71.1	▼6.8			
CDU hold	Majority	15,963	12.3	▲6.5			

=== 2005 election ===
Federal election (2005):Pirmasens
Notes:	Blue background denotes the winner of the electorate vote. Pink background denotes a candidate elected from their party list. Yellow background denotes an electorate win by a list member, or other incumbent. A ✓ or ✗ denotes status of any incumbent, win or lose respectively.						
Party	Candidate	Votes	%	±%	Party votes	%	±%
CDU	✓ Anita Schäfer	59,788	42.4	▼2.7	52,408	37.0	▼5.1
SPD	Lydia Westrich	51,556	36.6	▼5.3	45,927	32.4	▼4.9
Left	Frank Eschrich	11,572	8.2	▲6.2	12,199	8.6	▲7.5
FDP	Bernd Kaufmann	8,801	6.2	▼1.0	15,082	10.6	▲2.1
NPD	Sascha Wagner	4,624	3.3		3,023	2.1	▲1.5
Greens	Barbara Metzger	4,550	3.2	▼0.4	7,226	5.1	▼0.6
REP					3,005	2.1	0.0
Familie					2,307	1.6	
PBC					551	0.4	▼0.1
MLPD					102	0.1	
Informal votes		5,350			4,411		
Total valid votes		140,891			141,830		
Turnout		146,241	78.0	▼1.1			
CDU hold	Majority	8,232	5.8				
