= Florian Bilic =

German politician (born 1994)

Member of the Bundestag
- Assuming office 25 March 2025
- Succeeding: Angelika Glöckner
- Constituency: Pirmasens

Personal details
- Born: 10 January 1994 (age 32)
- Party: Christian Democratic Union

Florian Bilic (born 10 January 1994) is a German politician who was elected as a member of the Bundestag in 2025. He has served as city councillor of Pirmasens since 2019.

== Political career ==
Between 2018 and 2023 Bilic was a consultant at chamber of commerce and industry for the Palatinite (German: IHK Pfalz) for several political and economic issues. Since 2023 Bilic has been the managing director of business at the Palatine Forest Club. Bilic first ran to be a member of the Bundestag in 2021, when he lost the seat to Angelika Glöckner by 0.3%.
