= Heinrich Bürkel =

German painter

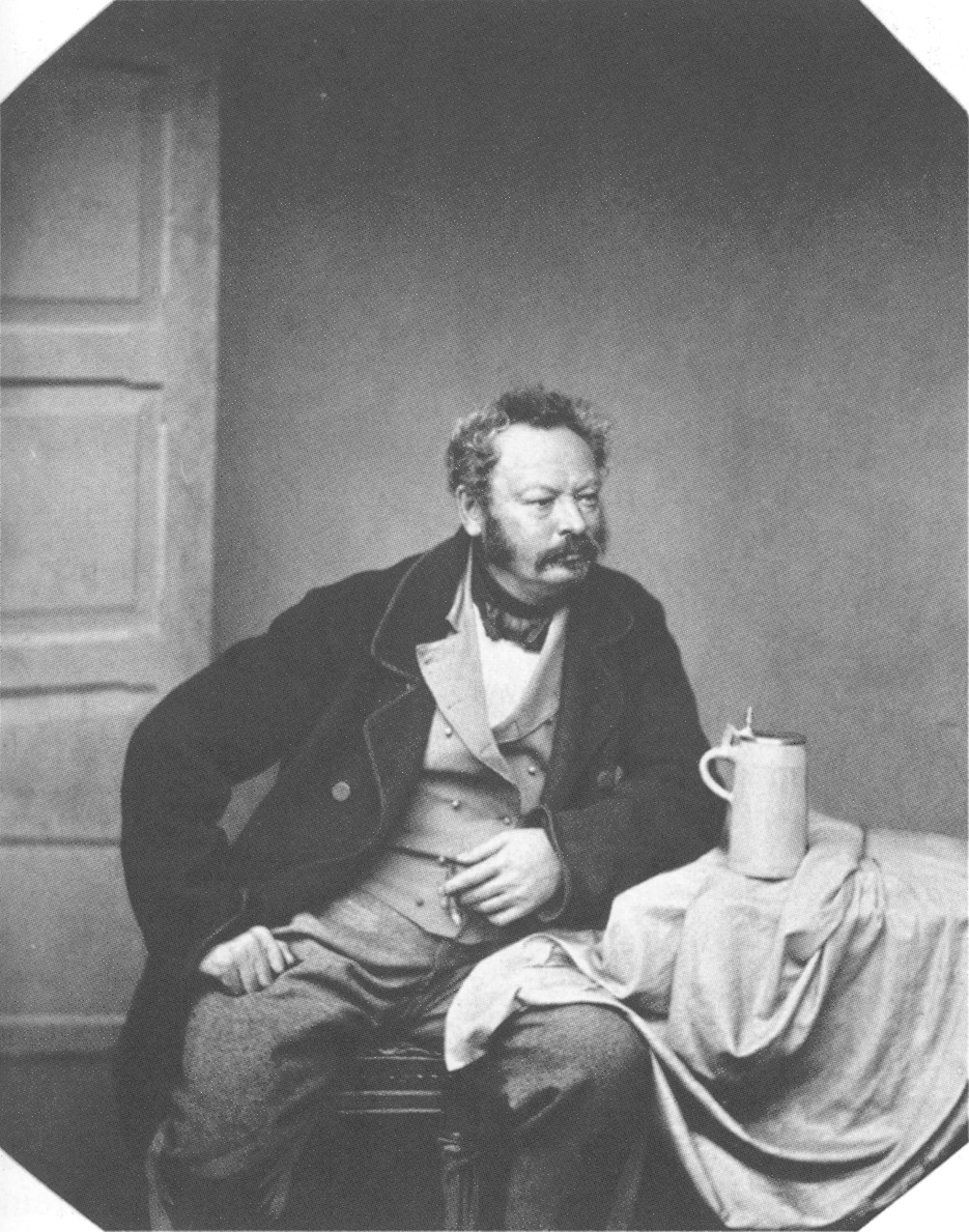
Portrait of Bürkel by Franz Hanfstaengl, ca. 1856

Heinrich Bürkel (1802–1869) was a German genre and landscape painter

== Life ==
Bürkel was born in Pirmasens, in Rhenish Bavaria. He was designed for trade, but devoted every spare minute to drawing. His father's house, being an inn, presented him with subjects in great variety, and so early as his eleventh year he came into conflict with the police on account of a caricature of Napoleon. At fifteen he entered the law, but at twenty he was incited to turn to art, and learned the technicalities of oil painting among friends at Munich, Schleissheim, and in the Netherlands. In time he took to depicting popular and military scenes, cattle, and landscapes, especially winter landscapes. He spent from 1823 to 1832 in Rome, and became on his return a popular artist, famous for his imagination and humour. He was an honorary member of the Academies of Munich, Dresden, and Vienna. He died in Munich in 1869.

== Works ==
His works include:

- Twenty Winter Landscapes in the Tyrol (Paris Exhibition, 1867).
- Eighteen Views of the Environs of Rome (Paris Exhibition, 1867).
- A Troop of Bandits in the Campagna.
- The Overturned Hay-Waggon.
- Return from the Bear-Hunt.
- The Mule-Driver's Rest.
- The Reception of the Rifle-Winner.
- Italian Landscape and others (in the New Pinakothek, Munich).
- A Tirolese Fair (in the Berlin Gallery).
- Landscape near Velletri (in the Berlin Gallery).

In July 2010, three paintings by Buerkel, "Herd of Cattle," "From the Countryside" and an untitled third painting were returned to the Pirmasens Museum in Germany by U.S. Immigration and Customs Enforcement.

== Selected paintings ==
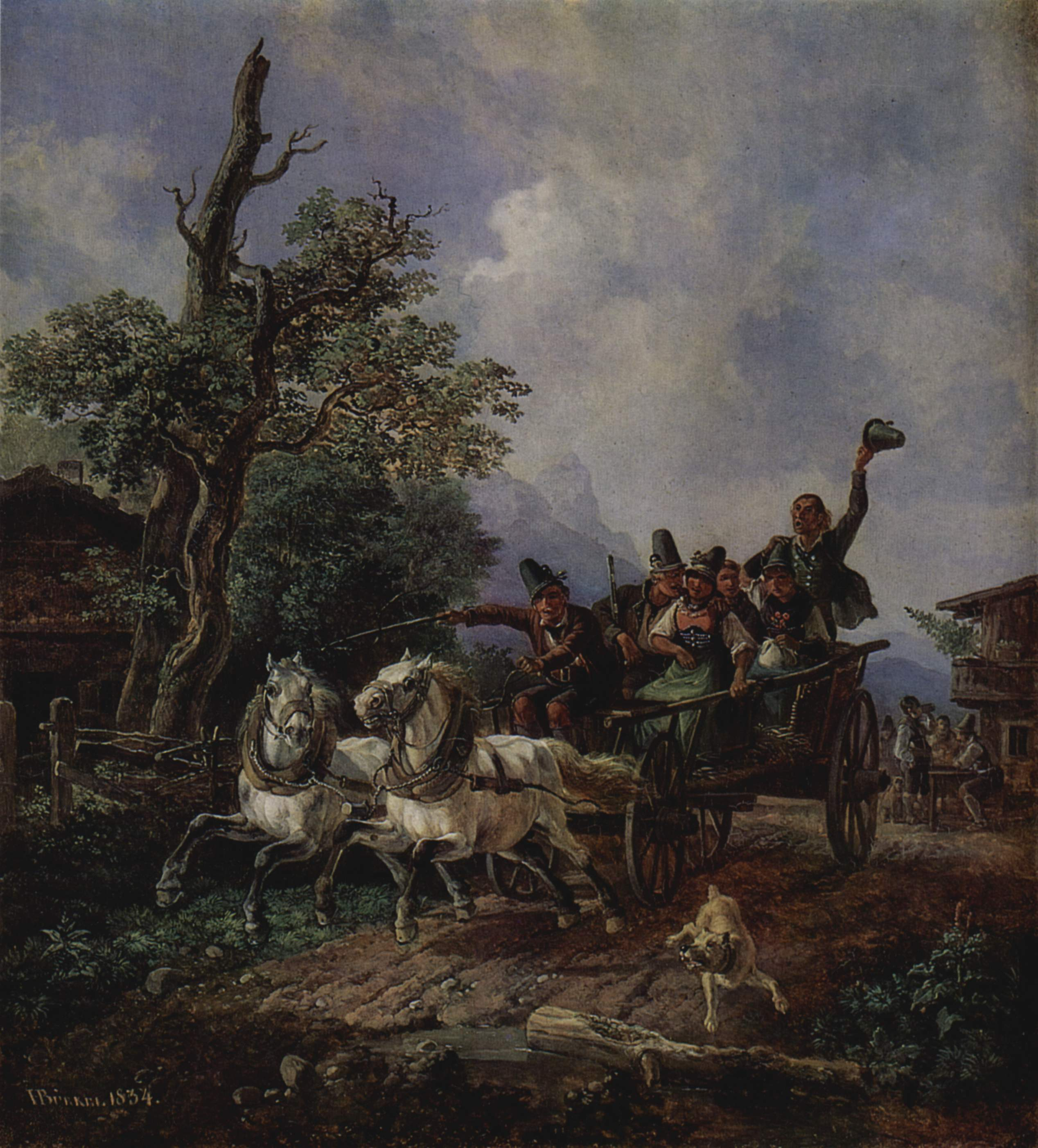
Landscape with farm wagons

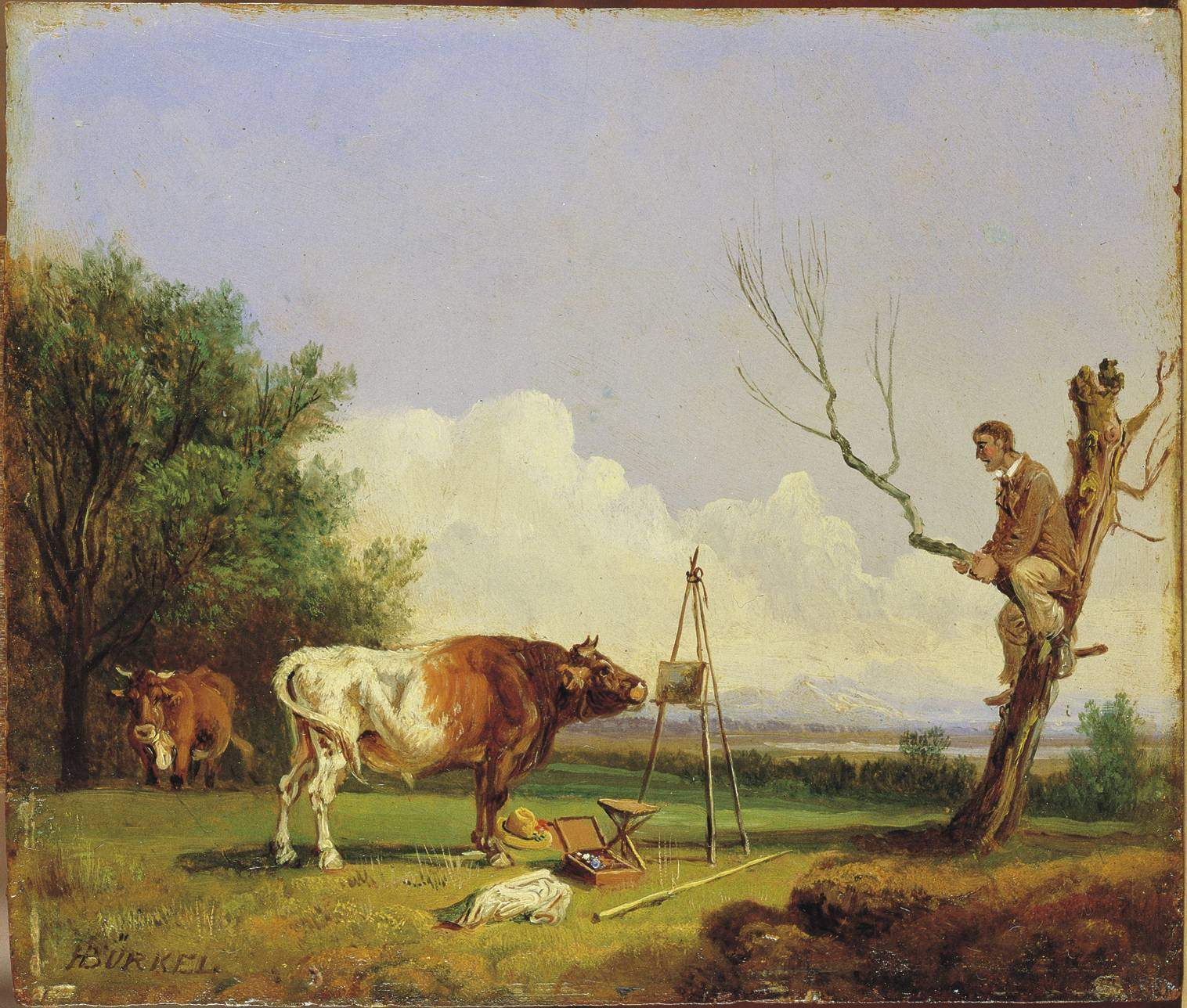
Bull and painter, now in the Bürkel Galerie Pirmasens.

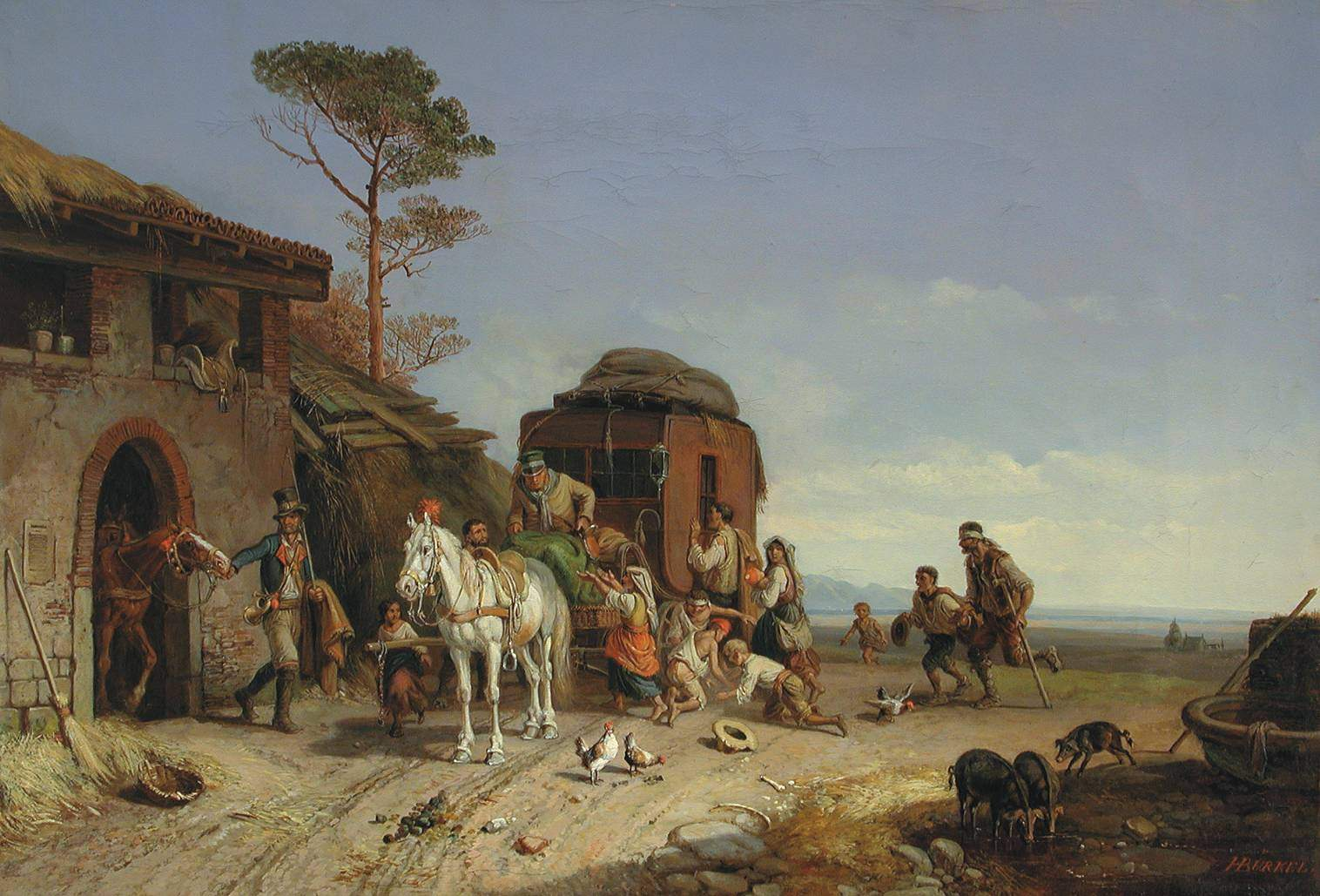
Attack by beggars at an Italian postal station

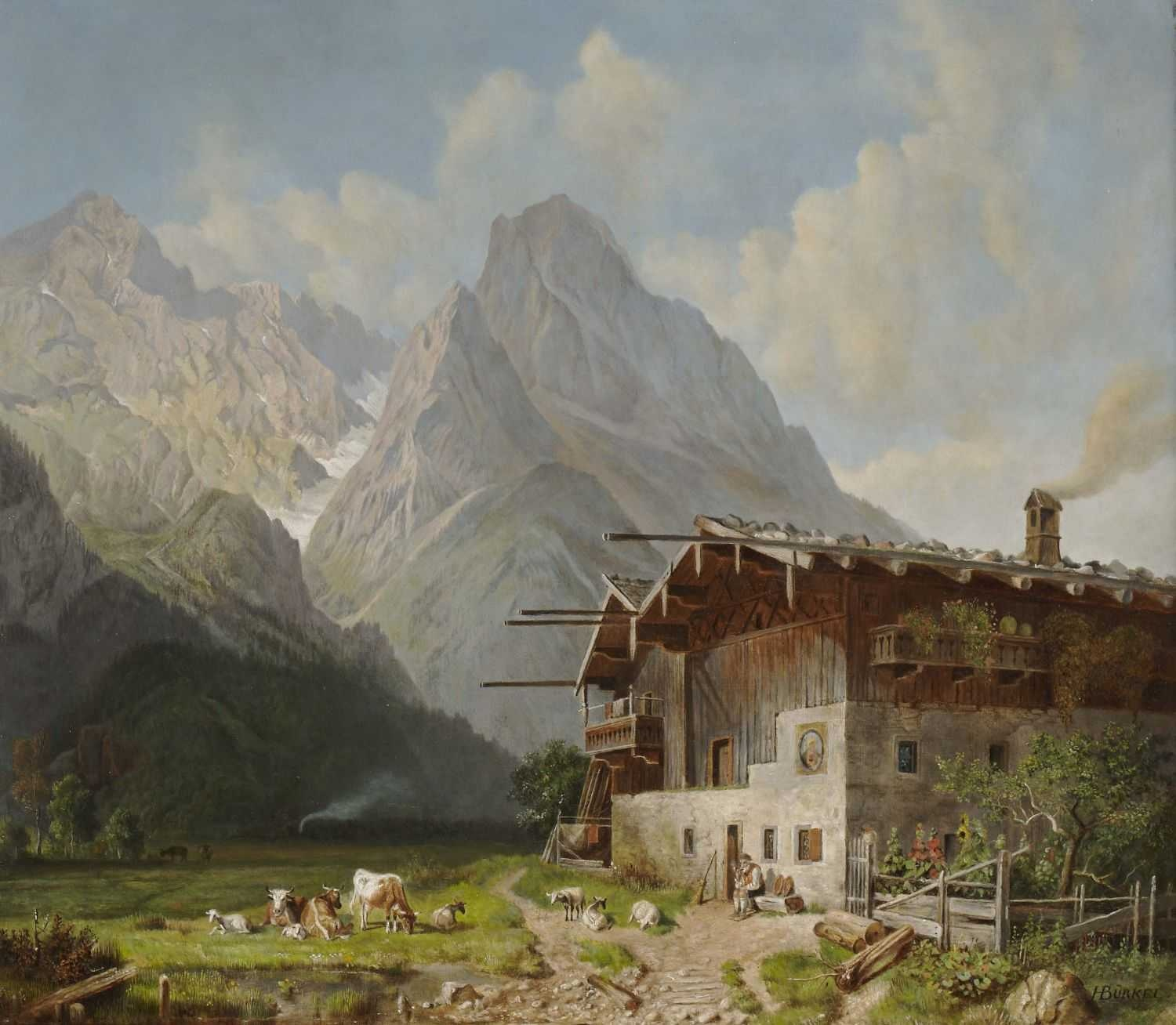
Farm near Garmisch

== See also ==
- List of German painters
