= Brigitte Freihold =

German politician

Member of the Bundestag
- Incumbent
- Assumed office 2017

Personal details
- Born: 9 April 1955 (age 70) Kaiserslautern, West Germany (now Germany)
- Party: The Left
- Children: 2

Brigitte Freihold (born 9 April 1955) is a German politician. Born in Kaiserslautern, Rhineland-Palatinate, she represents The Left. Brigitte Freihold has served as a member of the Bundestag from the state of Rhineland-Palatinate since 2017.

== Life ==
After graduating from high school, Brigitte Freihold studied German and fine arts for the teaching profession for primary and secondary schools and worked as a teacher. She became member of the bundestag after the 2017 German federal election. She stood in Pirmasens and came in 5th place. She is a member of the Committee for Culture and Media. She is spokesperson for her group on Education for Sustainable Development.
