= Anita Schäfer =

German politician

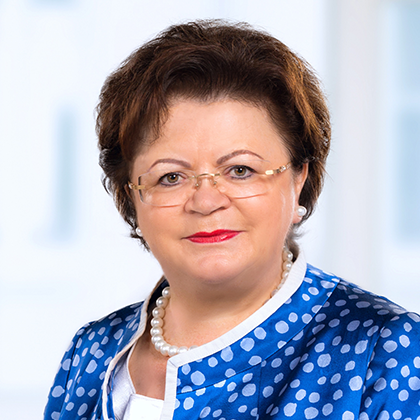
- Schäfer in 2017

Member of the Bundestag from Pirmasens
- In office 1998–2021

Personal details
- Born: 9 July 1951 (age 75) Saalstadt, West Germany (now Germany)
- Party: CDU

Anita Schäfer (born 9 July 1951) is a German politician of the Christian Democratic Union (CDU) who served as a member of the Bundestag from the state of Rhineland-Palatinate from 1998 until 2021. She represented the constituency of Pirmasens.

== Political career ==
Schäfer became a member of the Bundestag in the 1998 German federal election. In parliament, she served on the Defense Committee.

Ahead of the Christian Democrats’ leadership election, Schäfer publicly endorsed in 2020 Friedrich Merz to succeed Annegret Kramp-Karrenbauer as the party's chair.

In August 2020, Schäfer announced that she would not stand in the 2021 federal elections but instead resign from active politics by the end of the parliamentary term.
