= Josef Becker =

German politician (1905–1996)

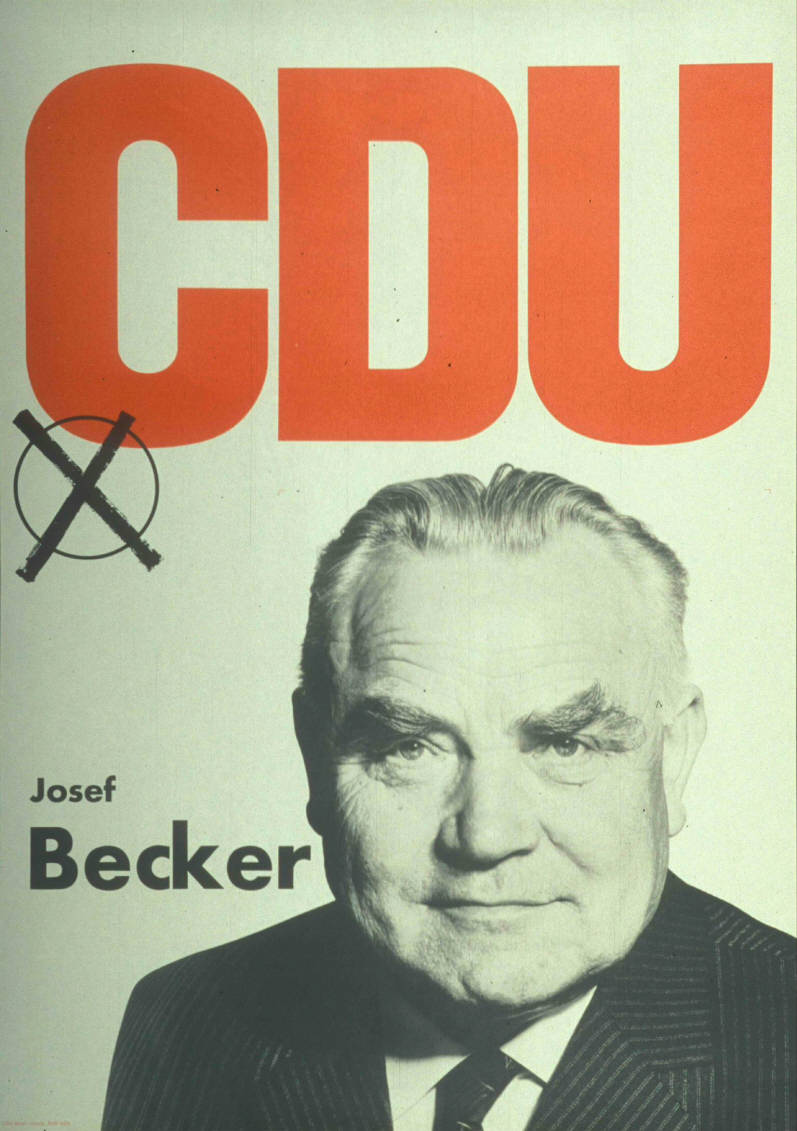
- Election poster (1969)

Member of the Bundestag
- In office 7 September 1949 – 22 September 1972

Personal details
- Born: 8 February 1905 Bochum
- Died: 19 October 1996 (aged 91) Waldfischbach-Burgalben, Rhineland-Palatinate, Germany
- Party: CDU
- Occupation: shoemaker

Josef Becker (8 February 1905 – 19 October 1996) was a German politician of the Christian Democratic Union (CDU) and former member of the German Bundestag.

== Life ==
Before 1933 Becker was a member of the Centre Party. In 1945, he participated in the founding of the CDP, which later became the Rhineland-Palatinate state association of the CDU. In 1946, he was elected to the executive board of the Pirmasens district CDU association and was later its chairman until 1968. Becker had been a member of the Citizens' Council Committee since July 1945 and was a council member of the city of Pirmasens from 1946 to 1979. In 1946/47 he was a member of the Advisory State Assembly of the State of Rhineland-Palatinate.

He was a member of the German Bundestag from its first election in 1949 to 1972. In parliament he represented the constituency of Zweibrücken from 1949 to 1965 and then the constituency of Pirmasens until 1972.

From 1946 to 1948, Becker was second mayor of Pirmasens.

== Literature ==
Herbst, Ludolf; Jahn, Bruno (2002). Vierhaus, Rudolf (ed.). Biographisches Handbuch der Mitglieder des Deutschen Bundestages. 1949–2002 [Biographical Handbook of the Members of the German Bundestag. 1949–2002] (in German). München: De Gruyter - De Gruyter Saur. p. 1715. ISBN 978-3-11-184511-1.
