= Angelika Glöckner =

German politician (born 1962)

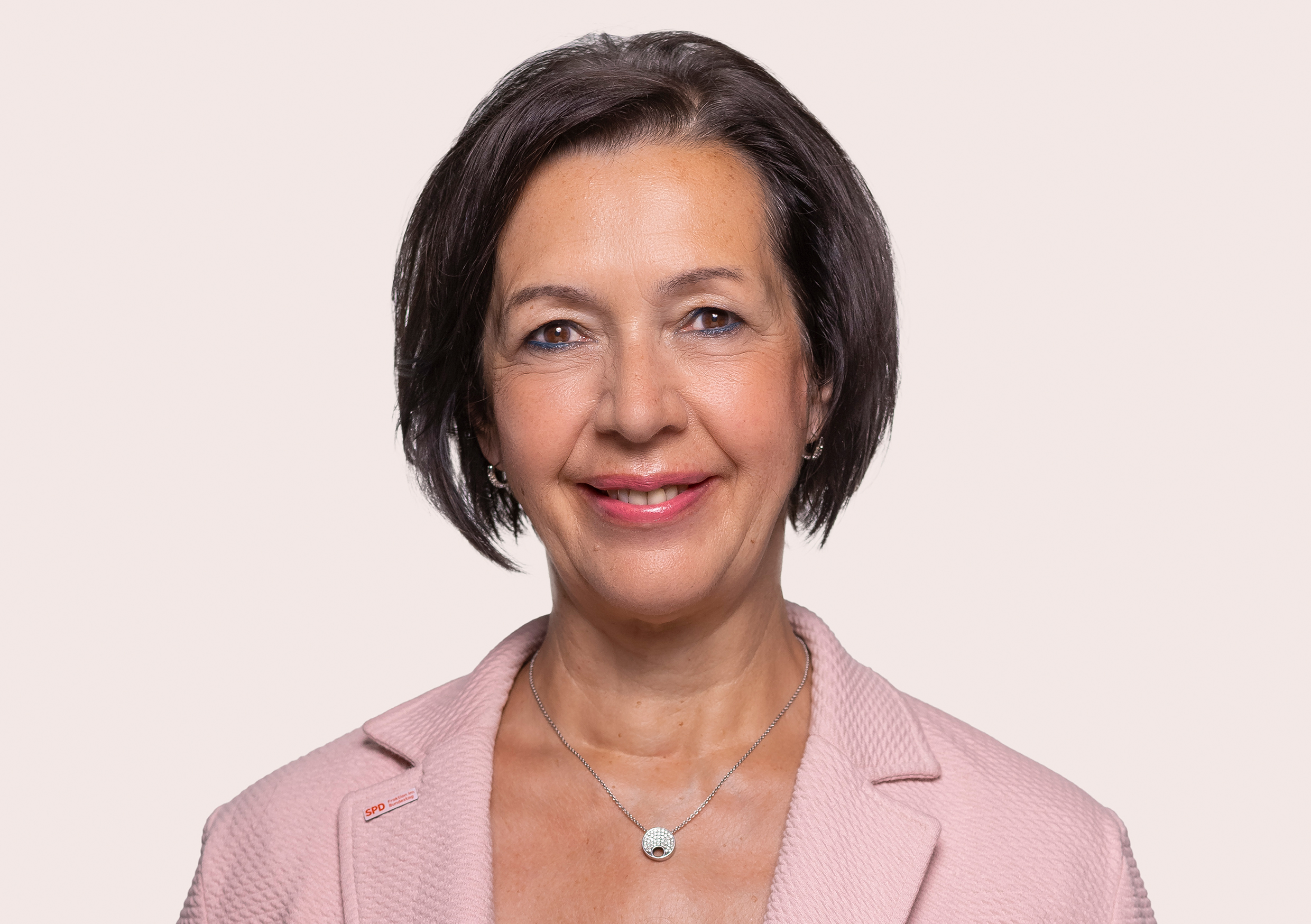

Personal details
- Born: 5 February 1962 (age 63); Pirmasens, Germany
- Political party: SPD
- Occupation: Politician

Angelika Glöckner (born 5 February 1962 in Pirmasens, Rhineland-Palatinate) is a German politician (SPD) and a member of the German Bundestag since 2014.

== Education and early career ==
Glöckner attended the Hugo-Ball-Gymnasium in Pirmasens, which she graduated from in 1981.

From 1981 to 1983, she worked in the Rheinberger shoe factory. From 1983 to 1985, Glöckner completed an apprenticeship as a clerk in office communication at the Municipality of Pirmasens, where she worked from 1985 to 1987 in the office of Municipal Finance. In the years 1987 and 1988, she worked for the Pirmasenser Messe GmbH, so that she could take over a job in the Office of Culture and Tourism of the city of Pirmasens from 1988 to 1993. Glöckner was active from 1993 to 1999 in the city's public order office, driving license department. From 1999 to 2001, she worked in the city's social services office before being exempted from 2001 to 2014 as staff council chairperson. Furthermore, she completed a training as a management specialist from 1988 to 1992, and from 1996 to 1999 a part-time degree course at the Business and Administrative Academy Kaiserslautern with a focus on business administration and economics.

== Political career ==
Glöckner has been a member of the SPD since 1995, since February 2014 she is the leader of the SPD city association of Pirmasens, as well as the deputy chairman of the SPD sub-district Pirmasens-Zweibrücken since 20 September 2014.

For the election to the Bundestag in 2013, Glöckner joined the SPD Rhineland-Palatinate and was elected with 81.6% to the 11th place on the state list. She also missed out on the direct mandate in the constituency of Pirmasens with 32.2%. On 12 November 2014, she replaced Sabine Bätzing Lichtenthäler in the Bundestag, who took on her new job as Minister of Social Affairs of the State of Rhineland-Palatinate.

In parliament, Glöckner serves on the Committee on European Affairs and the Committee on Human Rights and Humanitarian Aid. She is also a member of the SPD parliamentary group in the Bundestag's working group on local politics. Since 2019, Glöckner has been serving on the board of the German-French Parliamentary Assembly.

=== Positions and controversies ===
100 days after Glöckner had started her Bundestag mandate, in March 2015, she announced to the Pirmasenser Zeitung that in view of the great need, she considers EU refugee camps in North Africa to be necessary in order to stop trafficking gangs. In addition, the federal government would, of course, be obliged to support municipalities in the accommodation of refugees.

Although she had voted in favor of the second Greek aid package, she also expected action from the new Greek government instead of words in implementing the austerity measures. "Only as long as the country fulfills its obligations, can it expect a concession," said Glöckner to the newspaper.

In the 2013 Bundestag election campaign, she was criticised by Frank Eschrich, chairman of the Left Party of Pirmasens, for inviting people to an election campaign event with "free entry and free skate rental for her guests."

== Personal life ==
Glöckner is married and has two children, and lives in Lemberg (Pfalz).

== Memberships ==
- Member of the union Ver.di since 1983
- Member of the Rhineland-Palatinate Ver.di state executive committee of the municipalities department until 2014
- Deputy Chairwoman of the Palatinate Ver.di District Board for municipalities
- Member of the Working Group for Employee Issues (AfA) of the SPD sub-district Pirmasens-Zweibrücken
- Member of the AfA state executive board Rhineland-Palatinate since 2003
- Chairwoman of the Association of Social Democratic Women (AsF) of the sub-district Pirmasens/Zweibrücken
- honorary judge at the Employment Court of Kaiserslautern
- Member of the representative meeting of Unfallkasse Rheinland-Pfalz since 2011
- Member of the nonpartisan Europa-Union Deutschland since 2018
