= Pirmasens =

- Town
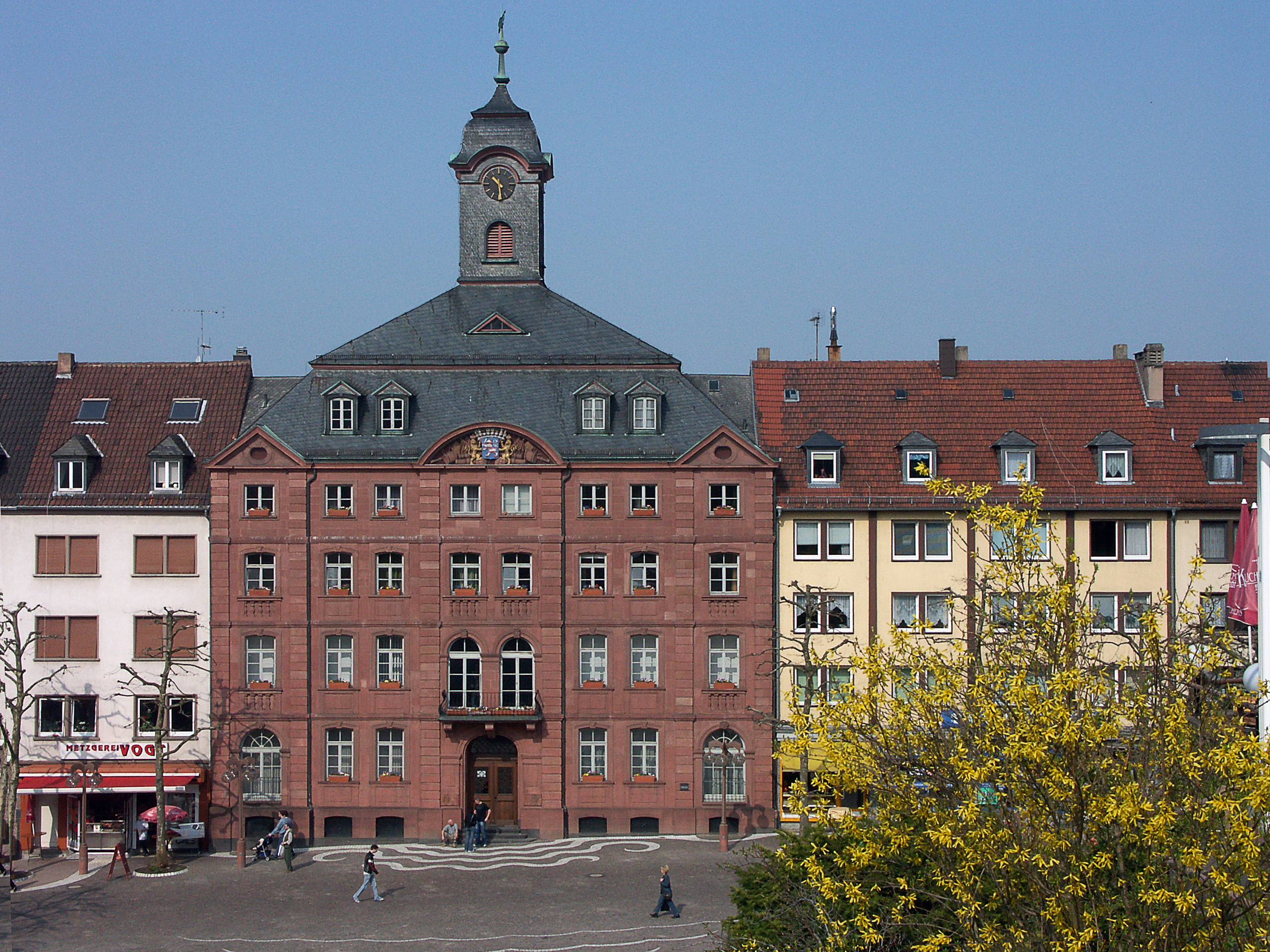
- Old town hall

- Flag Coat of arms
- Interactive map of Pirmasens
- Location within Germany Location within Rhineland-Palatinate
- Coordinates: 49°12′N 7°36′E
- Country: Germany
- State: Rhineland-Palatinate
- District: Urban district

Government
  - Mayor (2018–26): Markus Christian Zwick (CDU)

Area
  - Total: 61.36 km^{2} (23.69 sq mi)
- Elevation: 380 m (1,250 ft)

Population (2025-12-31)
  - Total: 39,389
  - Density: 641.9/km^{2} (1,663/sq mi)
- Time zone: UTC+01:00 (CET)
  - Summer (DST): UTC+02:00 (CEST)
- Postal codes: 66953–66955
- Dialling codes: 06331
- Vehicle registration: PS
- Website: www.pirmasens.de

Pirmasens (German pronunciation: [ˈpɪʁmazɛns]; Palatine German: Bärmesens (also Bermesens or Bärmasens)) is an independent town in Rhineland-Palatinate, Germany, near the border with France. It was famous for the manufacture of shoes. The surrounding rural district was called Landkreis Pirmasens from 1818 until 1997, when it was renamed to Südwestpfalz.

== History ==
=== Early years ===
Map of Pirmasens (around 1750)

The first mention of "Pirminiseusna", a colony of Hornbach Abbey, dates from 860. The name derives from St. Pirminius, the founder of the monastery. During the period it was under rule of the Bishopric of Metz. It was passed to the Diocese of Speyer in last the quarter of the 11th century, then captured by the County of Saarbrücken in 1100.

In 1182, the County of Saarbrücken was divided by Simon II and Henry I, who were sons of Simon I. Pirmasens was given to Henry I and his dominion was named as County of Zweibrücken. He built Lemberg Castle to protect his dominion in 1198. During this period Pirmasens was under the formal jurisdiction of the bishop of Metz, but the parish administration of Pirmasens was passed to the monastery of Hornbach after confirmation by John, Bishop of Metz, in 1225.

In 1297, the County of Zweibrücken was divided and Pirmasens was passed to the County of Zweibrücken-Bitsch, Eberhard I's dominion. He traded some localities with Duke Frederick III of Lorraine and took lordship of Bitsch in the same year.

In 1525, during the German Peasants' War, Pirmasens was looted by peasants from Bitsch. In 1560, Ludowika Margaretha of Zweibrücken-Bitsch, daughter of Count James of Zweibrücken-Bitsch (1510–1570), the last male member of the House of Zweibrücken, was married to Philip V, Count of Hanau-Lichtenberg. In 1570, Count James of Zweibrücken-Bitsch died without male heir and Ludowika Margaretha inherited the County of Bitsch, the Lordship of Ochsenstein and half the Lordship of Lichtenberg (Philip's father had already held the other half). James's older brother, Simon V Wecker, had already died in 1540, also without a male heir. A dispute about the inheritance erupted between the husbands of Ludowika Margaretha and of her cousin Amalie, Philip V of Hanau-Lichtenberg and Philip I of Leiningen-Westerburg, respectively. Formally, the County of Bitsch and the district of Lemberg were fiefs of the Duchy of Lorraine and such fiefs could only be inherited in the male line.

Philip V was initially successful in the dispute with Philip I about Zweibrücken-Bitsch. However, he introduced the Lutheran confession in his newly gained territories in 1572. This upset his powerful Catholic neighbour and liege lord, Duke Charles III of Lorraine. The Duke terminated the fief and in July 1572 Lorraine troops occupied the county. Since Philip V's army was no match for Lorraine, he took his case to the Imperial Chamber Court in Speyer. During the trial, Lorraine argued that, firstly, a significant part of the territory of Zweibrücken-Bitsch had been obtained in an exchange with Lorraine in 1302 and, secondly, the Counts of Leiningen had sold their hereditary claims to Lorraine in 1573. In 1604, Hanau-Lichtenberg and Lorraine decided to settle out of court. In a treaty signed in 1606, it was agreed that Bitsch would revert to Lorraine and Hanau-Lichtenberg would retain Lemberg. This corresponded approximately to the religious realities of the territories. Since then, Pirmasens was part of the Amt Lemberg in the County of Hanau-Lichtenberg.

Before the Thirty Years War, Pirmasens had 59 families and about 235 inhabitants resident, whereas in Lemberg were counted 54 families (about 215 people). When counting it was assumed at that time that a family consisted of four to five people. In 1622, Pirmasens and Lemberg were ravaged by Spaniards and Croatian horsemen of the Imperial troops. The imperial army set fire to the village. Even the church was destroyed in a fire. After the withdrawal of the troops, the Pirmasens inhabitants began to rebuild it. It was again ravaged by imperial troops under Matthias Gallas. They also looted Lemberg Castle, which was burned in 1636. Then the headquarters of the Lutheran parish of Lemberg was moved to Pirmasens. But Pirmasens was heavily damaged in the war. In 1657, only 9 families (about 40 people) lived there. The population then slowly increased through immigration of Reformed Swiss, Catholic Tyrolean as well as Franconian and Württembergian families, so that in 1661, 21 families (about 87 people) were counted in Pirmasens. During the Franco-Dutch War in 1677, the town was burned down again, this time by French troops. During the Nine Years' War, it was sacked by French troops under General de Ezéchiel Mélac, who devastated the Palatinate in 1689. In 1691, only 16 people lived in Pirmasens. At the same time, the part of Lemberg Castle that was still habitable after the Thirty Years' War, was completely destroyed. Thus, the administrative centre of Amt Lemberg was moved to Pirmasens in 1697. This made Pirmasens the most important locality of the region.

In 1736, Johann Reinhard III, the last count of Hanau-Lichtenberg, died without male heir and the duchy passed to his grandson, Landgrave Ludwig IX of Hesse-Darmstadt, the son of Countess Charlotte of Hanau-Lichtenberg, sole heir of the county of Hanau Lichtenberg, and Ludwig VIII, Landgrave of Hesse-Darmstadt.

Landgrave Ludwig IX took residence in his grandfather's hunting lodge in Pirmasens, Schloss Pirmasens, and established a garrison. In 1763, Pirmasens was granted city rights by Ludwig IX, who stayed in his small residence even after taking office in Hesse-Darmstadt after his father's death in 1768. The garrison was continuously expanded, and a town hall, two churches and a large exercise hall were erected. Residence and garrison abruptly ended with the landgrave's death in 1790.

In 1793, Pirmasens was the location of the Battle of Pirmasens between Prussia and the French Corps of the Vosges. The French lost the battle, but their opponents' internal divisions nevertheless enabled them to return and occupy Pirmasens by the end of the year: between 1798 and 1814, the town was included in the French département of Mont-Tonnerre ("Donnersberg-Département" in German). After the French defeat, it was made part of Bavaria together with the Rhenish Palatinate.

=== 20th century ===
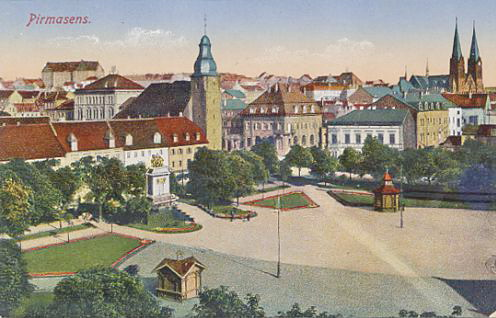
Pirmasens in 1910

- 1923/24 tests of Palatinate separatists to settle down in Pirmasens failed on 12 February 1924: occupation of the district town hall, home of the separatist administration; many deaths on both sides;
- 9 November 1938 destruction of the synagogue during the Kristallnacht.

On 15 March 1945, Pirmasens was captured by US troops, and the following year it became part of the newly established German state Rhineland-Palatinate.

During the occupation, on 19 September 1945, the Museum of Pirmasens announced that about 50 paintings, which had been stored in the air-raid shelter at Husterhoh School during the war, had been plundered during the arrival of the American troops. The paintings were returned in 2006.

In the wake of the 2015 European migrant crisis and the 2022 Russian invasion of Ukraine, the city came under economic pressure due to the high numbers of refugees and migrants it had to support. In early 2025 every fourth citizen had a migrant background. As a result, between March 2018 and May 2021, Pirmasens was exempt from the admission of new arrivals by the state; a new exemption becomes effective in February 2025.

== Main sights ==
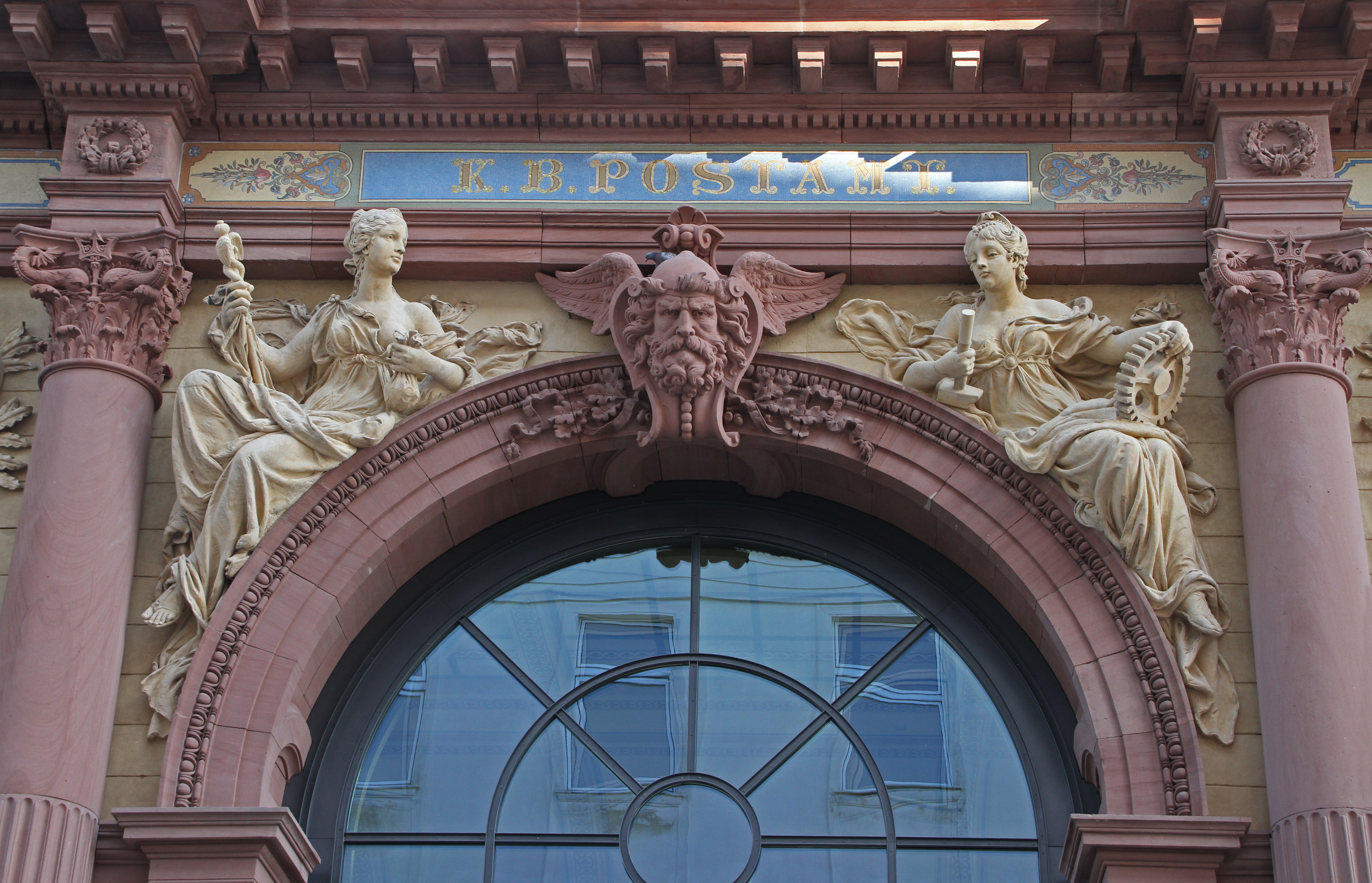
Old Postal Building

- Dynamikum, a science museum
- Old Postal Building, with an exhibition of the life and work of Hugo Ball and a picture gallery of the painter Heinrich Bürkel
- Collected works of Hugo Ball in the public library
- Old Town Hall, now a museum of local history and shoes, with silhouettes from Elisabeth Emmler
- Siegfried Line Museum
- Stierbrunnen (Central of the Shopping Area)
- Exerzierplatz (The geographical center of the city)
- Countless forests and springs around the city

== Incorporations ==
- 1969: Erlenbrunn, Fehrbach, Hengsberg, Niedersimten, Winzeln
- 1972: Gersbach, Windsberg

Evolution of population (since 1875):

- 1875 – 10,136
- 1890 – 21,041
- 1925 – 42,996
- 1933 – 47,221
- 1939 – 50,560
- 1950 – 49,676
- 1970 – 57,773
- 1987 – 47,997
- 2000 – 45,212
- 2001 – 44,822
- 2002 – 44,367
- 2003 – 43,971
- 2004 – 43,637
- 2005 – 44,137
- 2006 – 43,456
- 2007 – 41,875
- 2008 – 41,358
- 2011 – 40,888

== Politics ==
Town council as at August 2014:

- CDU 40.7% – 18 seats
- SPD 28.0% – 12 seats
- FWG 10.4% – 5 seats
- REP 4.6% – 2 seats
- FDP 4.0% – 2 seats
- Die Linke 5.0% – 2 seats
- The Greens 4.6% – 2 seats
- National Democratic Party of Germany 2.0% – 1 seat

== Twin towns – sister cities ==
Pirmasens is twinned with:

- Poissy, France

== Culture ==
=== Events ===
- The "Landgrafen-Tage" (days of the landgraves) - every second weekend in April
- Open-Air Highlights at the parade-ground (e.g. musicals, opera)
- "Schlabbeflicker-Fest", a parade of uniformed musicians - every first weekend in August
- Parade-ground festival - every second weekend in September
- Euroclassic festival (Festival of the cities: Pirmasens, Bitche, Zweibrücken, Blieskastel and of the Verbandsgemeinde Zweibrücken-Land)
- "Grenadiermarkt" (infantryman market) - in Autumn
- "Novembermarkt" - last weekend of October or first weekend of November
- Christmas market in Advent
- Yearly Conventions like "Culinaria"

=== Music ===
- Choir of oratory Pirmasens
- Chantor's house of Pirmasens

=== Theatre ===
- Performances at the festival hall

== Sport ==
- FK Pirmasens
- TV 1863 Pirmasens
- VFB Pirmasens
- GW Pirmasens
- SG Pirmasens
- Rot-Weiß Pirmasens
- Blau-Weiß Pirmasens
- ASV Pirmasens
- TTC Pirmasens
- TUS/DJK Pirmasens
- SV 1907 Ruhbank
- RC Pirmasens
- 1. Boule Verein Pirmasens
- MTV 1873 Pirmasens

== Companies ==
- Carl Semler shoe factory
- ZWAANS GmbH - Import/Export of tannery machines, orthopedic branche
- Ergo-Fit - manufacturer of cardiology equipment
- FWB Kunststofftechnik GmbH - injection moulding
- Apoplex medical technologies GmbH - products for the prevention of stroke
- Cytoimmun diagnostics GmbH - cervical cancer screening
- Koch Maschinenbau GmbH - engineering
- Peter Kaiser GmbH - Germany's oldest shoe-factory
- Park&Bellheimer AG - brewery
- Profine GmbH, Kömmerling - manufacturer of synthetic material; major company
- psb GmbH
- SympaTel Telemarketing GmbH
- WAFO GmbH - specialist in the abrasion technique
- WAWI Euro GmbH - chocolate factory
- "Pirmasenser Zeitung" local newspaper
- "Die Rheinpfalz" local newspaper
- KD Schaltanlagenbau
- CONVAR Deutschland GmbH - provides data recovery of hard drives within difficult setups
- Footwear Concept and Design GmbH - Shoe design, Outsole design, mould manufacture and rapid prototyping
- Dampf-Shop GmbH
- WHG-Rahn GmbH - Systems for heating and cooling, plumbing
- Framas
- WASGAU AG

== Education ==
- Fachhochschule Kaiserslautern, Campus Pirmasens located in Pirmasens
- Deutsche Schuhfachschule

== Transport ==
The nearest airports to the town are:

- Saarbrücken Airport, located 56 km (35 mi) west
- Karlsruhe/Baden-Baden Airport, located 106 km (66 mi) south east
- Strasbourg Airport, located 106 km (66 mi) south
- Stuttgart Airport, located 159 km (99 mi) south east
- Frankfurt Airport, located 160 km (99 mi) north east

== Notable people ==
- Heinrich Bürkel (1802–1869), genre and landscape painter
- Godfrey Weitzel (1835–1884), Union Army general during the American Civil War
- Hugo Ball (1886–1927), author, poet, founder of the Dada movement
- Betty Amann (1905–1990), actor
- Ralph H. Baer (1922–2014), German-American inventor, game developer and engineer
- Angelika Glöckner (born 1962), politician
- Dieter Janecek (born 1976), politician
- Julian Steckel (born 1982), cellist
- Erik Durm (born 1992), footballer

== Military ==
Husterhoeh Kaserne was a former (1945–1994) US military facility in Pirmasens, and is now a mostly closed Bundeswehr facility, which still hosts U.S. Army Medical Materiel Center – Europe. It was a constituent member of the Kaiserslautern Military Community.

== Gallery ==
Pirmasens

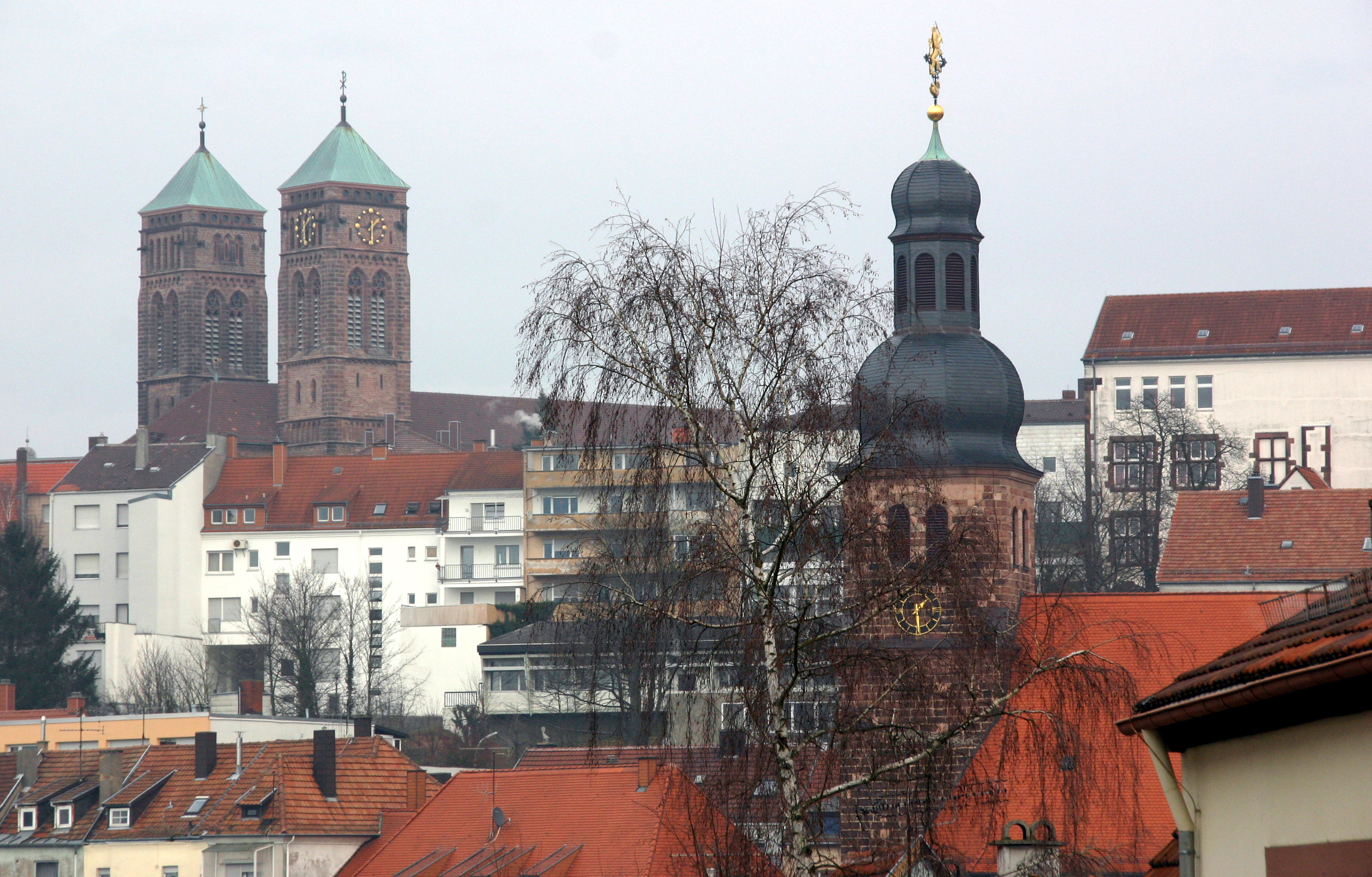
Oecumenic view

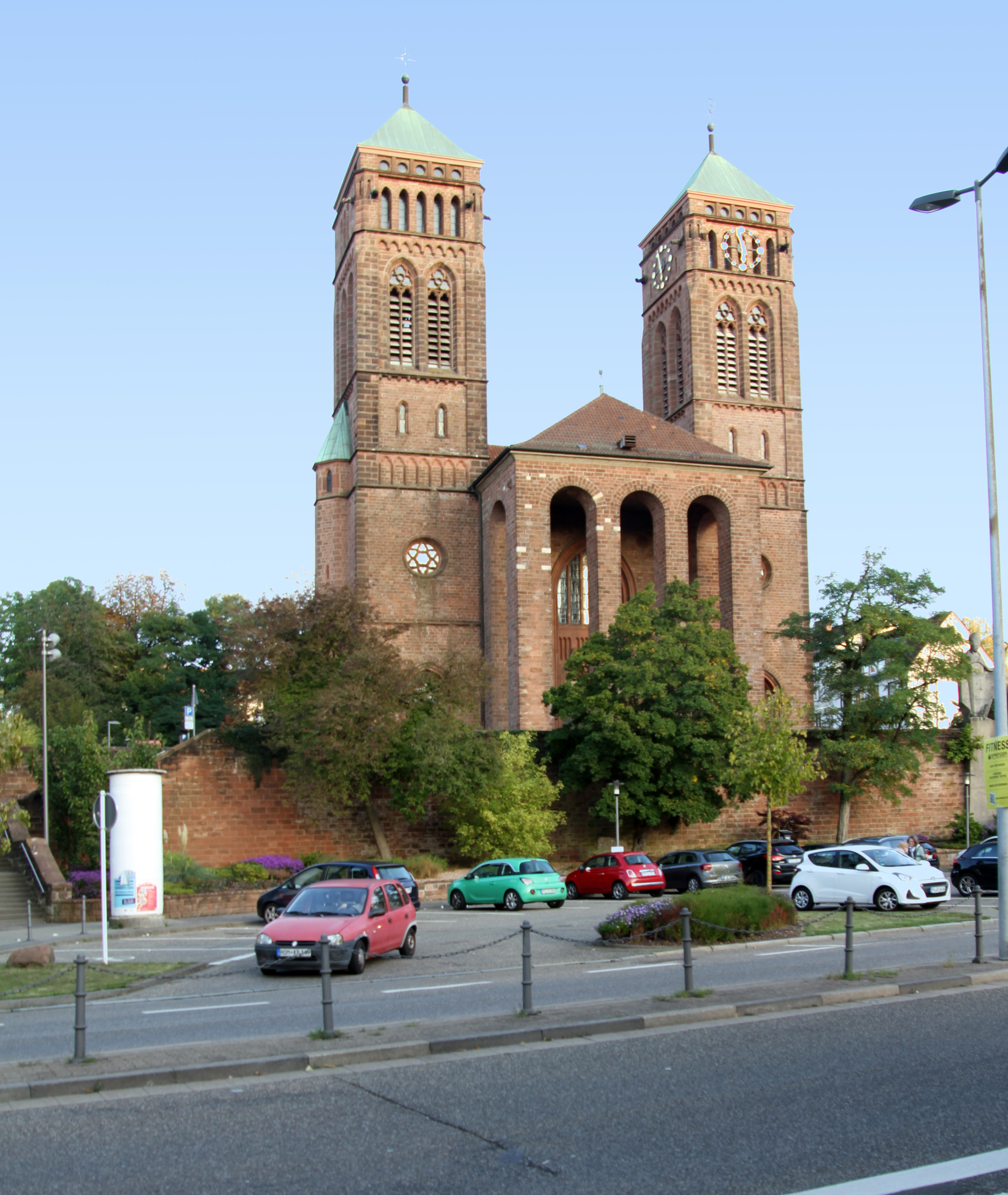
St. Pirminius

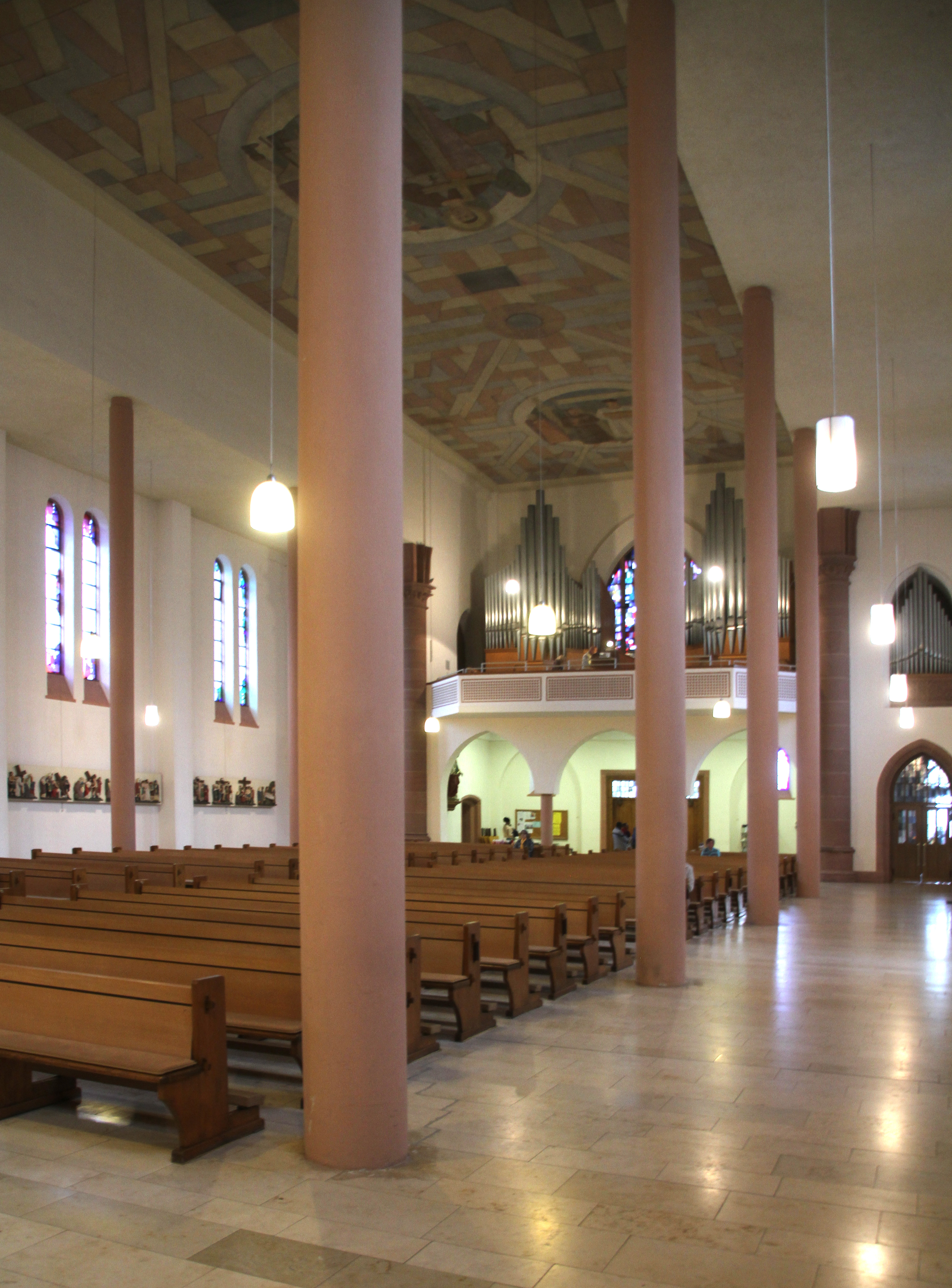
St. Pirminius

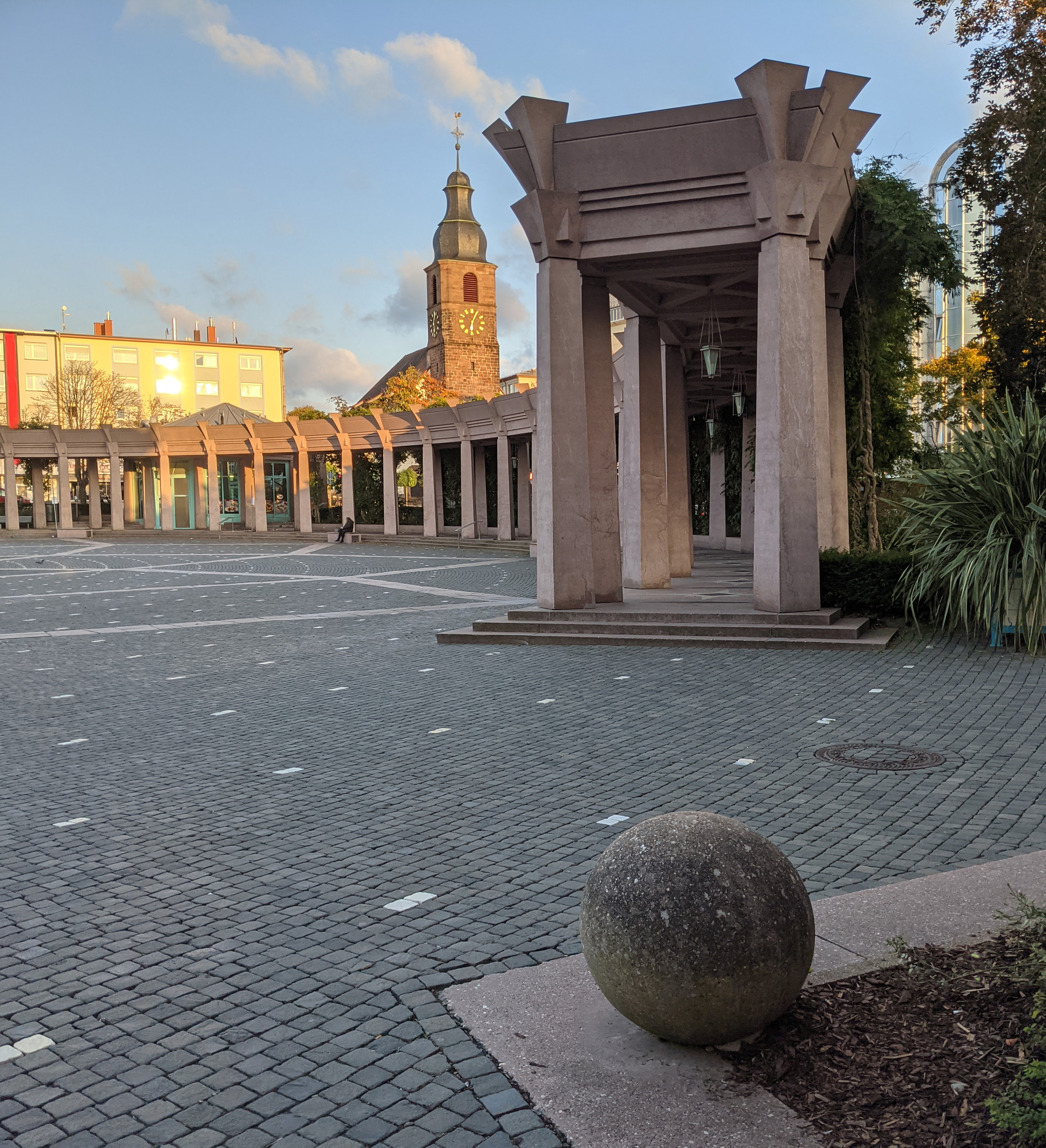
Parade ground and St. John's Church

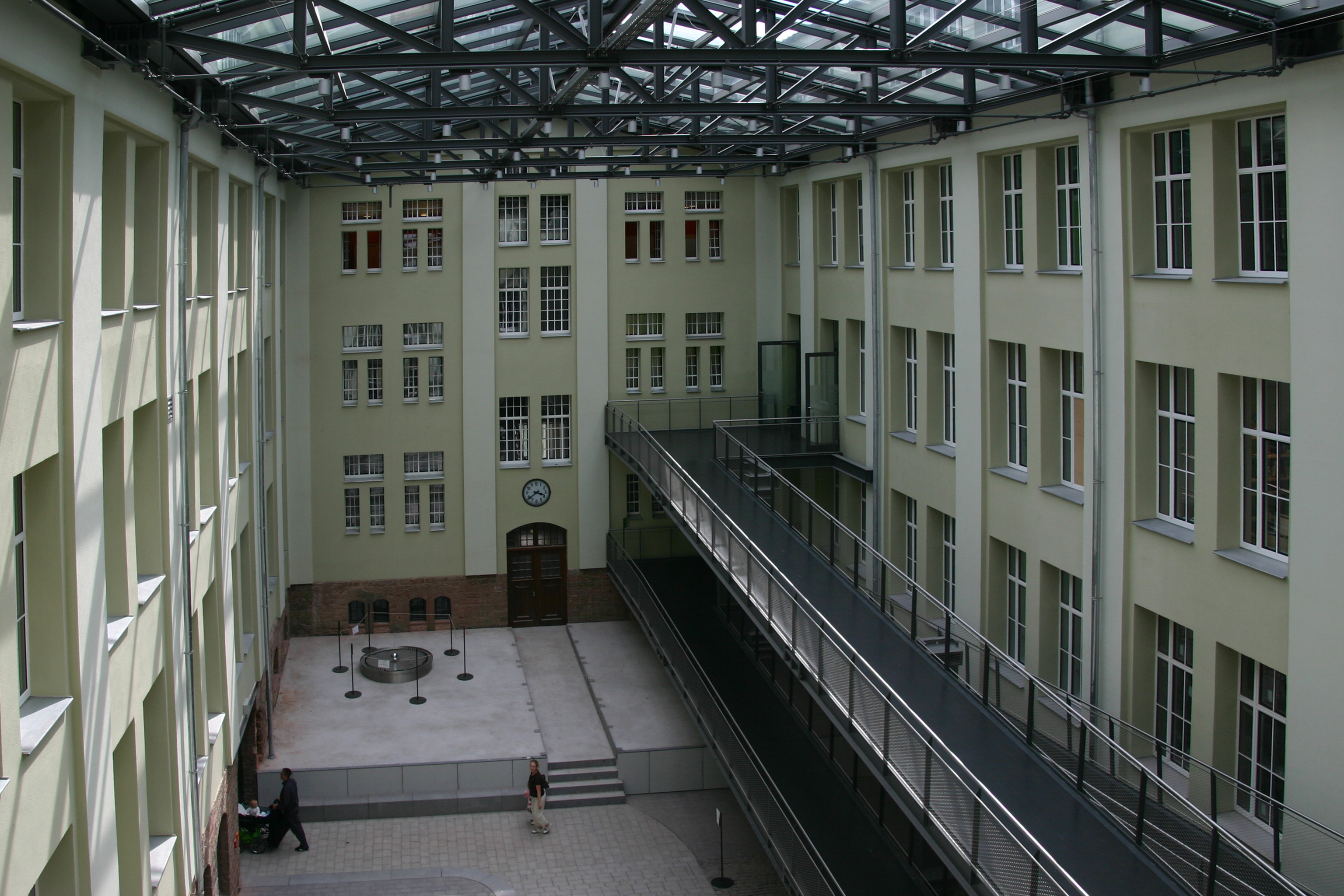
Dynamikum

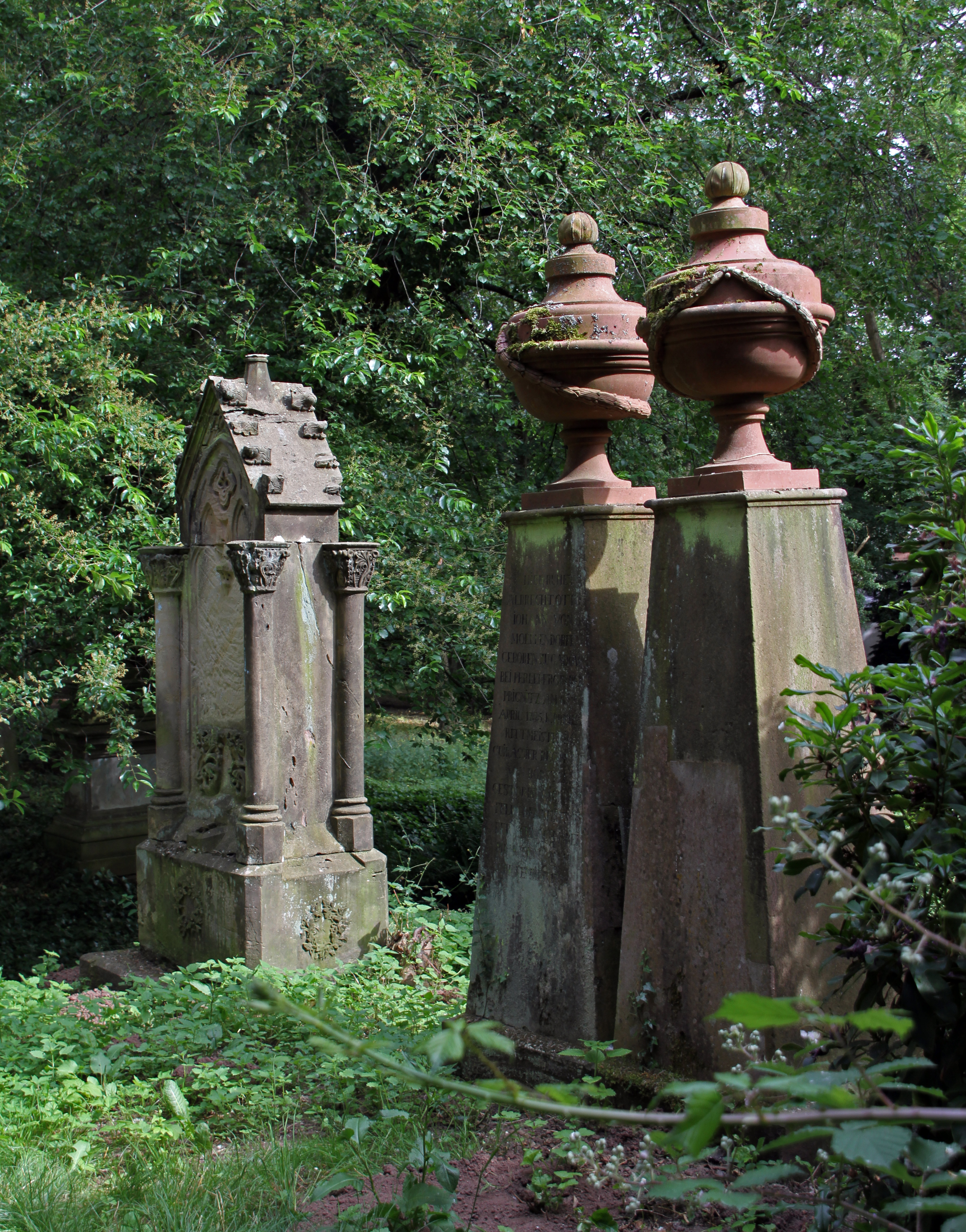
Old cemetery

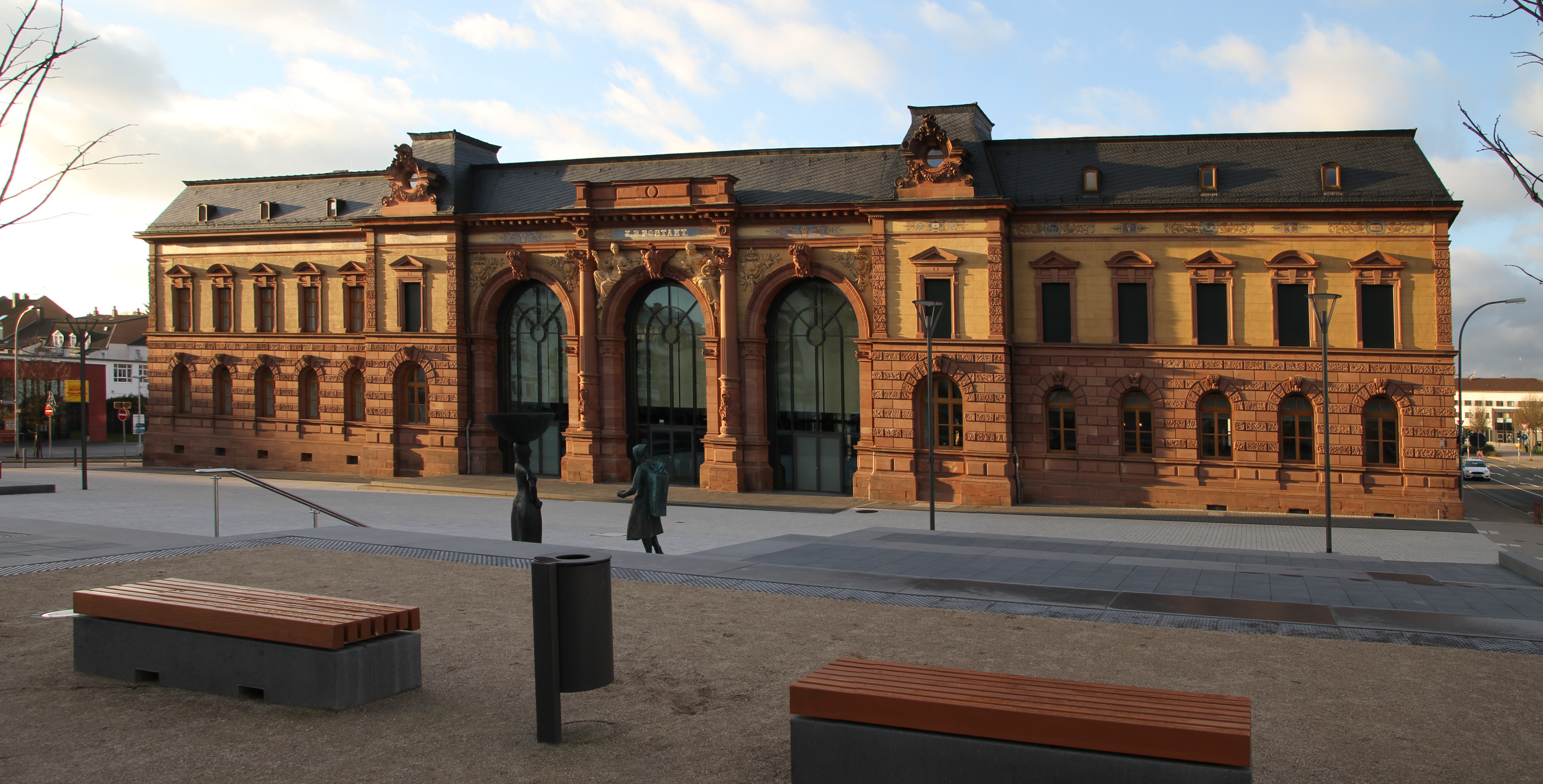
Old Postal Building

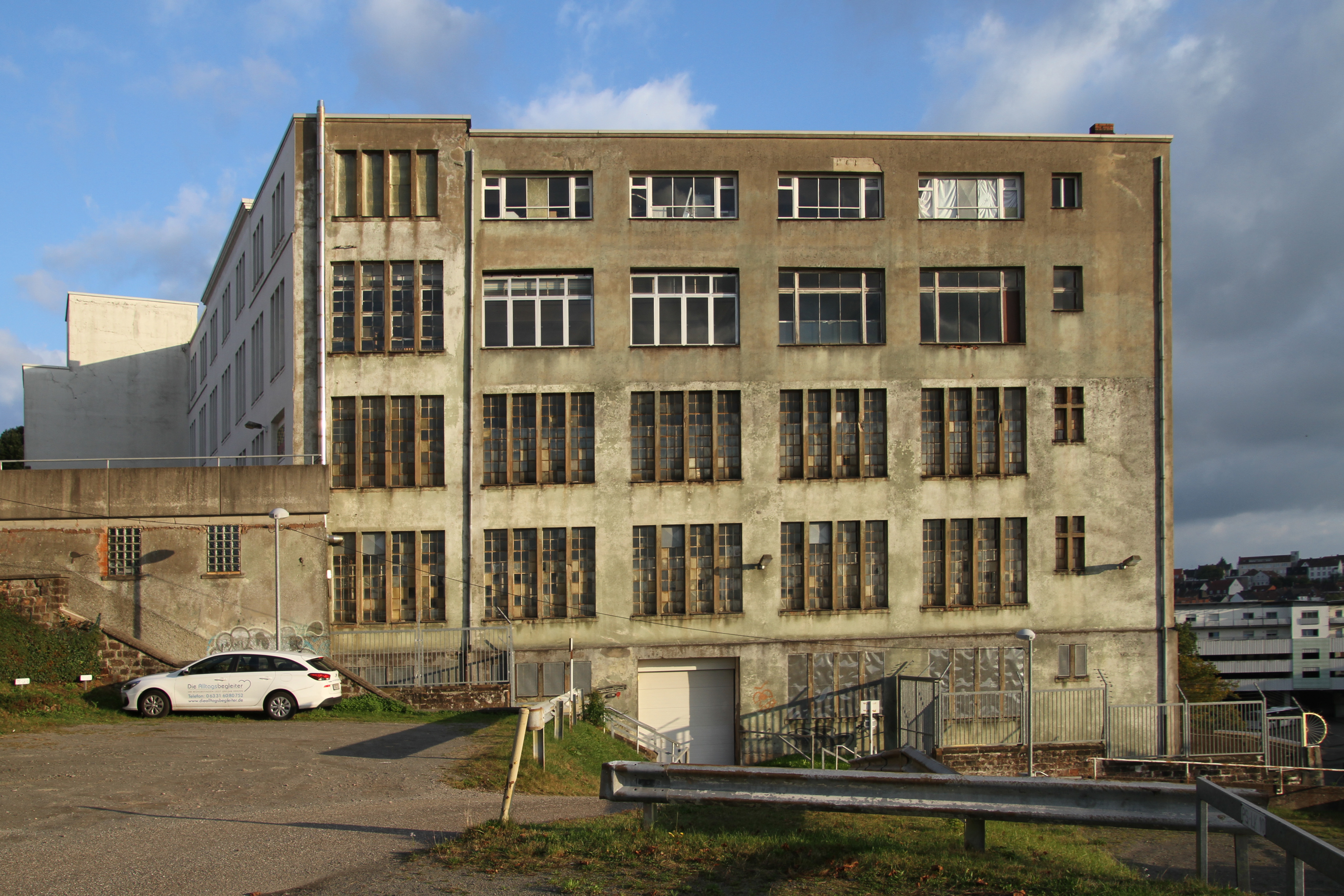
Former shoe factory

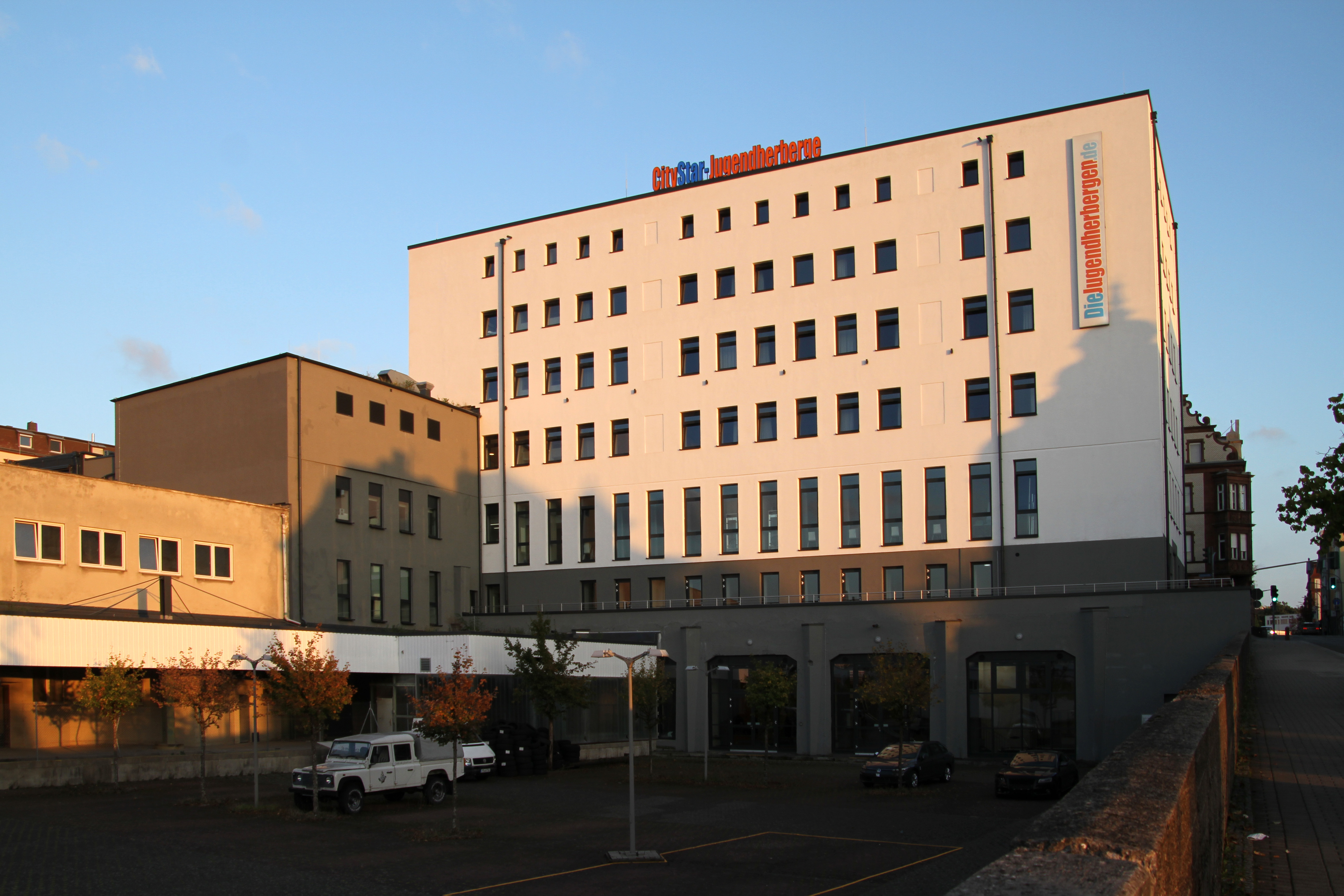
Youth hostel

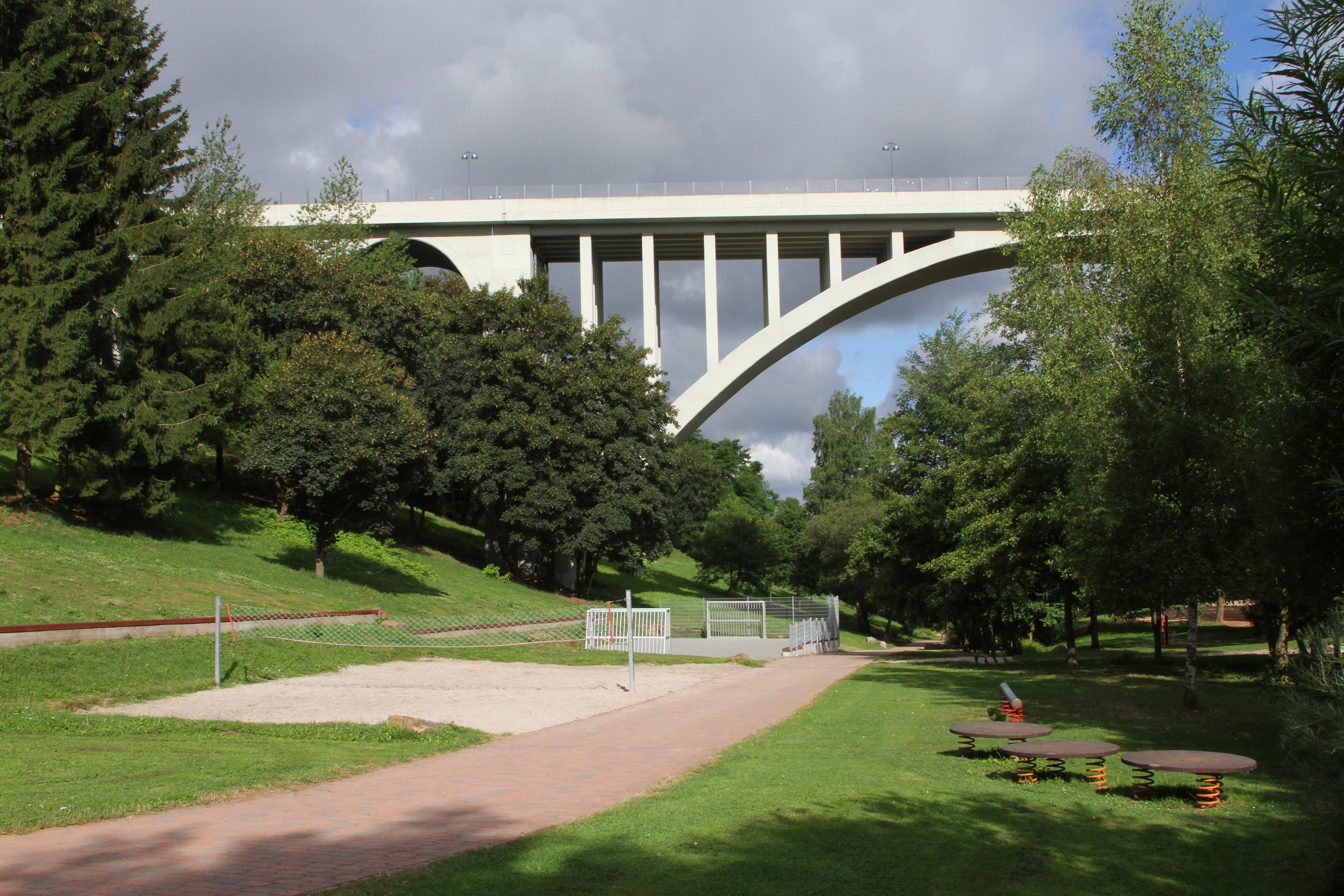
Streck valley bridge
