= Langatte =

- Commune
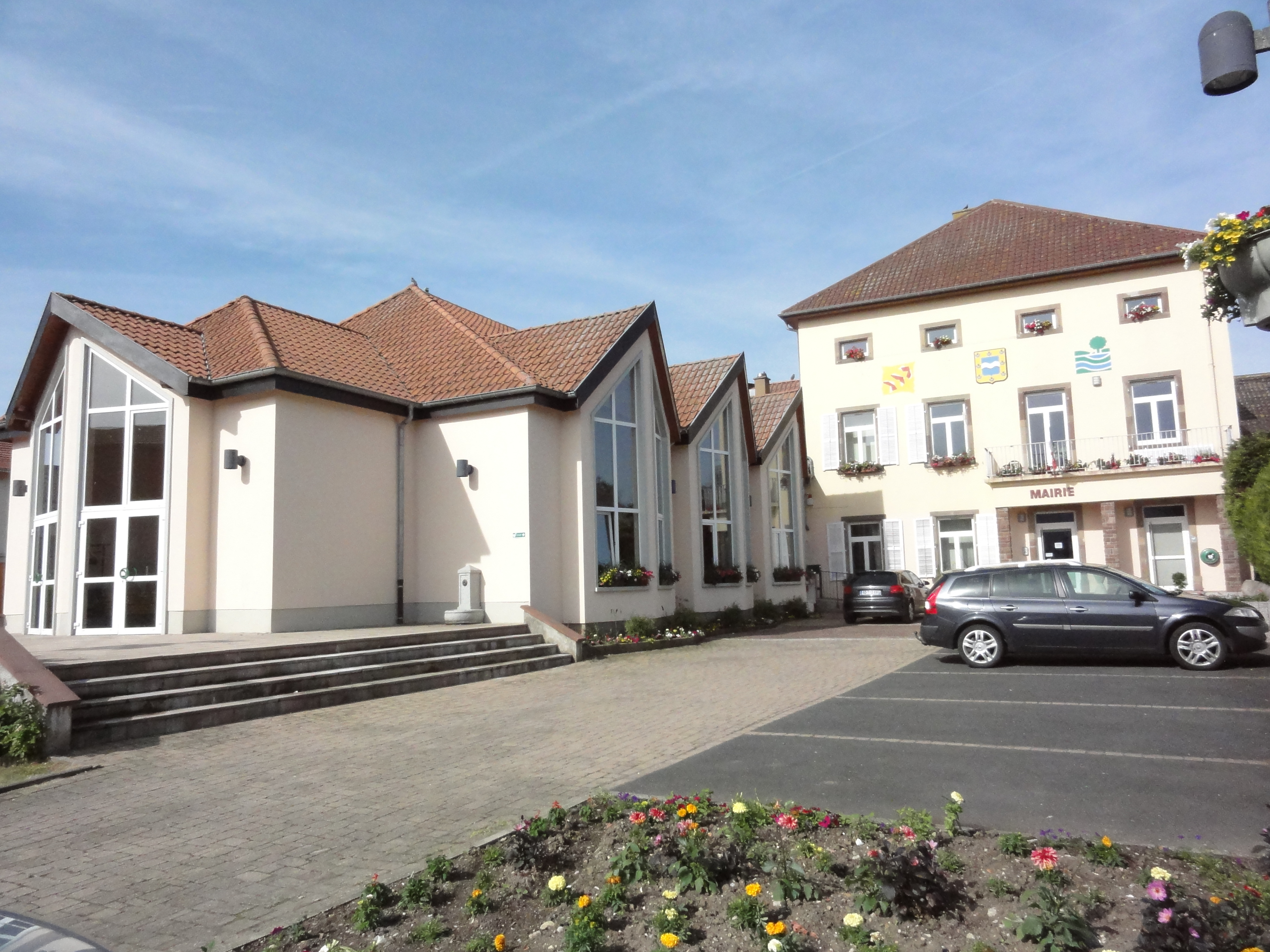
- The town hall in Langatte

- Coat of arms
- Location of Langatte
- Location within France Location within Grand Est
- Coordinates: 48°45′24″N 6°58′54″E
- Country: France
- Region: Grand Est
- Department: Moselle
- Arrondissement: Sarrebourg-Château-Salins
- Canton: Sarrebourg
- Intercommunality: Sarrebourg - Moselle Sud

Government
  - Mayor (2020–2026): Bernard Simon
- Area^{1}: 12.97 km^{2} (5.01 sq mi)
- Elevation: 260 m (850 ft)
- Highest elevation: 307 m (1,007 ft)
- Lowest elevation: 256 m (840 ft)
- Population (2023): 627
  - Density: 48.3/km^{2} (125/sq mi)
- Time zone: UTC+01:00 (CET)
  - Summer (DST): UTC+02:00 (CEST)
- INSEE/Postal code: 57382 /57400
- ^{1} French Land Register data, which excludes lakes, ponds, glaciers > 1 km^{2} (0.386 sq mi or 247 acres) and river estuaries.

Langatte (French pronunciation: [lɑ̃ɡat]; German: Langd; Lorraine Franconian Lan(g)d) is a commune in the Moselle department in Grand Est in north-eastern France. In 1805 it was the site of the Battle of Landbach between the French and the anti French coalition.

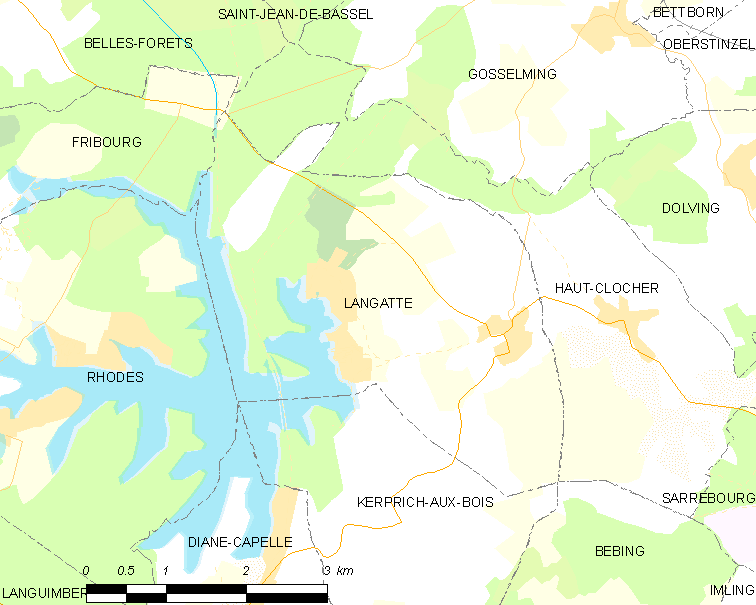
Map of Langatte

Langatte is located in Southeastern Moselle near Sarrebourg. It is one of the communes that share the Étang du Stock (a pond) with Kerprich-aux-Bois, Diane-Capelle, Rhodes and Fribourg. A leisure centre and a campsite have been installed near the pond. The new LGV Est part connecting Baudrecourt (where the High Speed Line ended before 2016) and Vendenheim has been built in Southern Moselle including Langatte and since 2016, TGV trains pass by here every day to connect Strasbourg, Paris and other destinations around France and Germany.

== Notable people ==
- René François Rohrbacher

== See also ==
- Communes of the Moselle department
