= Yves F. Barbaza =

WW1 French flying ace

Yves Félix Barbaza
- Born: 28 May 1893; Port Said, Egypt
- Died: 26 February 1971 (aged 77); Paris, France
- Military career
- Allegiance: France
- Branch: French Army
- Service years: 1911–1919
- Rank: Sous-lieutenant
- Units: 7e régiment de dragons Escadrille N 38; Escadrille N 77/SPA 77; Escadrille SPA 89
- Conflicts: World War I
- Awards: Legion d'honneur Croix de guerre

Sous-Lieutenant Yves Félix François Marie Barbaza (28 May 1893 – 26 February 1971) was a French World War I flying ace, credited with five aerial victories.

== Early life and military service ==
Barbaza was born in Port Said, Egypt, the son of Joseph Barbaza and Elise Gredy. In October 1911 he enlisted into the French Army as a three year volunteer, to serve in the 7e régiment de dragons He was promoted to brigadier in June 1912, and to maréchal-des-logis in September 1913.

== World War I ==
During World War I Barbaza served in his regiment until 15 January 1916, when he was transferred to the Aéronautique Militaire as a trainee pilot. He was awarded military pilot certificate no. 3060 at the military flying school at Buc on 25 March 1916, then received further instruction at the military flying school at Avord, and the aerial gunnery school at Cazaux, before completing his training at Pau on 30 June 1916.

He was posted to Escadrille N 38 at the end of July 1916, but was transferred to Escadrille N 77 on 10 September 1916. He forced an enemy a two-seater to land south of Étain, Meuse, on 25 October 1916, for which he received a citation on 27 December, and on 10 December he destroyed an LVG over Autry, Ardennes for his first credited victory. Barbaza was promoted to adjudant on 25 August 1917, and was commissioned as a temporary sous-lieutenant on 26 January 1918.

On 24 March Capitaine Pierre Mouronval, Lieutenant John Pierre Battle, and Sous-lieutenant Barbaza destroyed an observation balloon north of Quessy, Aisne. His promotion to sous-lieutenant was made substantive on 1 July, and on 18 July Barbaza and Maréchal-des-logis Albert Armangué shot down an enemy aircraft over Armentières. Finally, on 15 September 1918, a patrol consisting of Sous-lieutenants Barbaza and Maurice Boyau, and Adjudant Emile Strohl, led by Lieutenant Henri Decoin, destroyed two balloons over La Haie-des-Allemands and Foulcrey, Moselle, within twenty minutes, bringing Barbaza's number of victories to five.

Barbaza was made a Chevalier of the Légion d'honneur on 8 July 1918. His citation read:

"An officer of high morals and resolute bravery. For two years his has rendered innumerable services in the army corps and fighter aviation. After having executed numerous photographic missions, especially during the battle of Verdun, which he spent in a escadrille de chasse where he immediately asserted himself by his energy and high consciousness of devotion. A remarkable patrol leader who has numerous combats, often far behind German lines. On 15 September 1918, he flamed two balloons."

He also received the Croix de Guerre with three palms and the étoile de Vermeil ("silver-gilt star").

Post-war, Barbaza briefly served in Escadrille SPA 89 in April 1919, and was demobilized on 1 August 1919. He remained in the reserve, in which he was promoted to lieutenant on 1 June 1921. He finally left the reserve on 28 May 1946, and died in Paris on 26 February 1971.
