= Belles-Forêts =

- Commune
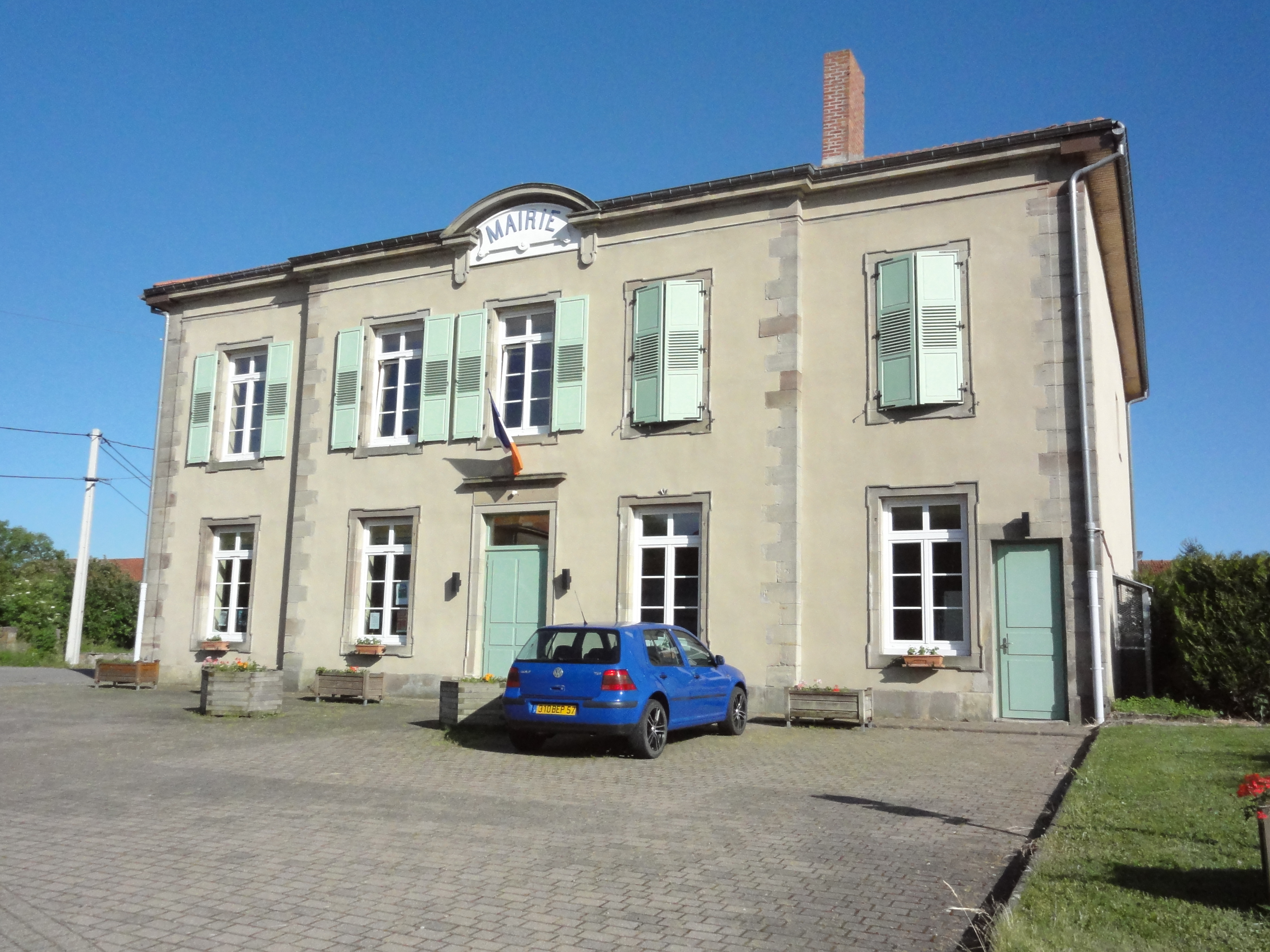
- The town hall in Belles-Forêts

- Coat of arms
- Location of Belles-Forêts
- Location within France Location within Grand Est
- Coordinates: 48°48′23″N 6°53′34″E
- Country: France
- Region: Grand Est
- Department: Moselle
- Arrondissement: Sarrebourg-Château-Salins
- Canton: Sarrebourg
- Intercommunality: Sarrebourg - Moselle Sud

Government
  - Mayor (2020–2026): Marina Husson
- Area^{1}: 26.57 km^{2} (10.26 sq mi)
- Elevation: 230 m (750 ft)
- Highest elevation: 290 m (950 ft)
- Lowest elevation: 215 m (705 ft)
- Population (2023): 224
  - Density: 8.43/km^{2} (21.8/sq mi)
- Time zone: UTC+01:00 (CET)
  - Summer (DST): UTC+02:00 (CEST)
- INSEE/Postal code: 57086 /57930
- ^{1} French Land Register data, which excludes lakes, ponds, glaciers > 1 km^{2} (0.386 sq mi or 247 acres) and river estuaries.

Belles-Forêts (French pronunciation: [bɛl fɔʁɛ]) is a commune in the Moselle department in Grand Est in northeastern France.
This commune was created in 1973 by the fusion of: Angviller-lès-Bisping (German: Angweiler), Bisping (German: Bisping) and Desseling (German: Disselingen) (till 1986).

== Population ==
Historical population
Year	Pop.	±% p.a.
1968	280	—
1975	231	−2.71%
1982	227	−0.25%
1990	242	+0.80%
1999	238	−0.19%
2007	258	+1.01%
2012	247	−0.87%
2017	245	−0.16%
2023	224	−1.48%
Source: INSEE

== See also ==
- Communes of the Moselle department
- Parc naturel régional de Lorraine
