= Gondrexange =

- Commune
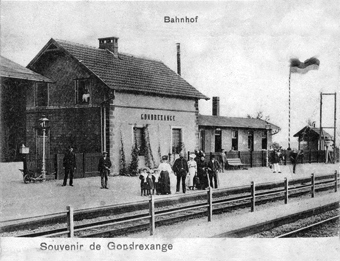
- The railway station in Gondrexange

- Coat of arms
- Location of Gondrexange
- Location within France Location within Grand Est
- Coordinates: 48°41′06″N 6°55′42″E
- Country: France
- Region: Grand Est
- Department: Moselle
- Arrondissement: Sarrebourg-Château-Salins
- Canton: Sarrebourg
- Intercommunality: Sarrebourg - Moselle Sud

Government
  - Mayor (2020–2026): Alain Staub
- Area^{1}: 22.88 km^{2} (8.83 sq mi)
- Elevation: 270 m (890 ft)
- Highest elevation: 319 m (1,047 ft)
- Lowest elevation: 266 m (873 ft)
- Population (2023): 503
  - Density: 22.0/km^{2} (56.9/sq mi)
- Time zone: UTC+01:00 (CET)
  - Summer (DST): UTC+02:00 (CEST)
- INSEE/Postal code: 57253 /57815
- ^{1} French Land Register data, which excludes lakes, ponds, glaciers > 1 km^{2} (0.386 sq mi or 247 acres) and river estuaries.

Gondrexange (French pronunciation: [ɡɔ̃dʁɛksɑ̃ʒ]; German: Gunderchingen) is a commune in the Moselle department in Grand Est in north-eastern France.

== Geography ==
This municipality is located in the historic region of Lorraine and is part of the pays de Sarrebourg.

The Gondrexange stream has its source in the commune of Réchicourt-le-Château and flows into the Saar at Imling, after passing through seven communes.

Gondrexange is part of the Lorraine Regional Natural Park.

Although the commune is crossed by the Paris-Strasbourg railway line, its train station is nowadays closed.

== Toponymy ==
Former names: 1240 : Gundersingen, 1246: Guntersingen, 1401–1402: Gunnedrakin, Gunnedrekin et Gunedrekin, 1460: Gondresenges, Gunderchingen et Gundeschingen, 1461: Gondressanges, 1519: Gondrechingen, 1751: Gunderichingen seu Gondrechanges, 1793: Gondrexauge, 1801: Gondrexange, 1915–1918 et 1940–1944: Gunderchingen.

== See also ==
- Communes of the Moselle department
- Parc naturel régional de Lorraine
