= Buhl-Lorraine =

- Commune
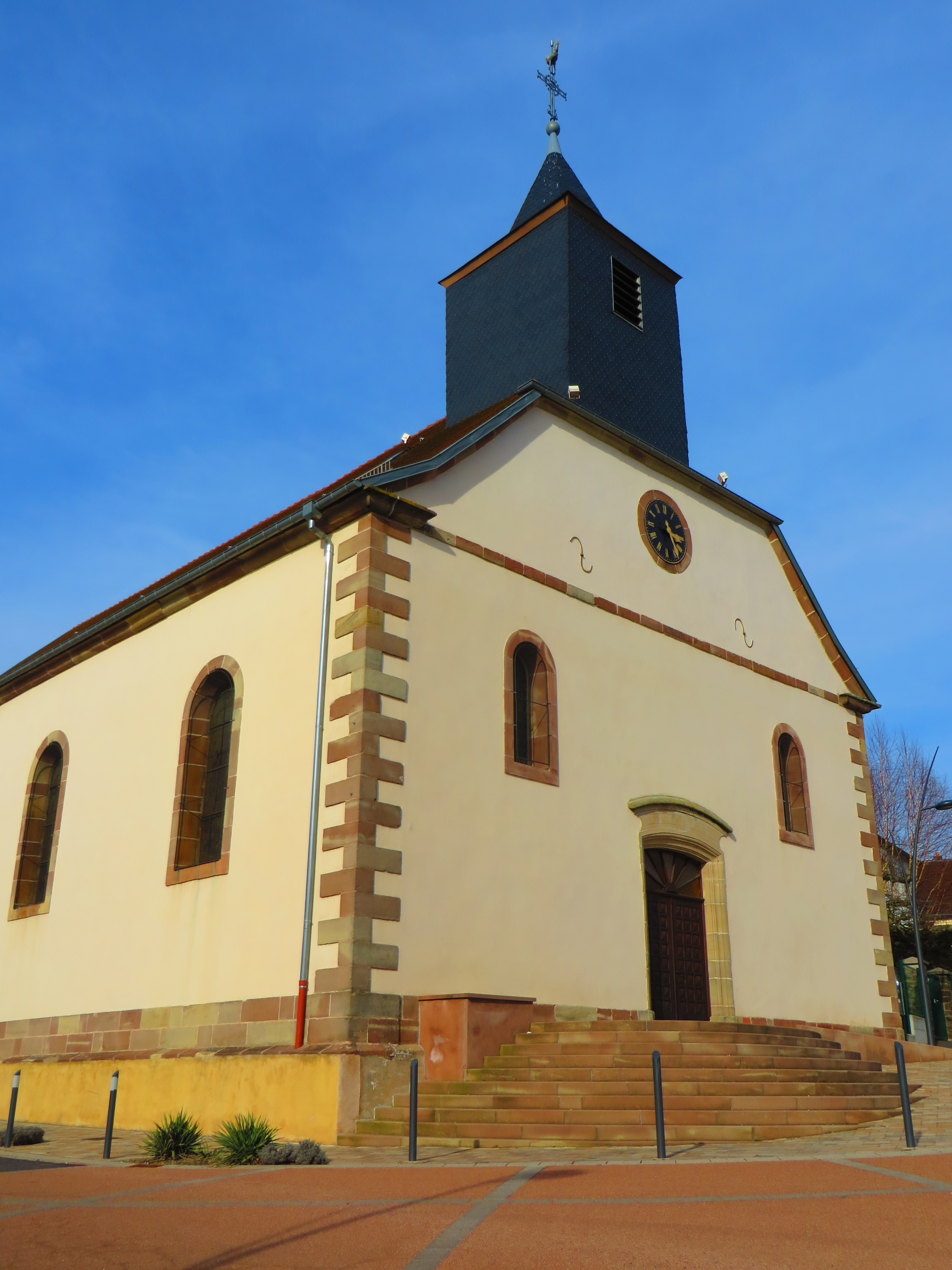
- The church in Buhl-Lorraine

- Coat of arms
- Location of Buhl-Lorraine
- Location within France Location within Grand Est
- Coordinates: 48°43′31″N 7°05′07″E
- Country: France
- Region: Grand Est
- Department: Moselle
- Arrondissement: Sarrebourg-Château-Salins
- Canton: Sarrebourg

Government
  - Mayor (2020–2026): Franck Klein
- Area^{1}: 11.2 km^{2} (4.3 sq mi)
- Highest elevation: 325 m (1,066 ft)
- Lowest elevation: 248 m (814 ft)
- Population (2023): 1,204
  - Density: 108/km^{2} (278/sq mi)
- Time zone: UTC+01:00 (CET)
  - Summer (DST): UTC+02:00 (CEST)
- INSEE/Postal code: 57119 /57400
- ^{1} French Land Register data, which excludes lakes, ponds, glaciers > 1 km^{2} (0.386 sq mi or 247 acres) and river estuaries.

Buhl-Lorraine (French pronunciation: [byl lɔʁɛn]; German: Bühl am Kanal) is a commune in the Moselle department in Grand Est in northeastern France.

== Geography ==
The village is located in Lorraine, as its name suggests, more specifically in South Moselle.

Buhl-Lorraine is located 3 miles from Sarrebourg. Its elevation is about 260 meters.

The municipality is crossed by the Bièvre, tributary of the Saar.

== Population ==
Historical population
Year	Pop.	±% p.a.
1968	652	—
1975	768	+2.37%
1982	786	+0.33%
1990	817	+0.48%
1999	1,037	+2.68%
2007	1,118	+0.94%
2012	1,239	+2.08%
2017	1,214	−0.41%
2023	1,204	−0.14%
Source: INSEE

== Toponymy ==
The name of the village come from the germanic word, bühel or bühl, which means "hill".

Ancient names: Büle during the 15th, Buhel in 1525, Bill in 1526, Biel in 1751, Biel or Bihle in 1779, Bilh in 1790, Bille in 1793, Bühl between 1871-1918, Buhl-Lorraine in 1920, Bühl am Kanal between 1940-1944.

== See also ==
- Communes of the Moselle department
