= Haut-Clocher =

Haut-Clocher (Zittersdorf)
- Commune
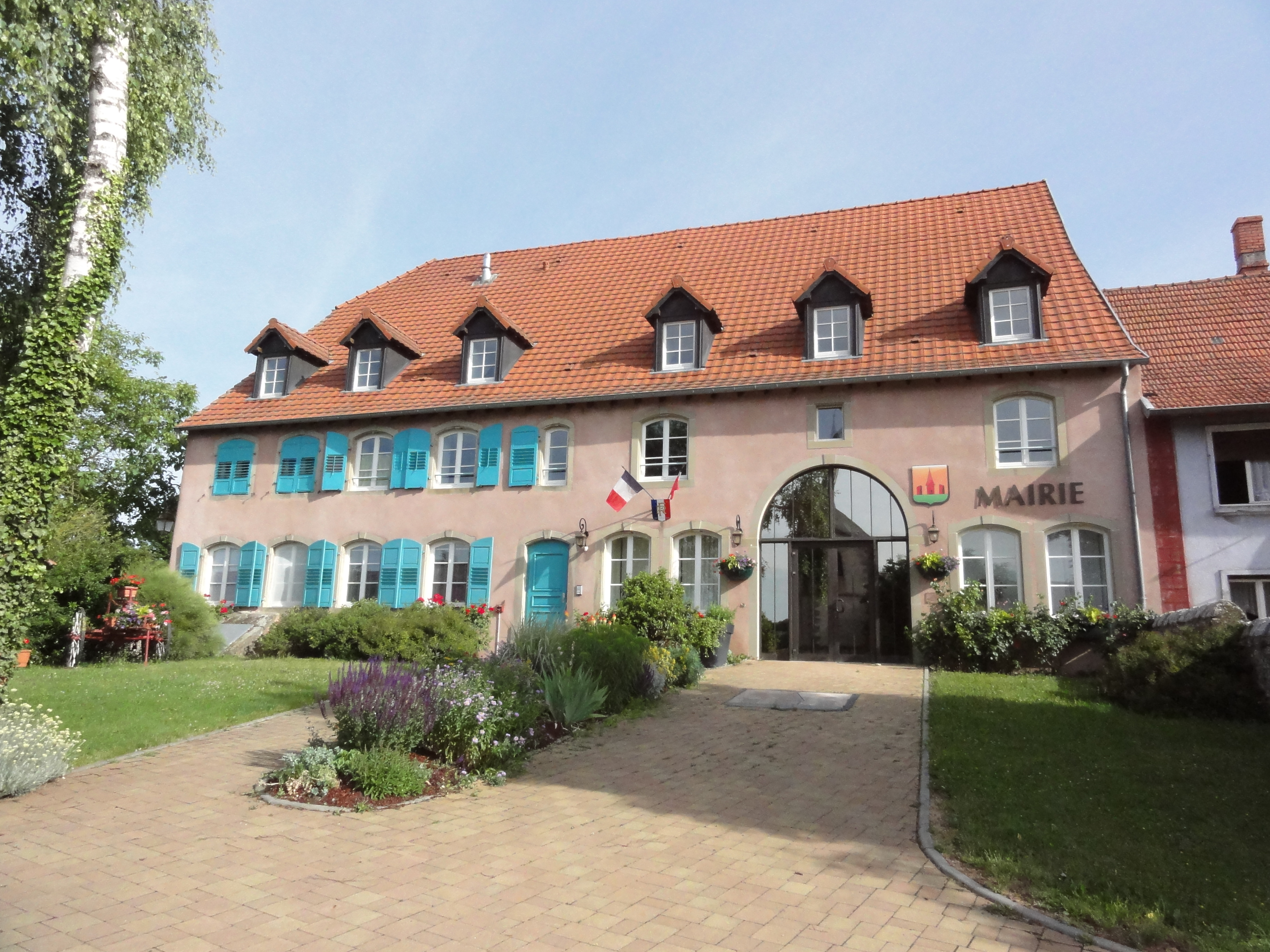
- The town hall in Haut-Clocher

- Coat of arms
- Location of Haut-Clocher (Zittersdorf)
- Location within France Location within Grand Est
- Coordinates: 48°45′34″N 7°00′05″E
- Country: France
- Region: Grand Est
- Department: Moselle
- Arrondissement: Sarrebourg-Château-Salins
- Canton: Sarrebourg
- Intercommunality: CC Sarrebourg Moselle Sud

Government
  - Mayor (2020–2026): Francis Beck
- Area^{1}: 11.44 km^{2} (4.42 sq mi)
- Elevation: 260 m (850 ft)
- Highest elevation: 315 m (1,033 ft)
- Lowest elevation: 245 m (804 ft)
- Population (2023): 340
  - Density: 30/km^{2} (77/sq mi)
- Time zone: UTC+01:00 (CET)
  - Summer (DST): UTC+02:00 (CEST)
- INSEE/Postal code: 57304 /57400
- ^{1} French Land Register data, which excludes lakes, ponds, glaciers > 1 km^{2} (0.386 sq mi or 247 acres) and river estuaries.

Haut-Clocher (French pronunciation: [o klɔʃe]; German: Zittersdorf; 1574: Sittersdorff) is a commune in the Moselle department in Grand Est in north-eastern France.

== Toponymy ==
The village was built on a hill at the top of which was a church which gave the village its name (in French, a bell tower is a "clocher" and "haut" means high.)

The French name Haut-Clocher replaced the former German name Zittersdorf.

== History ==
The commune was ruled by the seigneurs (lords) of Fénétrange, then by the bailliage of Lixheim.

== See also ==
- Communes of the Moselle department
