= Mittersheim =

- Commune
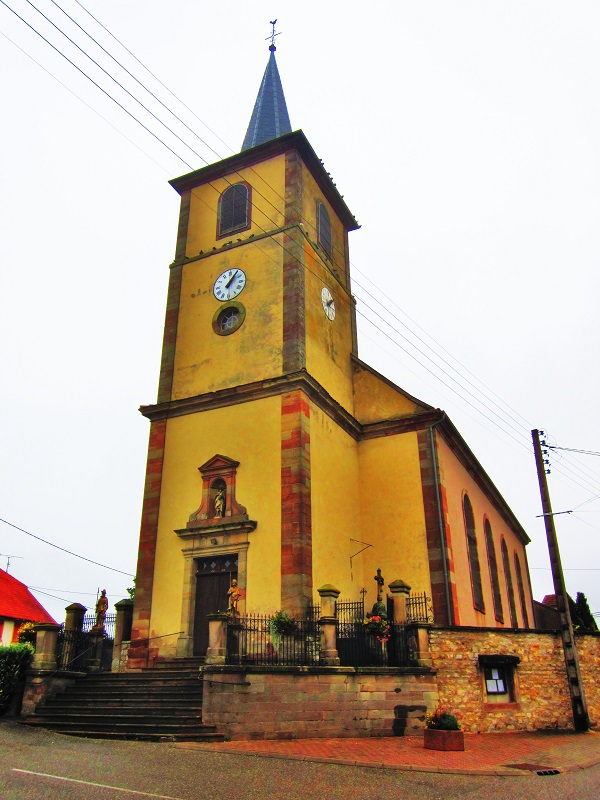
- The church of Saint-Hubert in Mittersheim

- Coat of arms
- Location of Mittersheim
- Location within France Location within Grand Est
- Coordinates: 48°51′42″N 6°56′34″E
- Country: France
- Region: Grand Est
- Department: Moselle
- Arrondissement: Sarrebourg-Château-Salins
- Canton: Sarrebourg
- Intercommunality: Sarrebourg - Moselle Sud

Government
  - Mayor (2020–2026): Jean-Luc Huber
- Area^{1}: 16.77 km^{2} (6.47 sq mi)
- Elevation: 240 m (790 ft)
- Highest elevation: 272 m (892 ft)
- Lowest elevation: 221 m (725 ft)
- Population (2023): 583
  - Density: 34.8/km^{2} (90.0/sq mi)
- Time zone: UTC+01:00 (CET)
  - Summer (DST): UTC+02:00 (CEST)
- INSEE/Postal code: 57469 /57930
- ^{1} French Land Register data, which excludes lakes, ponds, glaciers > 1 km^{2} (0.386 sq mi or 247 acres) and river estuaries.

Mittersheim (French pronunciation: [mitəʁsaim]) is a commune in the Moselle department in Grand Est in north-eastern France.

== See also ==
- Communes of the Moselle department
- Parc naturel régional de Lorraine
