= Moussey, Moselle =

Moussey
- Commune
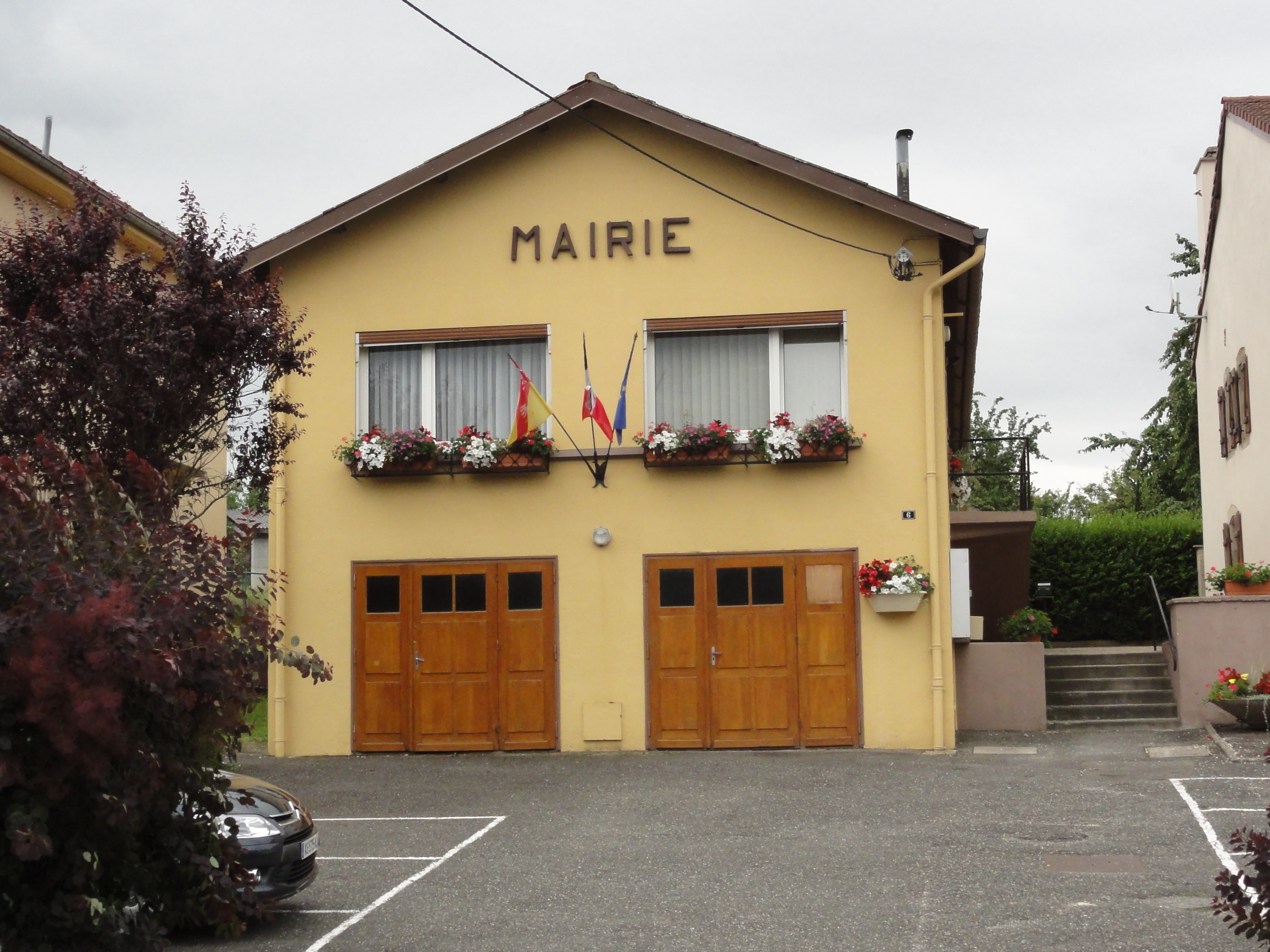
- The town hall in Moussey

- Coat of arms
- Location of Moussey
- Location within France Location within Grand Est
- Coordinates: 48°40′28″N 6°47′00″E
- Country: France
- Region: Grand Est
- Department: Moselle
- Arrondissement: Sarrebourg-Château-Salins
- Canton: Sarrebourg
- Intercommunality: Sarrebourg - Moselle Sud

Government
  - Mayor (2020–2026): Hervé Morque
- Area^{1}: 7.89 km^{2} (3.05 sq mi)
- Elevation: 250 m (820 ft)
- Highest elevation: 280 m (920 ft)
- Lowest elevation: 236 m (774 ft)
- Population (2023): 559
  - Density: 70.8/km^{2} (183/sq mi)
- Time zone: UTC+01:00 (CET)
  - Summer (DST): UTC+02:00 (CEST)
- INSEE/Postal code: 57488 /57770
- ^{1} French Land Register data, which excludes lakes, ponds, glaciers > 1 km^{2} (0.386 sq mi or 247 acres) and river estuaries.

Moussey (French pronunciation: [musɛ]; German: Mulsach) is a commune in the Moselle department in Grand Est in north-eastern France.

== See also ==
- Communes of the Moselle department
- Parc naturel régional de Lorraine
