= Gosselming =

- Commune
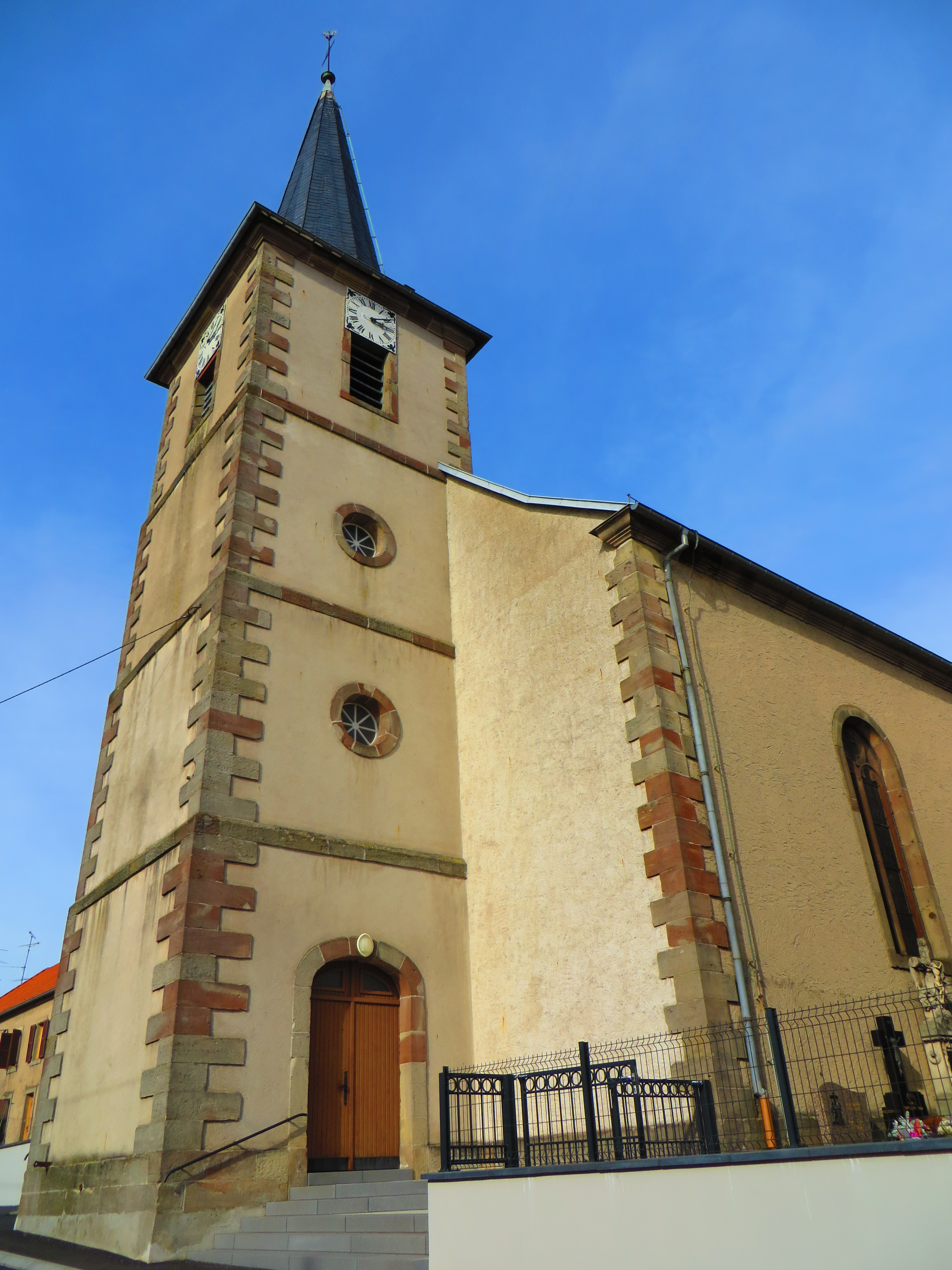
- The church in Gosselming

- Coat of arms
- Location of Gosselming
- Location within France Location within Grand Est
- Coordinates: 48°47′33″N 7°00′12″E
- Country: France
- Region: Grand Est
- Department: Moselle
- Arrondissement: Sarrebourg-Château-Salins
- Canton: Sarrebourg
- Intercommunality: Sarrebourg - Moselle Sud

Government
  - Mayor (2020–2026): Jacky Hick
- Area^{1}: 10.15 km^{2} (3.92 sq mi)
- Elevation: 300 m (980 ft)
- Highest elevation: 285 m (935 ft)
- Lowest elevation: 232 m (761 ft)
- Population (2023): 572
  - Density: 56.4/km^{2} (146/sq mi)
- Time zone: UTC+01:00 (CET)
  - Summer (DST): UTC+02:00 (CEST)
- INSEE/Postal code: 57255 /57930
- ^{1} French Land Register data, which excludes lakes, ponds, glaciers > 1 km^{2} (0.386 sq mi or 247 acres) and river estuaries.

Gosselming (German: Gosselmingen) is a commune in the Moselle department in Grand Est in north-eastern France.

== See also ==
- Communes of the Moselle department
