= Romelfing =

- Commune
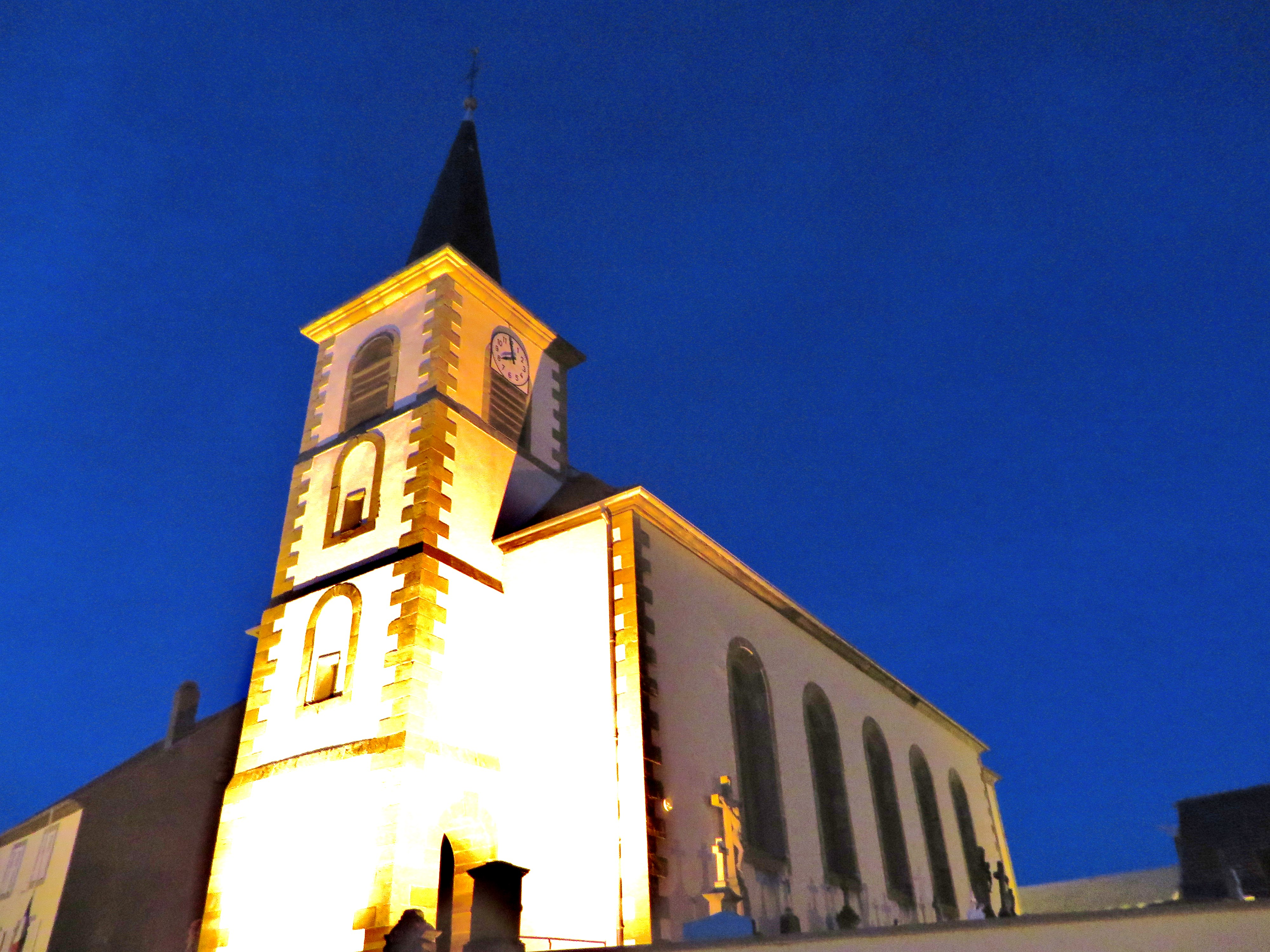
- The church in Romelfing

- Coat of arms
- Location of Romelfing
- Location within France Location within Grand Est
- Coordinates: 48°49′51″N 7°01′33″E
- Country: France
- Region: Grand Est
- Department: Moselle
- Arrondissement: Sarrebourg-Château-Salins
- Canton: Sarrebourg
- Intercommunality: Sarrebourg - Moselle Sud

Government
  - Mayor (2020–2026): Bernard Weinling
- Area^{1}: 10.69 km^{2} (4.13 sq mi)
- Elevation: 254 m (833 ft)
- Highest elevation: 307 m (1,007 ft)
- Lowest elevation: 227 m (745 ft)
- Population (2023): 328
  - Density: 30.7/km^{2} (79.5/sq mi)
- Time zone: UTC+01:00 (CET)
  - Summer (DST): UTC+02:00 (CEST)
- INSEE/Postal code: 57592 /57930
- ^{1} French Land Register data, which excludes lakes, ponds, glaciers > 1 km^{2} (0.386 sq mi or 247 acres) and river estuaries.

Romelfing (French pronunciation: [ʁɔməlfɛ̃]; German: Rommelfingen) is a commune in the Moselle department in Grand Est in north-eastern France.

== See also ==
- Communes of the Moselle department
