= Canton of Sarrebourg =

Coordinates: 48.73°N 7.05°E

The canton of Sarrebourg is an administrative division of the Moselle department, northeastern France. Its borders were modified at the French canton reorganisation which came into effect in March 2015. Its seat is in Sarrebourg.

It consists of the following communes:

1. Assenoncourt
2. Avricourt
3. Azoudange
4. Bébing
5. Belles-Forêts
6. Berthelming
7. Bettborn
8. Bickenholtz
9. Buhl-Lorraine
10. Desseling
11. Diane-Capelle
12. Dolving
13. Fénétrange
14. Fleisheim
15. Foulcrey
16. Fribourg
17. Gondrexange
18. Gosselming
19. Guermange
20. Haut-Clocher
21. Hellering-lès-Fénétrange
22. Hertzing
23. Hilbesheim
24. Hommarting
25. Ibigny
26. Imling
27. Kerprich-aux-Bois
28. Langatte
29. Languimberg
30. Mittersheim
31. Moussey
32. Niederstinzel
33. Oberstinzel
34. Postroff
35. Réchicourt-le-Château
36. Réding
37. Rhodes
38. Richeval
39. Romelfing
40. Saint-Georges
41. Saint-Jean-de-Bassel
42. Sarraltroff
43. Sarrebourg
44. Schalbach
45. Veckersviller
46. Vieux-Lixheim
