= Ibigny =

- Commune
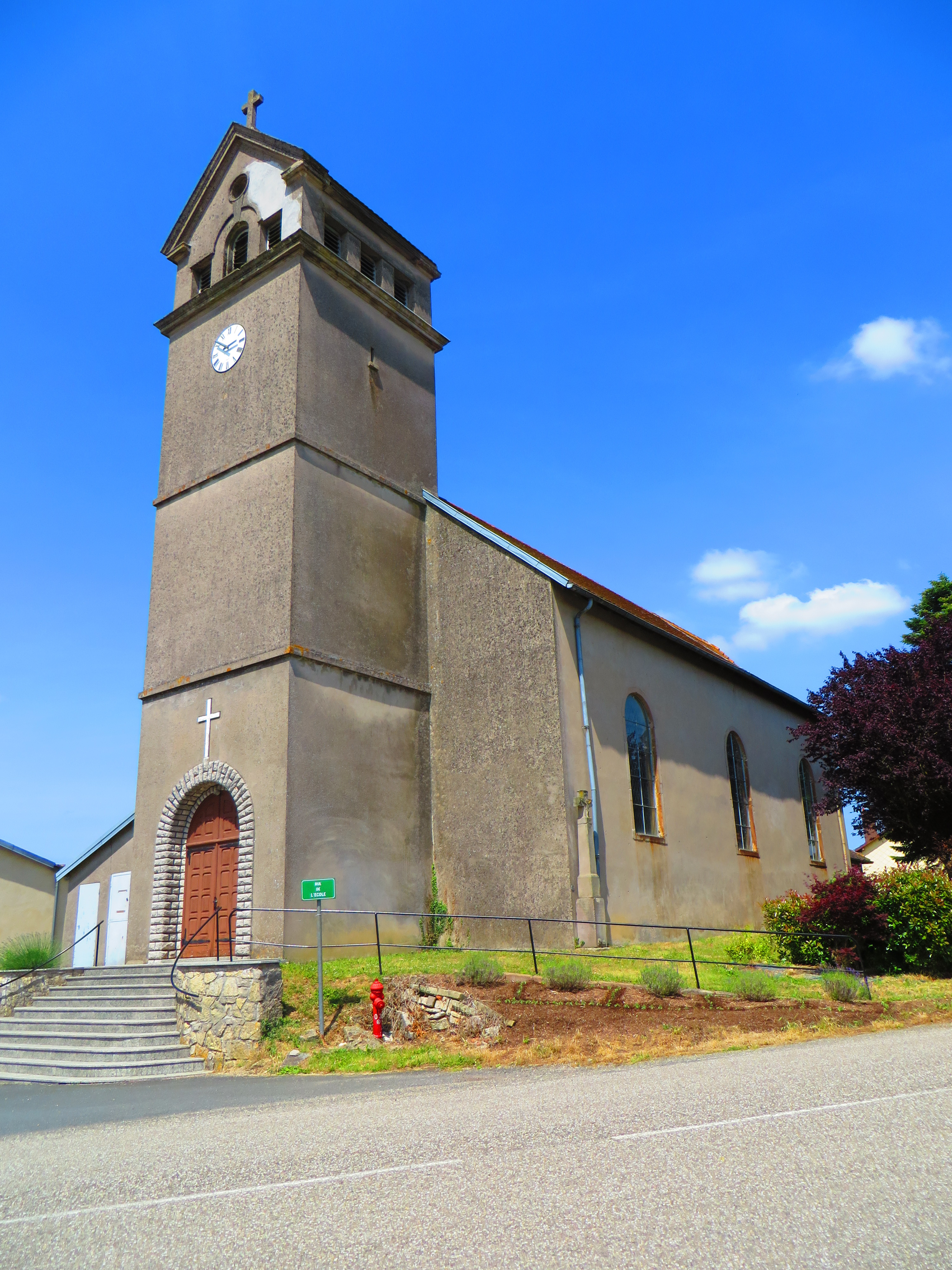
- The church in Ibigny

- Coat of arms
- Location of Ibigny
- Location within France Location within Grand Est
- Coordinates: 48°38′38″N 6°54′01″E
- Country: France
- Region: Grand Est
- Department: Moselle
- Arrondissement: Sarrebourg-Château-Salins
- Canton: Sarrebourg
- Intercommunality: Sarrebourg - Moselle Sud

Government
  - Mayor (2020–2026): Didier Georges
- Area^{1}: 4.77 km^{2} (1.84 sq mi)
- Elevation: 315 m (1,033 ft)
- Highest elevation: 341 m (1,119 ft)
- Lowest elevation: 285 m (935 ft)
- Population (2023): 90
  - Density: 19/km^{2} (49/sq mi)
- Time zone: UTC+01:00 (CET)
  - Summer (DST): UTC+02:00 (CEST)
- INSEE/Postal code: 57342 /57830
- ^{1} French Land Register data, which excludes lakes, ponds, glaciers > 1 km^{2} (0.386 sq mi or 247 acres) and river estuaries.

Ibigny (French pronunciation: [ibiɲi]; German: Ibingen) is a commune in the Moselle department in Grand Est in north-eastern France.

== Population ==
Historical population
Year	Pop.	±% p.a.
1968	122	—
1975	117	−0.60%
1982	95	−2.93%
1990	85	−1.38%
1999	88	+0.39%
2007	90	+0.28%
2012	104	+2.93%
2017	97	−1.38%
2023	90	−1.24%
Source: INSEE

== See also ==
- Communes of the Moselle department
