= Bébing =

- Commune
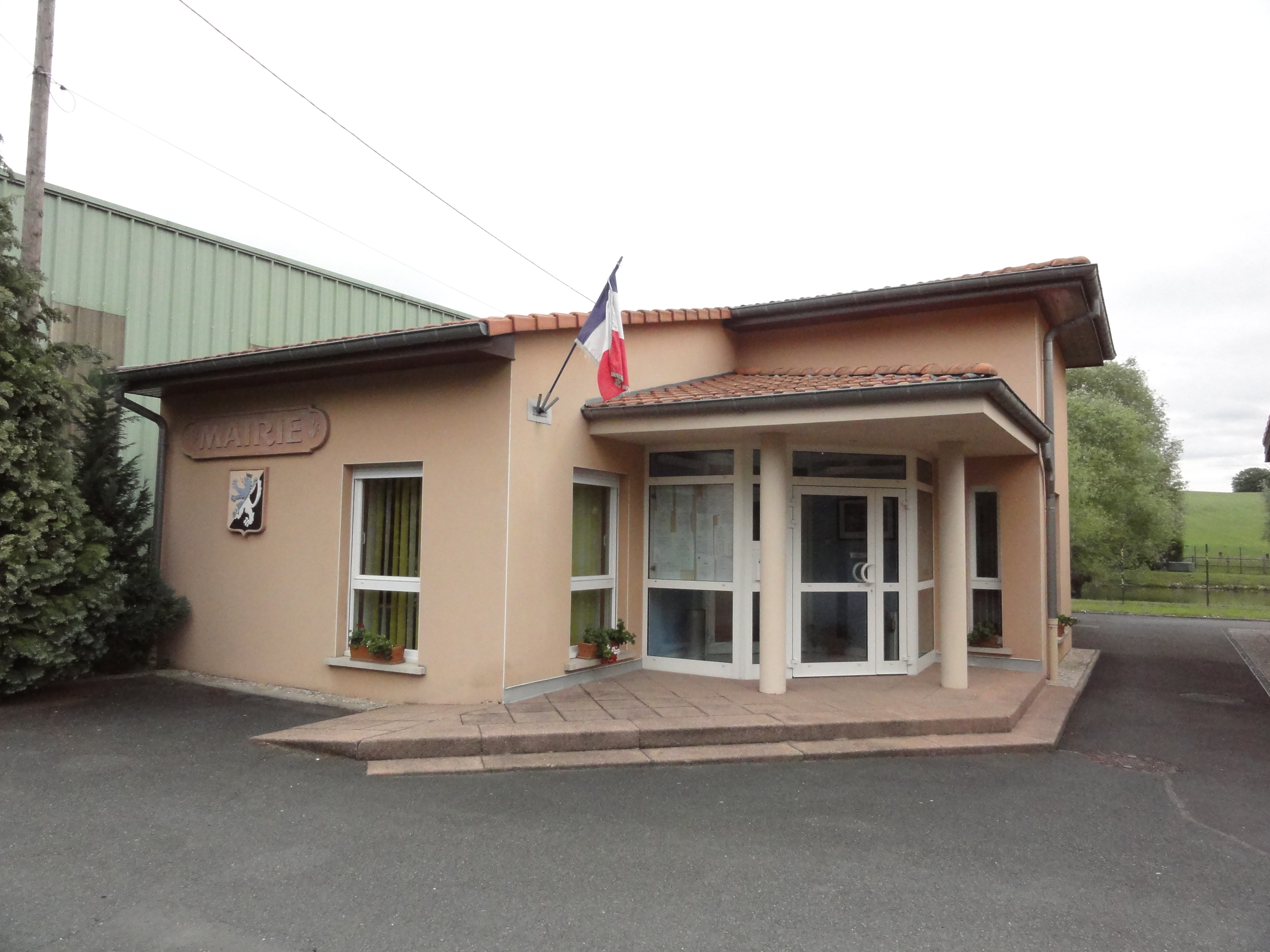
- The town hall in Bébing

- Coat of arms
- Location of Bébing
- Location within France Location within Grand Est
- Coordinates: 48°42′46″N 6°59′50″E
- Country: France
- Region: Grand Est
- Department: Moselle
- Arrondissement: Sarrebourg-Château-Salins
- Canton: Sarrebourg

Government
  - Mayor (2024–2026): Kristina Leinen
- Area^{1}: 9.57 km^{2} (3.69 sq mi)
- Elevation: 230 m (750 ft)
- Highest elevation: 324 m (1,063 ft)
- Lowest elevation: 258 m (846 ft)
- Population (2023): 189
  - Density: 19.7/km^{2} (51.2/sq mi)
- Time zone: UTC+01:00 (CET)
  - Summer (DST): UTC+02:00 (CEST)
- INSEE/Postal code: 57056 /57830
- ^{1} French Land Register data, which excludes lakes, ponds, glaciers > 1 km^{2} (0.386 sq mi or 247 acres) and river estuaries.

Bébing (French pronunciation: [bebɛ̃]; German: Bebing) is a commune in the Moselle department in Grand Est in northeastern France.

== Population ==
Historical population
Year	Pop.	±% p.a.
1968	97	—
1975	124	+3.57%
1982	160	+3.71%
1990	179	+1.41%
1999	167	−0.77%
2007	172	+0.37%
2012	165	−0.83%
2017	201	+4.03%
2023	189	−1.02%
Source: INSEE

== See also ==
- Communes of the Moselle department
