= Guermange =

- Commune
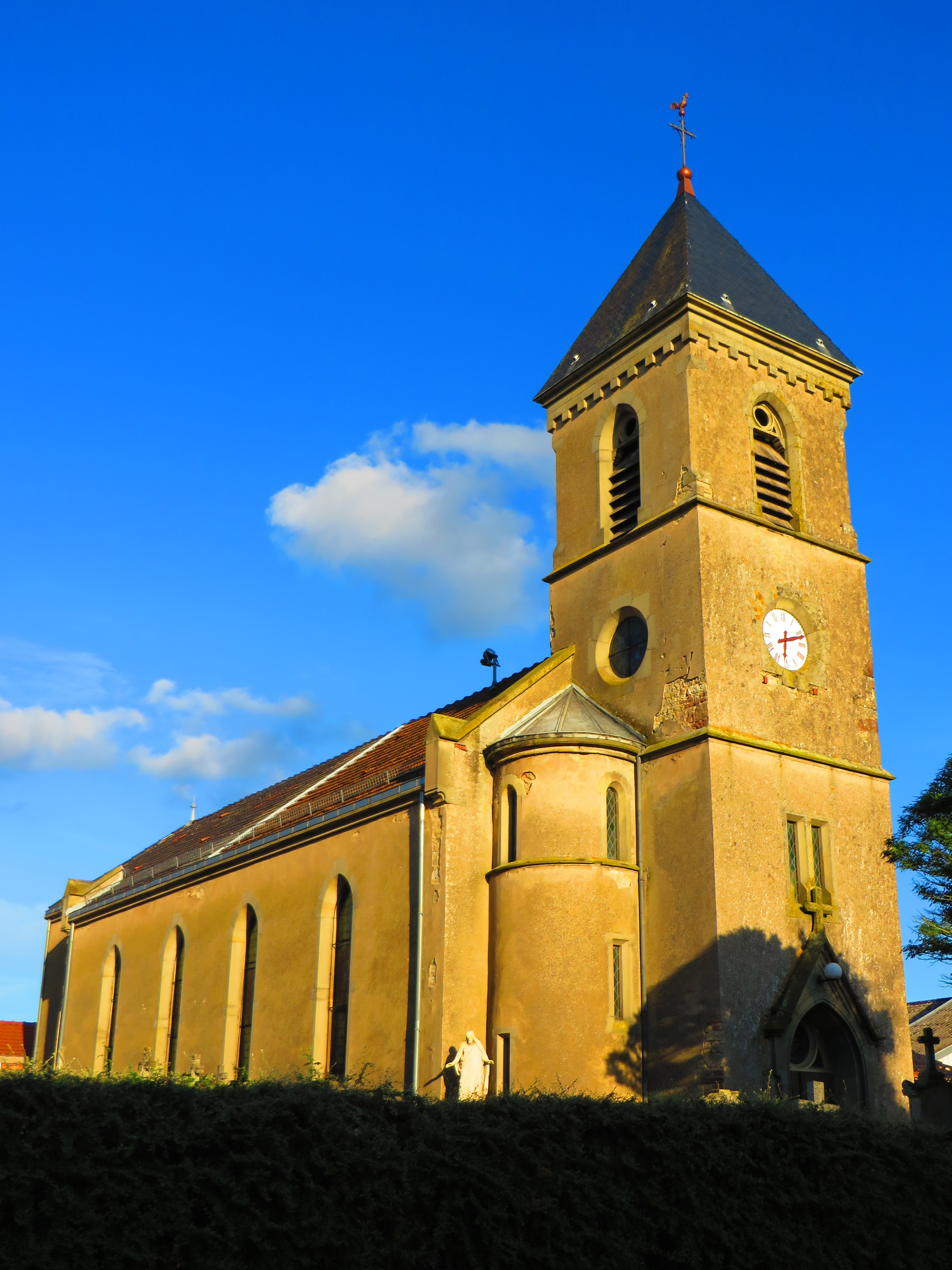
- The church in Guermange

- Coat of arms
- Location of Guermange
- Location within France Location within Grand Est
- Coordinates: 48°47′43″N 6°48′44″E
- Country: France
- Region: Grand Est
- Department: Moselle
- Arrondissement: Sarrebourg-Château-Salins
- Canton: Sarrebourg
- Intercommunality: Sarrebourg - Moselle Sud

Government
  - Mayor (2020–2026): Roland Assel
- Area^{1}: 18.72 km^{2} (7.23 sq mi)
- Elevation: 215 m (705 ft)
- Highest elevation: 215 m (705 ft)
- Lowest elevation: 215 m (705 ft)
- Population (2023): 95
  - Density: 5.1/km^{2} (13/sq mi)
- Time zone: UTC+01:00 (CET)
  - Summer (DST): UTC+02:00 (CEST)
- INSEE/Postal code: 57272 /57260
- ^{1} French Land Register data, which excludes lakes, ponds, glaciers > 1 km^{2} (0.386 sq mi or 247 acres) and river estuaries.

Guermange (French pronunciation: [ɡɛʁmɑ̃ʒ]; German: Germingen) is a commune in the Moselle department in Grand Est in north-eastern France.

== See also ==
- Communes of the Moselle department
- Parc naturel régional de Lorraine
