= Bettborn, Moselle =

Bettborn
- Commune
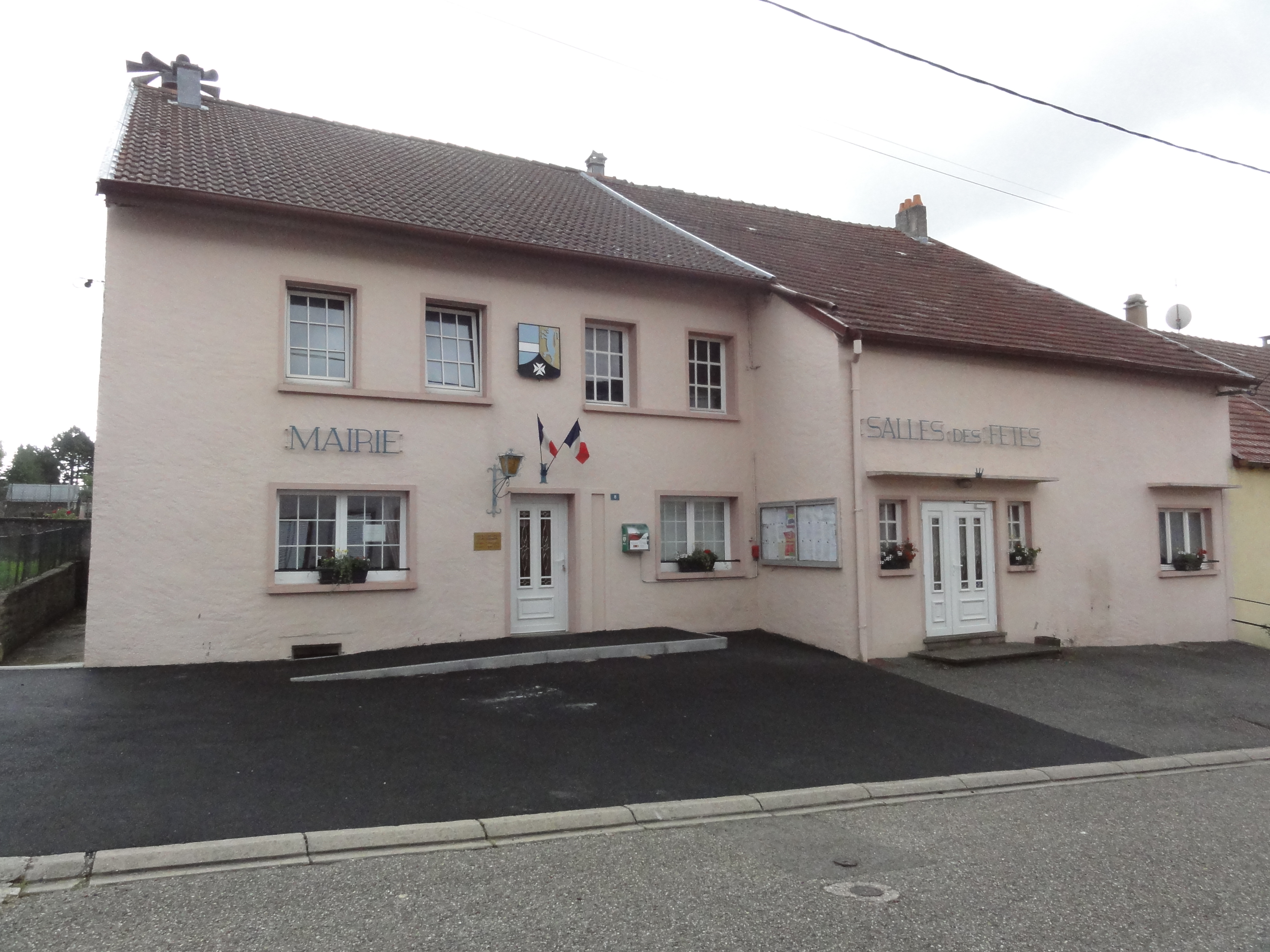
- The town hall in Bettborn

- Coat of arms
- Location of Bettborn
- Location within France Location within Grand Est
- Coordinates: 48°48′06″N 7°01′20″E
- Country: France
- Region: Grand Est
- Department: Moselle
- Arrondissement: Sarrebourg-Château-Salins
- Canton: Sarrebourg
- Intercommunality: Sarrebourg Moselle Sud

Government
  - Mayor (2020–2026): Pascal Martin
- Area^{1}: 6.57 km^{2} (2.54 sq mi)
- Elevation: 290 m (950 ft)
- Highest elevation: 322 m (1,056 ft)
- Lowest elevation: 232 m (761 ft)
- Population (2023): 406
  - Density: 61.8/km^{2} (160/sq mi)
- Time zone: UTC+01:00 (CET)
  - Summer (DST): UTC+02:00 (CEST)
- INSEE/Postal code: 57071 /57930
- ^{1} French Land Register data, which excludes lakes, ponds, glaciers > 1 km^{2} (0.386 sq mi or 247 acres) and river estuaries.

Bettborn (French pronunciation: [bɛtbɔʁn]; German: Bettborn) is a commune in the Moselle department in Grand Est in northeastern France.

== Toponymy ==
Former names: Bedebur in 1316, Betteburn during the 15th century, Besporn and Bettbornn (1525), Bedweiler (XVI^{e} siècle), Betboorn and Bethboren (17th century), Bettborn or Bettpert (1779).

== History ==
Bettborn was a part of the seigneury of Fénétrange-Schwanhals.

The village was destroyed during the Thirty Years' War.

== Population ==
Historical population
Year	Pop.	±% p.a.
1968	243	—
1975	246	+0.18%
1982	265	+1.07%
1990	318	+2.31%
1999	353	+1.17%
2007	413	+1.98%
2012	432	+0.90%
2017	395	−1.77%
2023	406	+0.46%
Source: INSEE

== See also ==
- Communes of the Moselle department
