= Languimberg =

- Commune
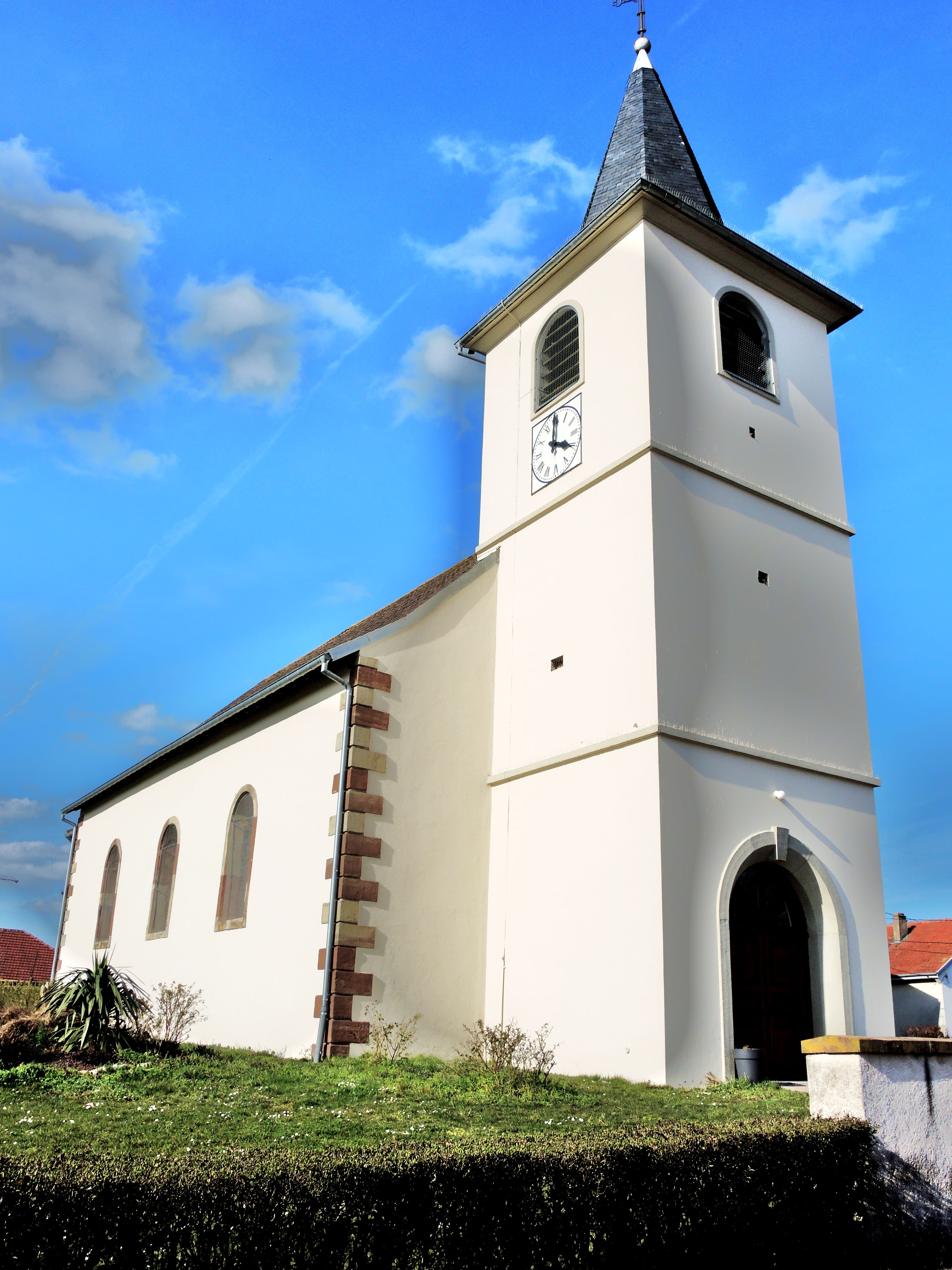
- The church in Languimberg

- Coat of arms
- Location of Languimberg
- Location within France Location within Grand Est
- Coordinates: 48°44′48″N 6°51′36″E
- Country: France
- Region: Grand Est
- Department: Moselle
- Arrondissement: Sarrebourg-Château-Salins
- Canton: Sarrebourg
- Intercommunality: Sarrebourg - Moselle Sud

Government
  - Mayor (2020–2026): Jean-Marc Wagenheim
- Area^{1}: 18.38 km^{2} (7.10 sq mi)
- Elevation: 290 m (950 ft)
- Highest elevation: 304 m (997 ft)
- Lowest elevation: 238 m (781 ft)
- Population (2023): 155
  - Density: 8.43/km^{2} (21.8/sq mi)
- Time zone: UTC+01:00 (CET)
  - Summer (DST): UTC+02:00 (CEST)
- INSEE/Postal code: 57383 /57810
- ^{1} French Land Register data, which excludes lakes, ponds, glaciers > 1 km^{2} (0.386 sq mi or 247 acres) and river estuaries.

Languimberg (French pronunciation: [lɑ̃ɡɛ̃bɛʁ]; German: Langenberg) is a commune in the Moselle department in Grand Est in north-eastern France.

== See also ==
- Communes of the Moselle department
- Parc naturel régional de Lorraine
