= Postroff =

- Commune
- Coat of arms
- Location of Postroff
- Location within France Location within Grand Est
- Coordinates: 48°51′05″N 7°04′48″E
- Country: France
- Region: Grand Est
- Department: Moselle
- Arrondissement: Sarrebourg-Château-Salins
- Canton: Sarrebourg
- Intercommunality: Sarrebourg - Moselle Sud

Government
  - Mayor (2020–2026): Ernest Holtzscherer
- Area^{1}: 5 km^{2} (1.9 sq mi)
- Elevation: 275 m (902 ft)
- Highest elevation: 334 m (1,096 ft)
- Lowest elevation: 227 m (745 ft)
- Population (2023): 196
  - Density: 39/km^{2} (100/sq mi)
- Time zone: UTC+01:00 (CET)
  - Summer (DST): UTC+02:00 (CEST)
- INSEE/Postal code: 57551 /57930
- ^{1} French Land Register data, which excludes lakes, ponds, glaciers > 1 km^{2} (0.386 sq mi or 247 acres) and river estuaries.

Postroff (French pronunciation: [pɔstʁɔf]; German: Postdorf) is a commune in the Moselle department in Grand Est, located in north-eastern France.

== See also ==
- Communes of the Moselle department
