= Saint-Georges, Moselle =

Saint-Georges
- Commune
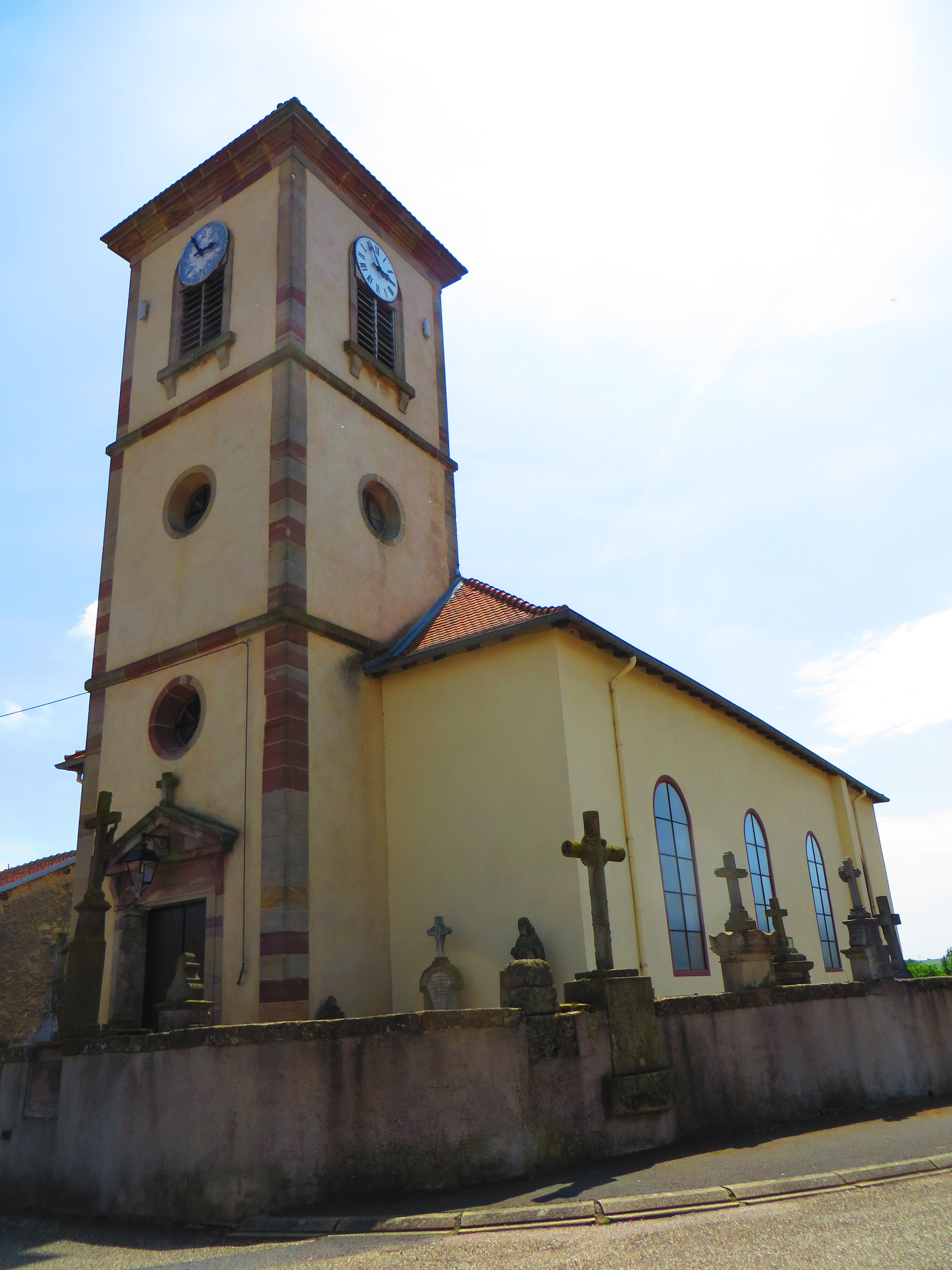
- The church in Saint-Georges

- Coat of arms
- Location of Saint-Georges
- Location within France Location within Grand Est
- Coordinates: 48°39′30″N 6°55′47″E
- Country: France
- Region: Grand Est
- Department: Moselle
- Arrondissement: Sarrebourg-Château-Salins
- Canton: Sarrebourg

Government
  - Mayor (2020–2026): Roland Gilliot
- Area^{1}: 8.1 km^{2} (3.1 sq mi)
- Elevation: 310 m (1,020 ft)
- Highest elevation: 351 m (1,152 ft)
- Lowest elevation: 279 m (915 ft)
- Population (2023): 196
  - Density: 24/km^{2} (63/sq mi)
- Time zone: UTC+01:00 (CET)
  - Summer (DST): UTC+02:00 (CEST)
- INSEE/Postal code: 57611 /57830
- ^{1} French Land Register data, which excludes lakes, ponds, glaciers > 1 km^{2} (0.386 sq mi or 247 acres) and river estuaries.

Saint-Georges (French pronunciation: [sɛ̃ ʒɔʁʒ]; German: Sankt Georg; Lorrain: Saint Jouonh) is a commune in the Moselle department in Grand Est in north-eastern France.

== See also ==
- Communes of the Moselle department
