= Schalbach =

- Commune
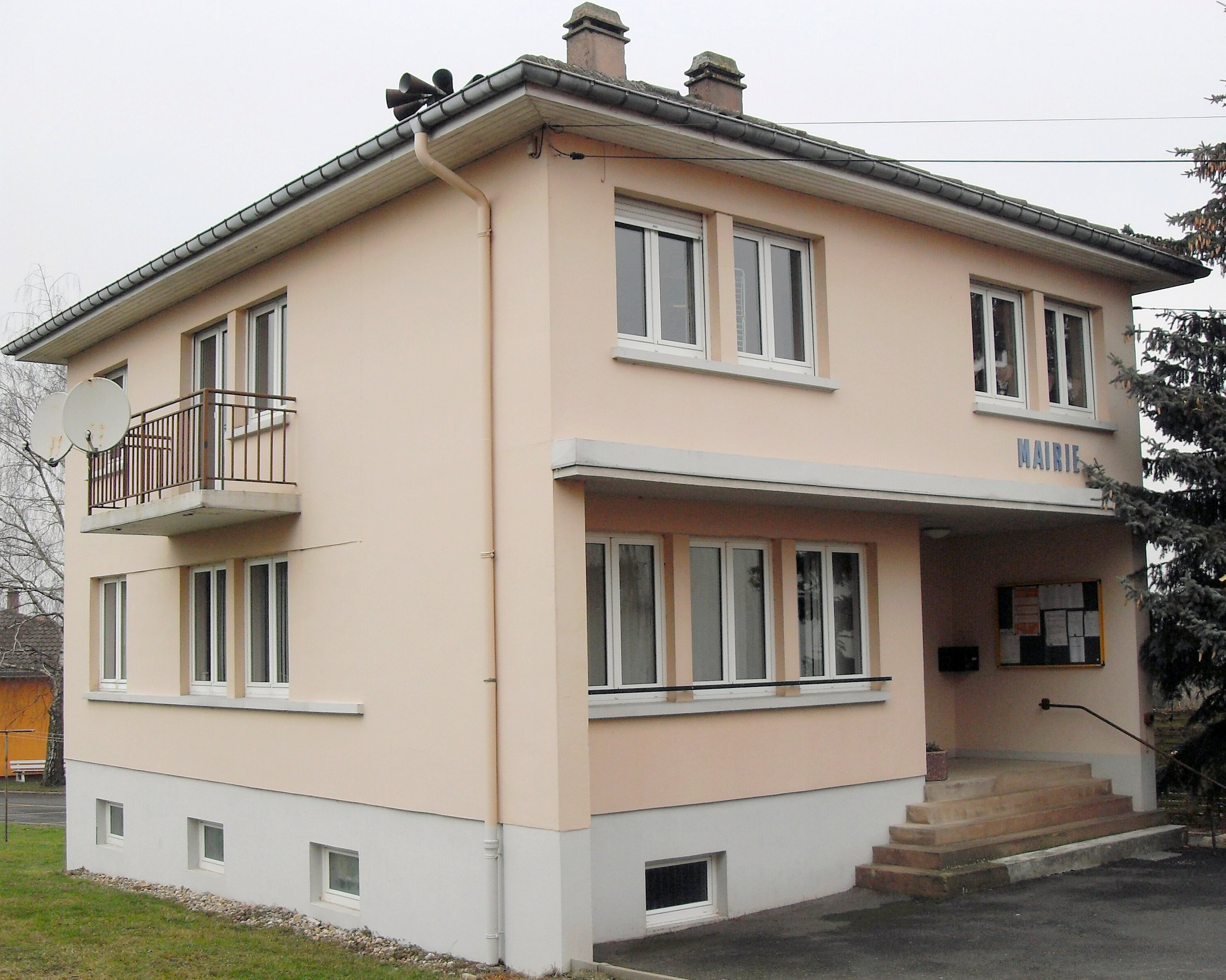
- The town hall in Schalbach

- Coat of arms
- Location of Schalbach
- Location within France Location within Grand Est
- Coordinates: 48°49′24″N 7°10′16″E
- Country: France
- Region: Grand Est
- Department: Moselle
- Arrondissement: Sarrebourg-Château-Salins
- Canton: Sarrebourg
- Intercommunality: Sarrebourg - Moselle Sud

Government
  - Mayor (2020–2026): Gilbert Burger
- Area^{1}: 12.58 km^{2} (4.86 sq mi)
- Elevation: 280 m (920 ft)
- Highest elevation: 332 m (1,089 ft)
- Lowest elevation: 262 m (860 ft)
- Population (2023): 372
  - Density: 29.6/km^{2} (76.6/sq mi)
- Time zone: UTC+01:00 (CET)
  - Summer (DST): UTC+02:00 (CEST)
- INSEE/Postal code: 57635 /57370
- ^{1} French Land Register data, which excludes lakes, ponds, glaciers > 1 km^{2} (0.386 sq mi or 247 acres) and river estuaries.

Schalbach is a commune in the Moselle department in Grand Est in north-eastern France.

== See also ==
- Communes of the Moselle department
