= Hertzing =

- Commune
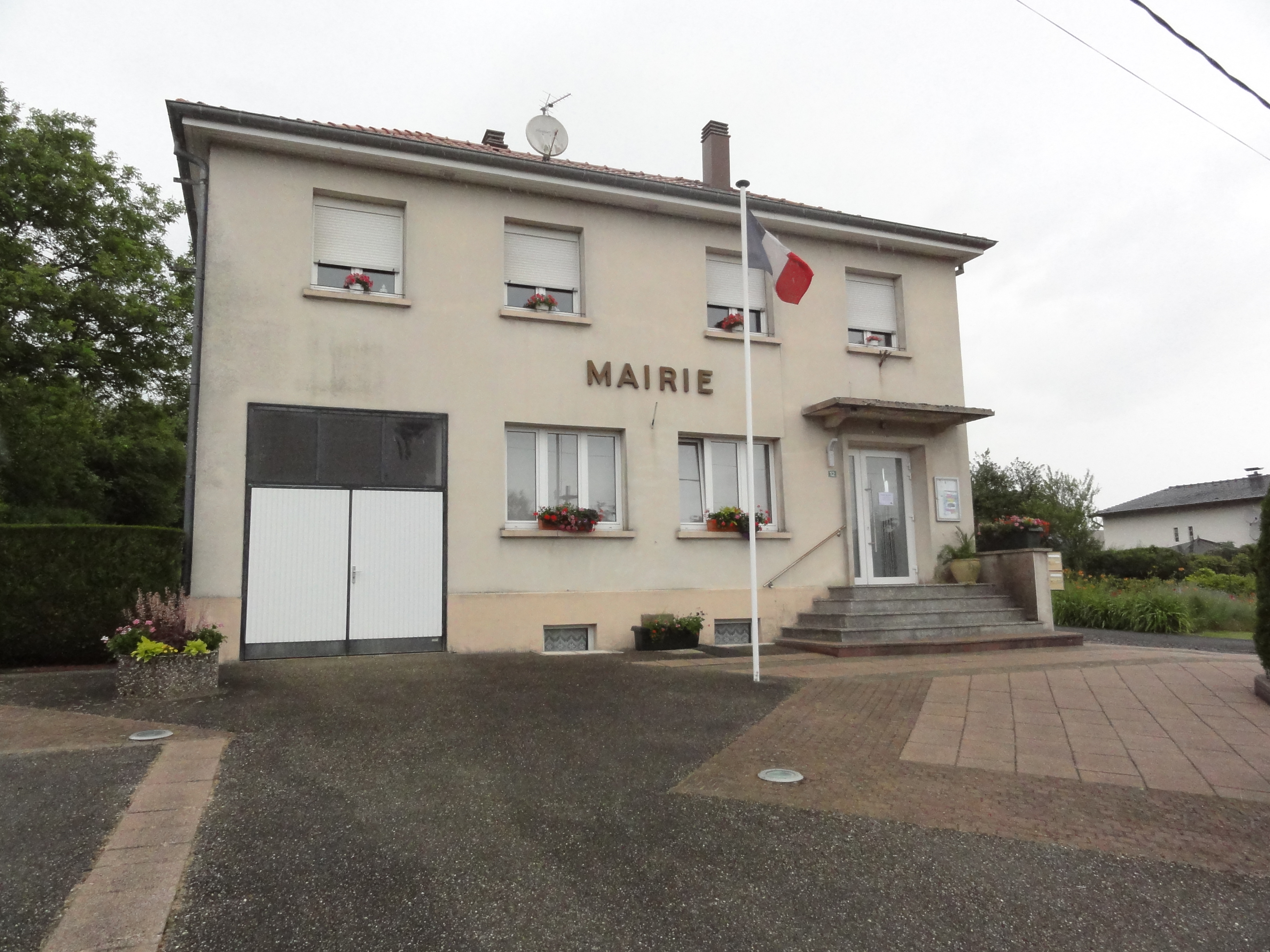
- The town hall in Hertzing

- Coat of arms
- Location of Hertzing
- Location within France Location within Grand Est
- Coordinates: 48°41′18″N 6°57′09″E
- Country: France
- Region: Grand Est
- Department: Moselle
- Arrondissement: Sarrebourg-Château-Salins
- Canton: Sarrebourg
- Intercommunality: Sarrebourg - Moselle Sud

Government
  - Mayor (2020–2026): Laurent Moallic
- Area^{1}: 1.54 km^{2} (0.59 sq mi)
- Elevation: 270 m (890 ft)
- Highest elevation: 310 m (1,020 ft)
- Lowest elevation: 265 m (869 ft)
- Population (2023): 173
  - Density: 112/km^{2} (291/sq mi)
- Time zone: UTC+01:00 (CET)
  - Summer (DST): UTC+02:00 (CEST)
- INSEE/Postal code: 57320 /57830
- ^{1} French Land Register data, which excludes lakes, ponds, glaciers > 1 km^{2} (0.386 sq mi or 247 acres) and river estuaries.

Hertzing (German: Herzing) is a commune in the Moselle department in Grand Est in north-eastern France.

== See also ==
- Communes of the Moselle department
