= Veckersviller =

- Commune
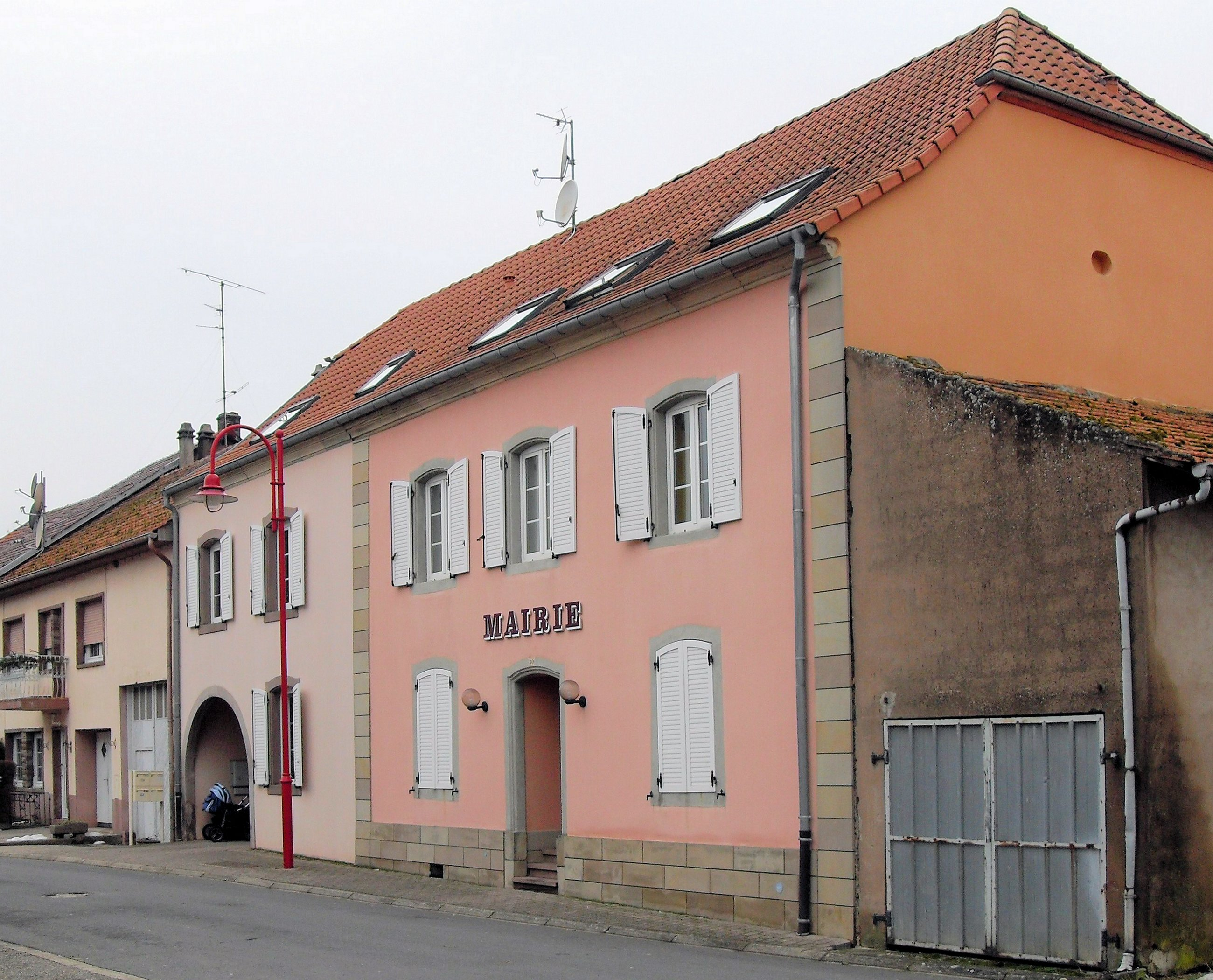
- The town hall in Veckersviller

- Coat of arms
- Location of Veckersviller
- Location within France Location within Grand Est
- Coordinates: 48°50′30″N 7°10′50″E
- Country: France
- Region: Grand Est
- Department: Moselle
- Arrondissement: Sarrebourg-Château-Salins
- Canton: Sarrebourg
- Intercommunality: Sarrebourg - Moselle Sud

Government
  - Mayor (2020–2026): Francis Baumann
- Area^{1}: 4.79 km^{2} (1.85 sq mi)
- Elevation: 320 m (1,050 ft)
- Highest elevation: 325 m (1,066 ft)
- Lowest elevation: 268 m (879 ft)
- Population (2023): 230
  - Density: 48/km^{2} (120/sq mi)
- Time zone: UTC+01:00 (CET)
  - Summer (DST): UTC+02:00 (CEST)
- INSEE/Postal code: 57703 /57370
- ^{1} French Land Register data, which excludes lakes, ponds, glaciers > 1 km^{2} (0.386 sq mi or 247 acres) and river estuaries.

Veckersviller (in German Weckersweiler) is a commune in the Moselle department in Grand Est in north-eastern France.

== See also ==
- Communes of the Moselle department
