= Fleisheim =

- Commune
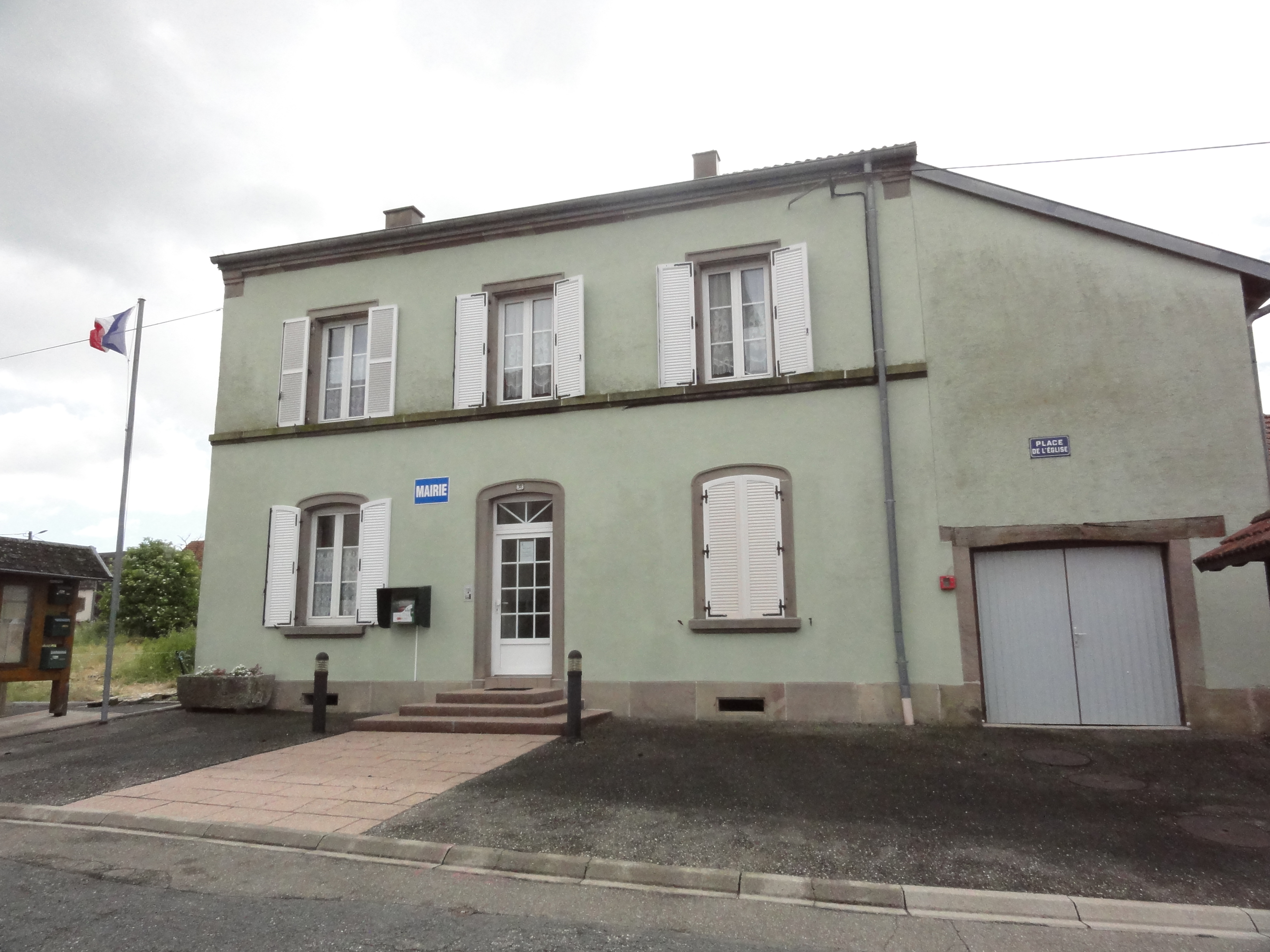
- The town hall in Fleisheim

- Coat of arms
- Location of Fleisheim
- Location within France Location within Grand Est
- Coordinates: 48°47′22″N 7°09′46″E
- Country: France
- Region: Grand Est
- Department: Moselle
- Arrondissement: Sarrebourg-Château-Salins
- Canton: Sarrebourg
- Intercommunality: Sarrebourg - Moselle Sud

Government
  - Mayor (2020–2026): Dominique Marchal
- Area^{1}: 4.11 km^{2} (1.59 sq mi)
- Elevation: 540 m (1,770 ft)
- Highest elevation: 334 m (1,096 ft)
- Lowest elevation: 278 m (912 ft)
- Population (2023): 135
  - Density: 32.8/km^{2} (85.1/sq mi)
- Time zone: UTC+01:00 (CET)
  - Summer (DST): UTC+02:00 (CEST)
- INSEE/Postal code: 57216 /57635
- ^{1} French Land Register data, which excludes lakes, ponds, glaciers > 1 km^{2} (0.386 sq mi or 247 acres) and river estuaries.

Fleisheim (French pronunciation: [flaisaim]; German: Fleisheim) is a commune in the Moselle department in Grand Est in north-eastern France.

== See also ==
- Communes of the Moselle department
