= Assenoncourt =

- Commune
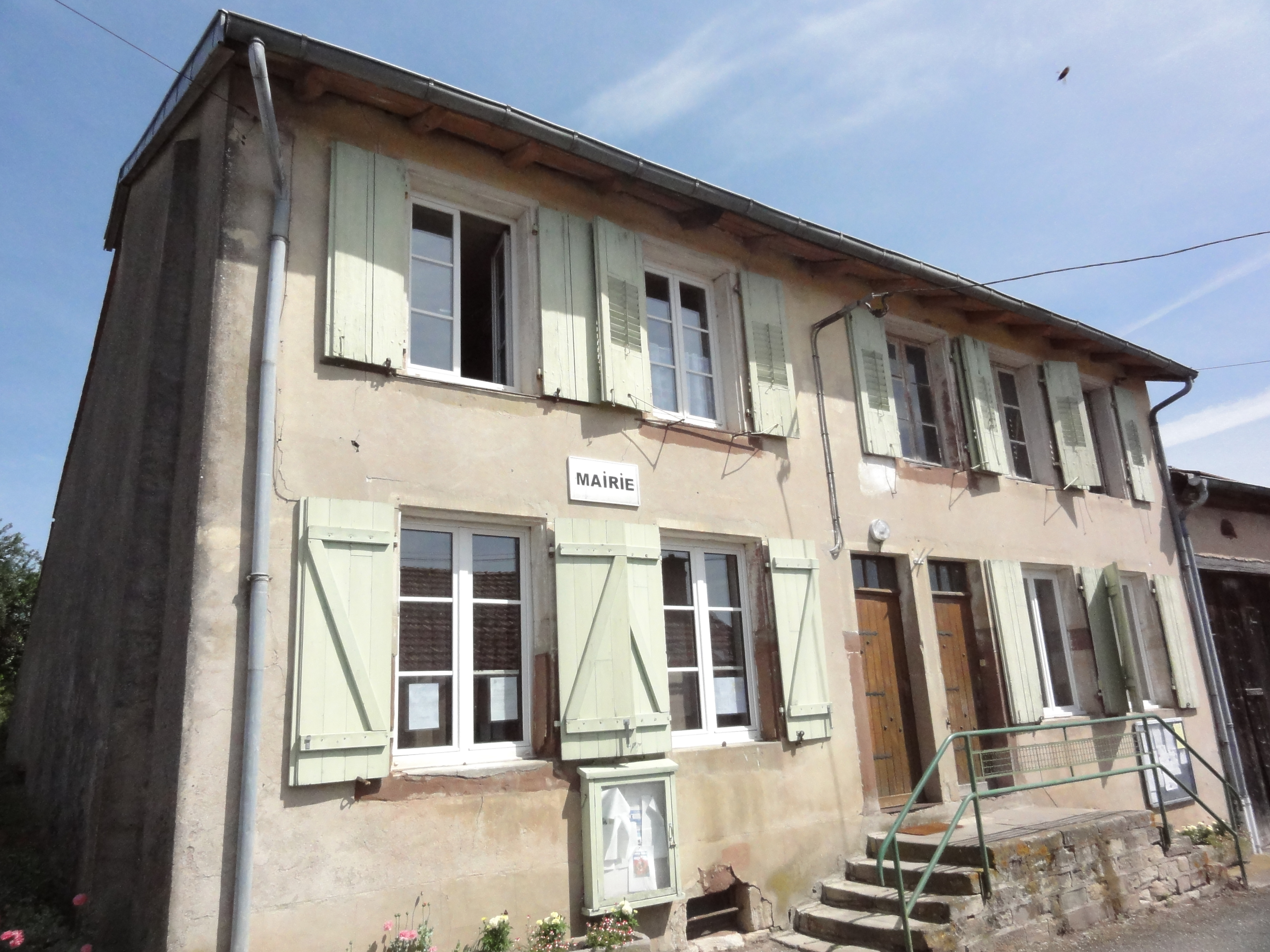
- The town hall in Assenoncourt

- Coat of arms
- Location of Assenoncourt
- Location within France Location within Grand Est
- Coordinates: 48°46′19″N 6°47′48″E
- Country: France
- Region: Grand Est
- Department: Moselle
- Arrondissement: Sarrebourg-Château-Salins
- Canton: Sarrebourg
- Intercommunality: CC Sarrebourg - Moselle Sud

Government
  - Mayor (2020–2026): Martine Peltre
- Area^{1}: 16.69 km^{2} (6.44 sq mi)
- Highest elevation: 253 m (830 ft)
- Lowest elevation: 210 m (690 ft)
- Population (2023): 115
  - Density: 6.89/km^{2} (17.8/sq mi)
- Time zone: UTC+01:00 (CET)
  - Summer (DST): UTC+02:00 (CEST)
- INSEE/Postal code: 57035 /57260
- ^{1} French Land Register data, which excludes lakes, ponds, glaciers > 1 km^{2} (0.386 sq mi or 247 acres) and river estuaries.

Assenoncourt (French pronunciation: [asnɔ̃kuʁ]; German: Essesdorf, (1941–44): Hesselsdorf) is a commune in the Moselle department in Grand Est in northeastern France.

== Population ==
Historical population
Year	Pop.	±% p.a.
1968	178	—
1975	171	−0.57%
1982	161	−0.86%
1990	141	−1.64%
1999	119	−1.87%
2007	137	+1.78%
2012	124	−1.97%
2017	116	−1.32%
2023	115	−0.14%
Source: INSEE

== See also ==
- Communes of the Moselle department
- Parc naturel régional de Lorraine
