= Saint-Jean-de-Bassel =

- Commune
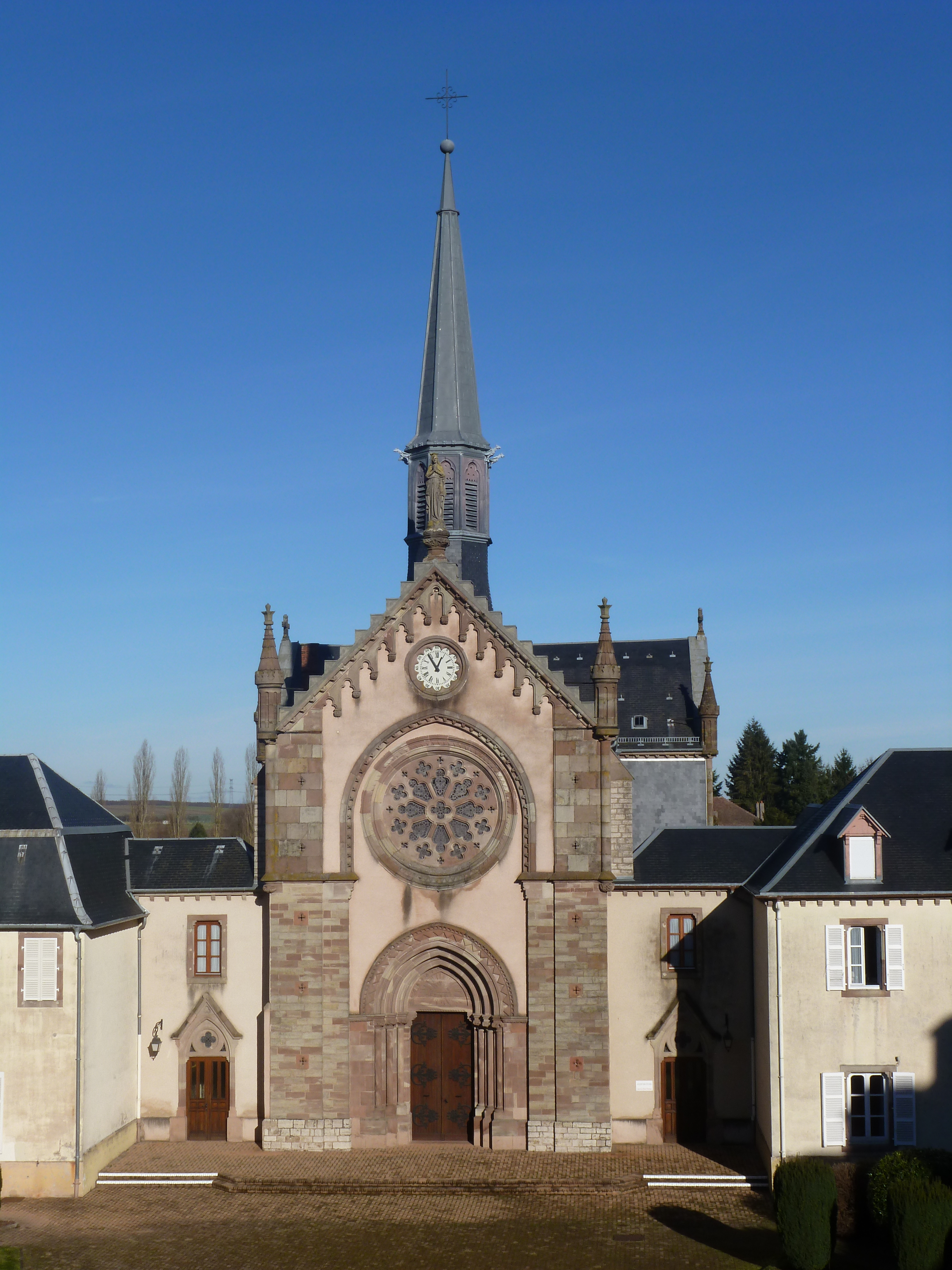
- The convent in Saint-Jean-de-Bassel

- Coat of arms
- Location of Saint-Jean-de-Bassel
- Location within France Location within Grand Est
- Coordinates: 48°48′16″N 6°59′29″E
- Country: France
- Region: Grand Est
- Department: Moselle
- Arrondissement: Sarrebourg-Château-Salins
- Canton: Sarrebourg

Government
  - Mayor (2020–2026): Karine Herzog
- Area^{1}: 10.05 km^{2} (3.88 sq mi)
- Elevation: 265 m (869 ft)
- Highest elevation: 275 m (902 ft)
- Lowest elevation: 232 m (761 ft)
- Population (2023): 322
  - Density: 32.0/km^{2} (83.0/sq mi)
- Time zone: UTC+01:00 (CET)
  - Summer (DST): UTC+02:00 (CEST)
- INSEE/Postal code: 57613 /57930
- ^{1} French Land Register data, which excludes lakes, ponds, glaciers > 1 km^{2} (0.386 sq mi or 247 acres) and river estuaries.

Saint-Jean-de-Bassel (French pronunciation: [sɛ̃ ʒɑ̃ də basɛl]; German: Sankt Johann von Bassel) is a commune in the Moselle department in Grand Est in north-eastern France.

== See also ==
- Communes of the Moselle department
