= Berthelming =

- Commune
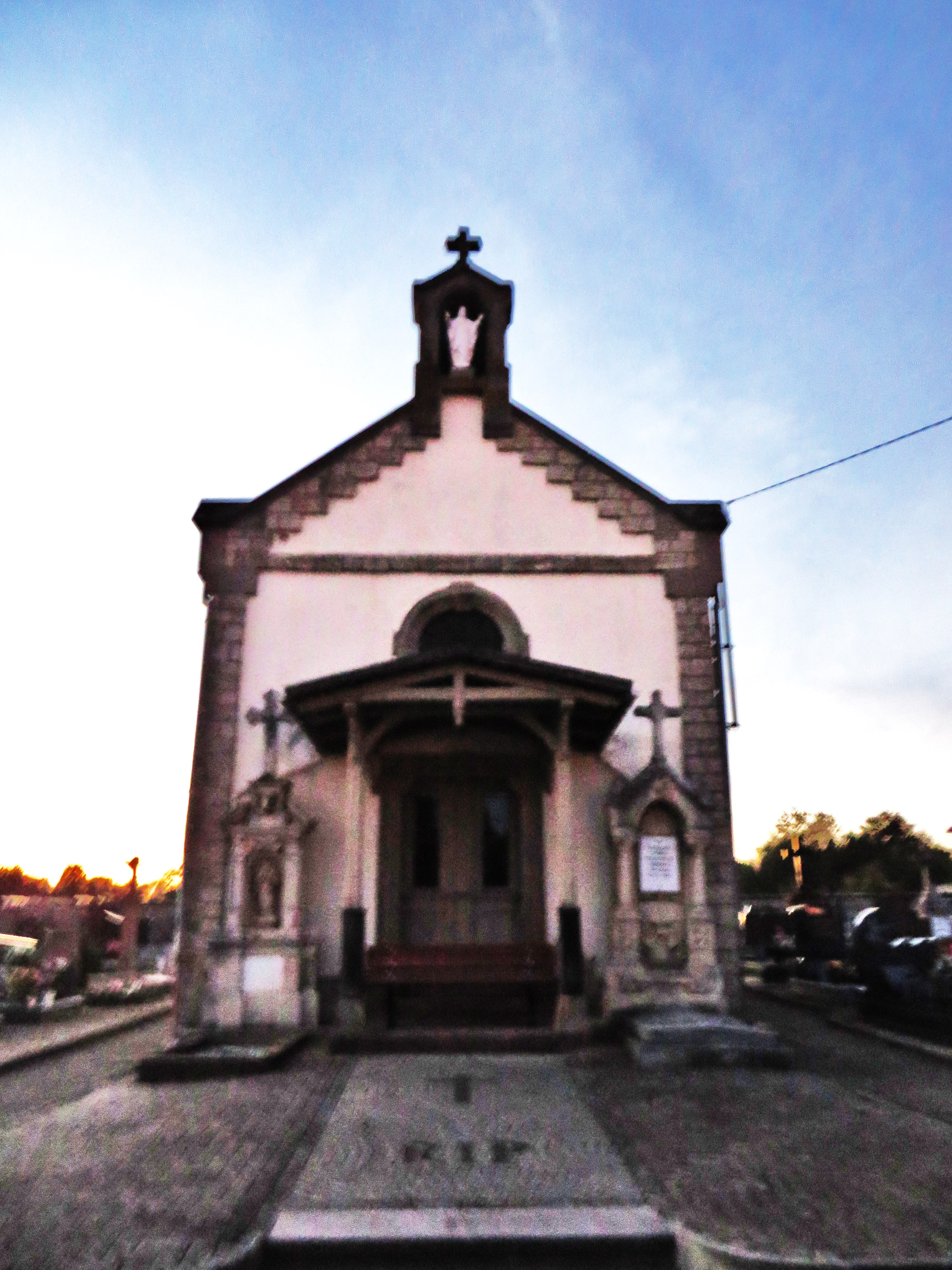
- The cemetery chapel in Berthelming

- Coat of arms
- Location of Berthelming
- Location within France Location within Grand Est
- Coordinates: 48°49′01″N 7°00′23″E
- Country: France
- Region: Grand Est
- Department: Moselle
- Arrondissement: Sarrebourg-Château-Salins
- Canton: Sarrebourg

Government
  - Mayor (2020–2026): Claude Erhard
- Area^{1}: 10.67 km^{2} (4.12 sq mi)
- Elevation: 250 m (820 ft)
- Highest elevation: 282 m (925 ft)
- Lowest elevation: 231 m (758 ft)
- Population (2023): 509
  - Density: 47.7/km^{2} (124/sq mi)
- Time zone: UTC+01:00 (CET)
  - Summer (DST): UTC+02:00 (CEST)
- INSEE/Postal code: 57066 /57930
- ^{1} French Land Register data, which excludes lakes, ponds, glaciers > 1 km^{2} (0.386 sq mi or 247 acres) and river estuaries.

Berthelming (French pronunciation: [bɛʁtəlmɛ̃]; German: Berthelmingen) is a commune in the Moselle department in Grand Est in northeastern France. It has a railway station on the line from Metz to Strasbourg.

== History ==
The village was part of the seigneury of Fénétrange-Schwanhals. The commune was destroyed during the Thirty Years' War.

== Population ==
Historical population
Year	Pop.	±% p.a.
1968	587	—
1975	556	−0.77%
1982	568	+0.31%
1990	501	−1.56%
1999	520	+0.41%
2007	519	−0.02%
2012	507	−0.47%
2017	511	+0.16%
2023	509	−0.07%
Source: INSEE

== Cultural heritage and architecture ==
The village houses the remains of a Gallo-Roman villa.

A fortified house from the medieval period is still visible nowadays.

== See also ==
- Communes of the Moselle department
