= Fribourg, Moselle =

Fribourg
- Commune
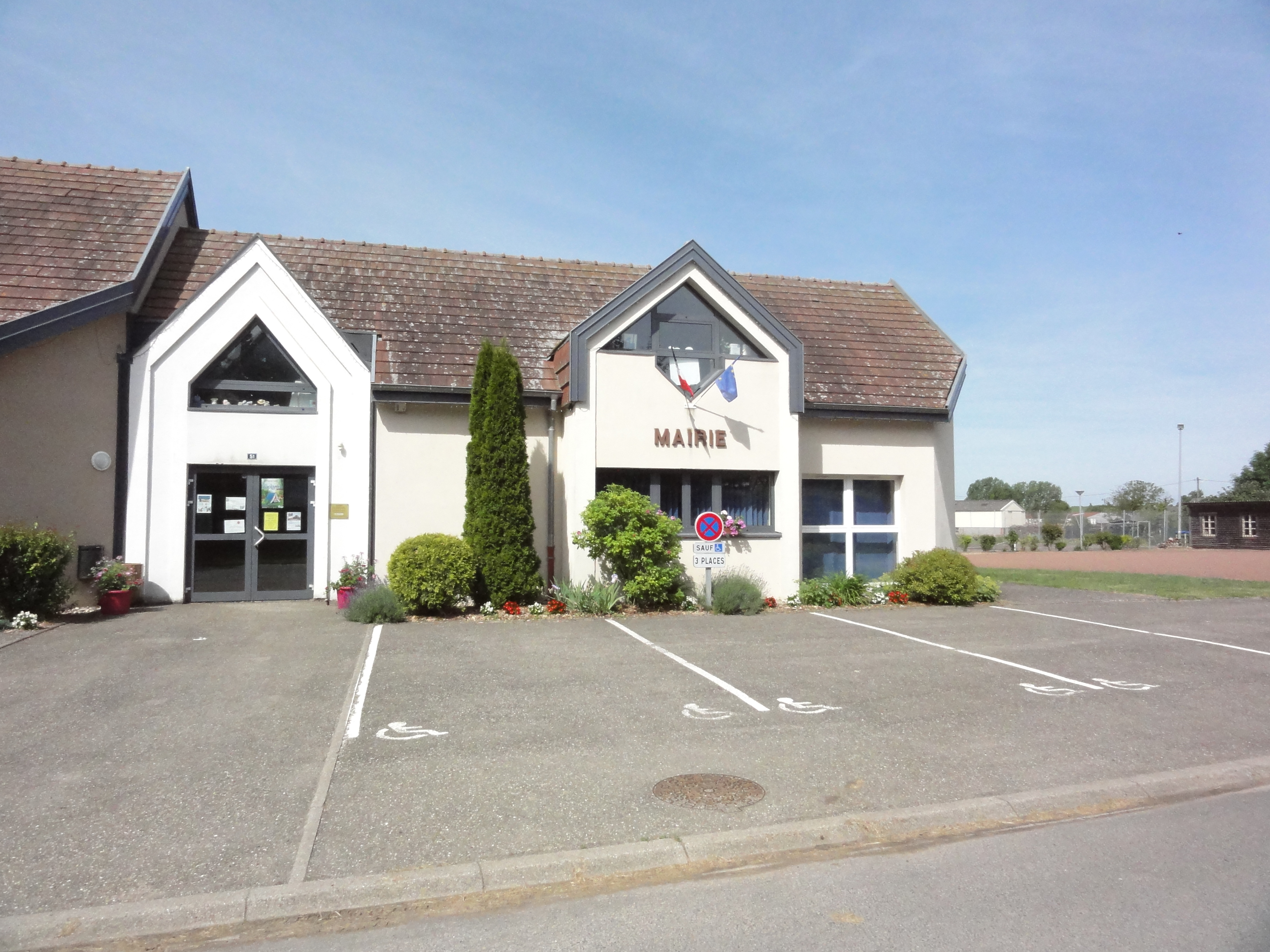
- The town hall in Fribourg

- Coat of arms
- Location of Fribourg
- Location within France Location within Grand Est
- Coordinates: 48°46′02″N 6°51′26″E
- Country: France
- Region: Grand Est
- Department: Moselle
- Arrondissement: Sarrebourg-Château-Salins
- Canton: Sarrebourg
- Intercommunality: Sarrebourg - Moselle Sud

Government
  - Mayor (2020–2026): Robert Rudeau
- Area^{1}: 17.42 km^{2} (6.73 sq mi)
- Elevation: 260 m (850 ft)
- Highest elevation: 301 m (988 ft)
- Lowest elevation: 223 m (732 ft)
- Population (2023): 159
  - Density: 9.13/km^{2} (23.6/sq mi)
- Time zone: UTC+01:00 (CET)
  - Summer (DST): UTC+02:00 (CEST)
- INSEE/Postal code: 57241 /57810
- ^{1} French Land Register data, which excludes lakes, ponds, glaciers > 1 km^{2} (0.386 sq mi or 247 acres) and river estuaries.

Fribourg (French pronunciation: [fʁibuʁ]; German: Freiburg) is a commune in the Moselle department in Grand Est in north-eastern France.

== See also ==
- Communes of the Moselle department
- Parc naturel régional de Lorraine
