= Kerprich-aux-Bois =

- Commune
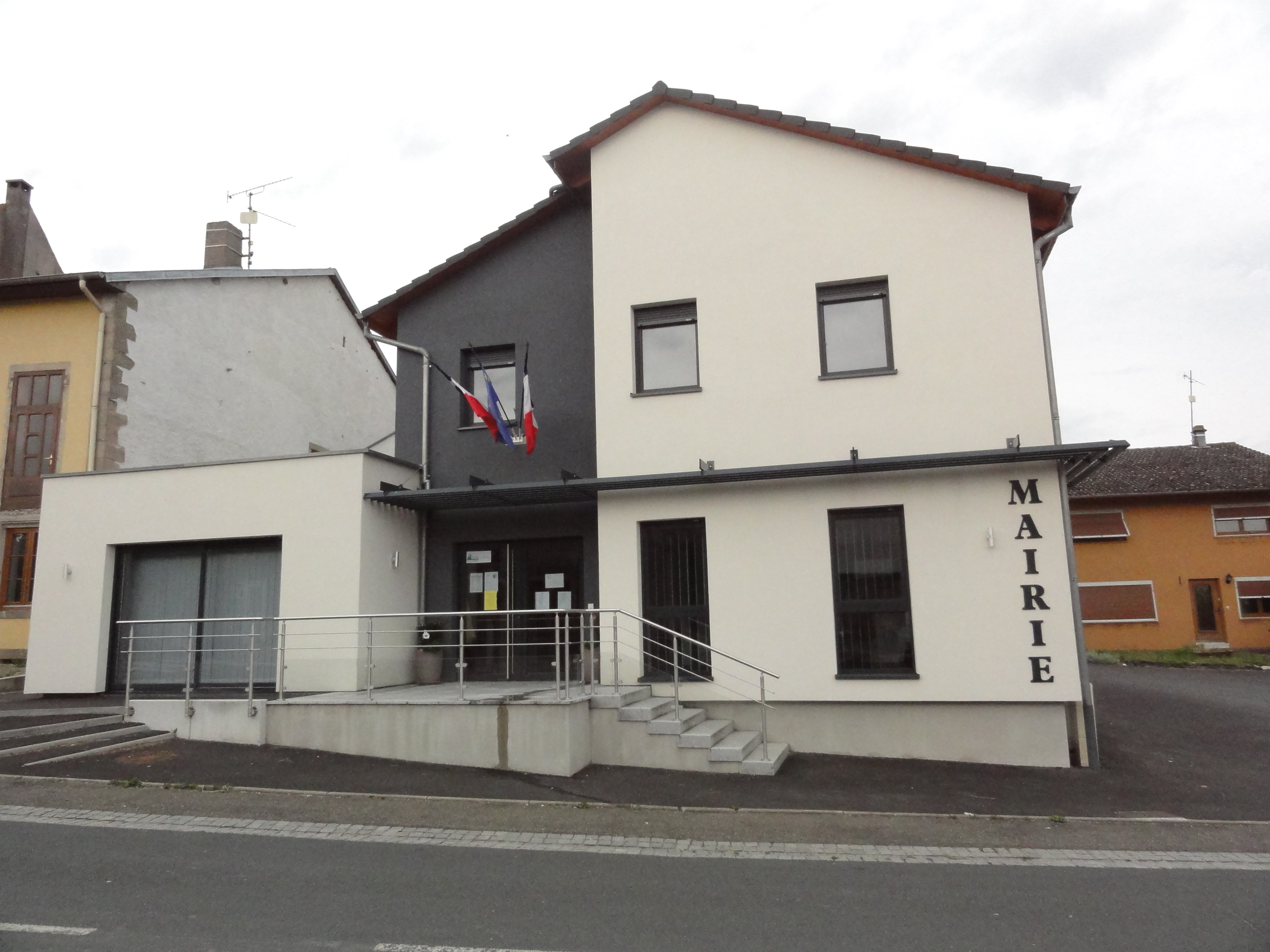
- The town hall in Kerprich-aux-Bois

- Coat of arms
- Location of Kerprich-aux-Bois
- Location within France Location within Grand Est
- Coordinates: 48°44′23″N 6°57′39″E
- Country: France
- Region: Grand Est
- Department: Moselle
- Arrondissement: Sarrebourg-Château-Salins
- Canton: Sarrebourg
- Intercommunality: Sarrebourg - Moselle Sud

Government
  - Mayor (2020–2026): Gérard Fixaris
- Area^{1}: 6.45 km^{2} (2.49 sq mi)
- Elevation: 280 m (920 ft)
- Highest elevation: 314 m (1,030 ft)
- Lowest elevation: 257 m (843 ft)
- Population (2023): 197
  - Density: 30.5/km^{2} (79.1/sq mi)
- Time zone: UTC+01:00 (CET)
  - Summer (DST): UTC+02:00 (CEST)
- INSEE/Postal code: 57362 /57830
- ^{1} French Land Register data, which excludes lakes, ponds, glaciers > 1 km^{2} (0.386 sq mi or 247 acres) and river estuaries.

Kerprich-aux-Bois (French pronunciation: [kɛʁpʁiʃ o bwa]; German: Kirchberg am Wald) is a commune in the Moselle department in Grand Est in north-eastern France.

== See also ==
- Communes of the Moselle department
