= Imling =

- Commune
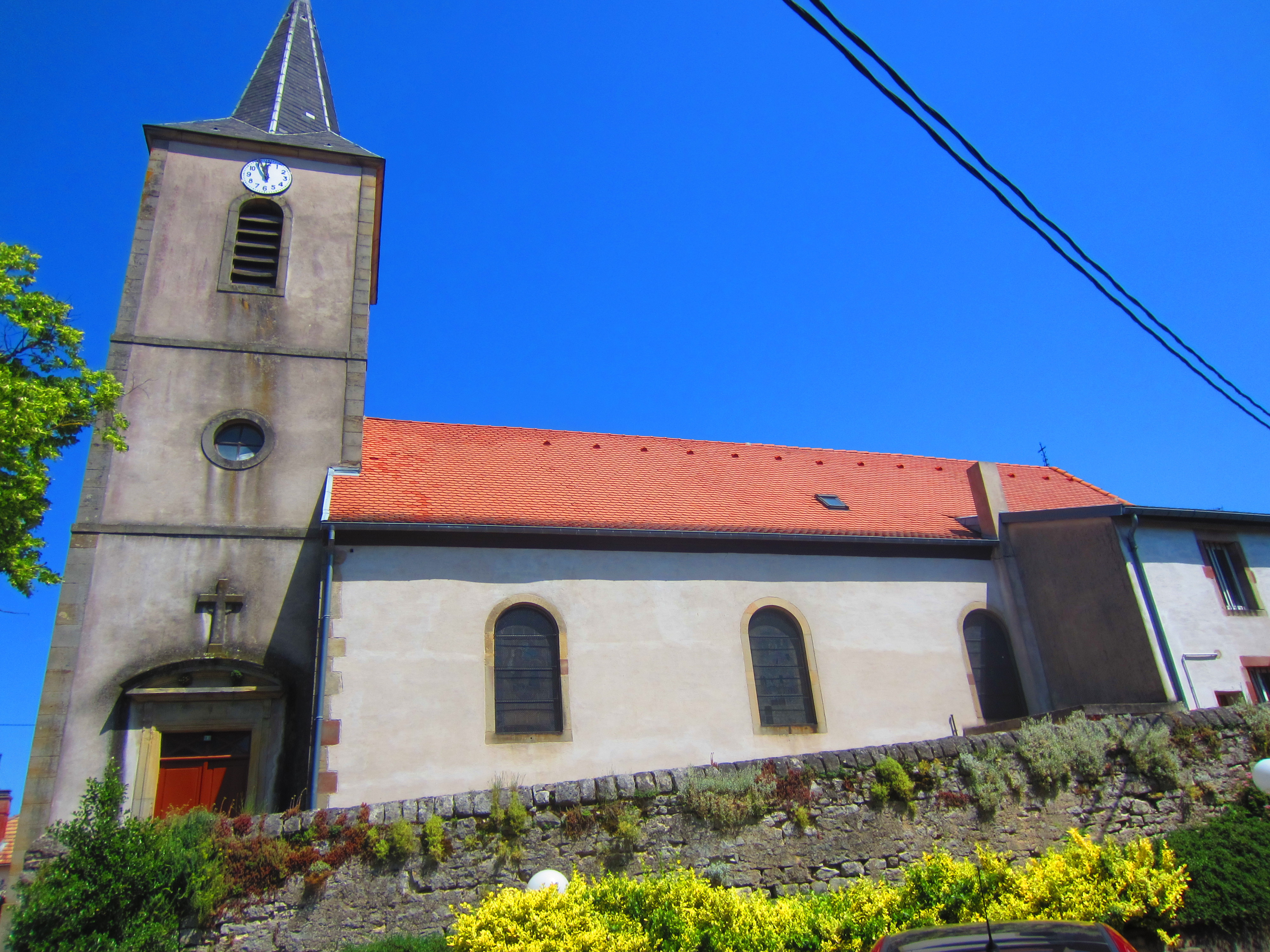
- The church in Imling

- Coat of arms
- Location of Imling
- Location within France Location within Grand Est
- Coordinates: 48°43′13″N 7°01′28″E
- Country: France
- Region: Grand Est
- Department: Moselle
- Arrondissement: Sarrebourg-Château-Salins
- Canton: Sarrebourg
- Intercommunality: CC Sarrebourg Moselle Sud

Government
  - Mayor (2020–2026): Franck Becker
- Area^{1}: 6.11 km^{2} (2.36 sq mi)
- Elevation: 200 m (660 ft)
- Highest elevation: 313 m (1,027 ft)
- Lowest elevation: 245 m (804 ft)
- Population (2023): 685
  - Density: 112/km^{2} (290/sq mi)
- Time zone: UTC+01:00 (CET)
  - Summer (DST): UTC+02:00 (CEST)
- INSEE/Postal code: 57344 /57400
- ^{1} French Land Register data, which excludes lakes, ponds, glaciers > 1 km^{2} (0.386 sq mi or 247 acres) and river estuaries.

Imling (French pronunciation: [imlɛ̃]; German: Imlingen) is a commune in the Moselle department in Grand Est in north-eastern France. Imling is of Old Frankish Origin, with the town possibly having been founded, if not renamed. Historically the town was home to a Mennonite community, historically predominantly German in culture, but has changed to show predominantly French culture and most people speak French, both standard and dialectal.

== See also ==
- Communes of the Moselle department
