= Foulcrey =

- Commune
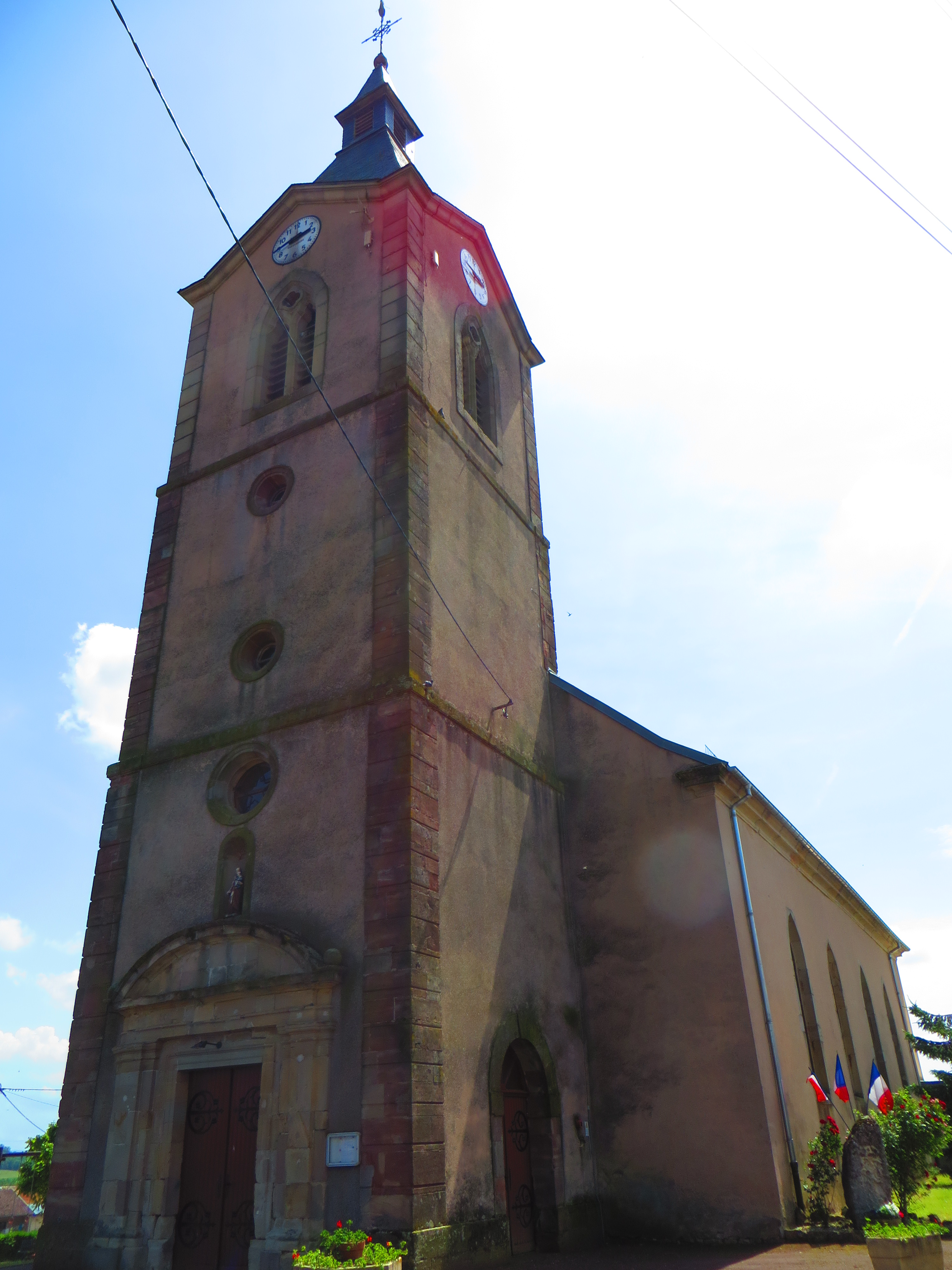
- The church in Foulcrey

- Coat of arms
- Location of Foulcrey
- Location within France Location within Grand Est
- Coordinates: 48°38′19″N 6°51′29″E
- Country: France
- Region: Grand Est
- Department: Moselle
- Arrondissement: Sarrebourg-Château-Salins
- Canton: Sarrebourg
- Intercommunality: Sarrebourg - Moselle Sud

Government
  - Mayor (2020–2026): Michel Henry
- Area^{1}: 12.34 km^{2} (4.76 sq mi)
- Elevation: 283 m (928 ft)
- Highest elevation: 355 m (1,165 ft)
- Lowest elevation: 283 m (928 ft)
- Population (2023): 162
  - Density: 13.1/km^{2} (34.0/sq mi)
- Time zone: UTC+01:00 (CET)
  - Summer (DST): UTC+02:00 (CEST)
- INSEE/Postal code: 57229 /57830
- ^{1} French Land Register data, which excludes lakes, ponds, glaciers > 1 km^{2} (0.386 sq mi or 247 acres) and river estuaries.

Foulcrey (French pronunciation: [fulkʁɛ]; German: Folkringen) is a commune in the Moselle department in Grand Est in north-eastern France.

== See also ==
- Communes of the Moselle department
