= Richeval =

- Commune
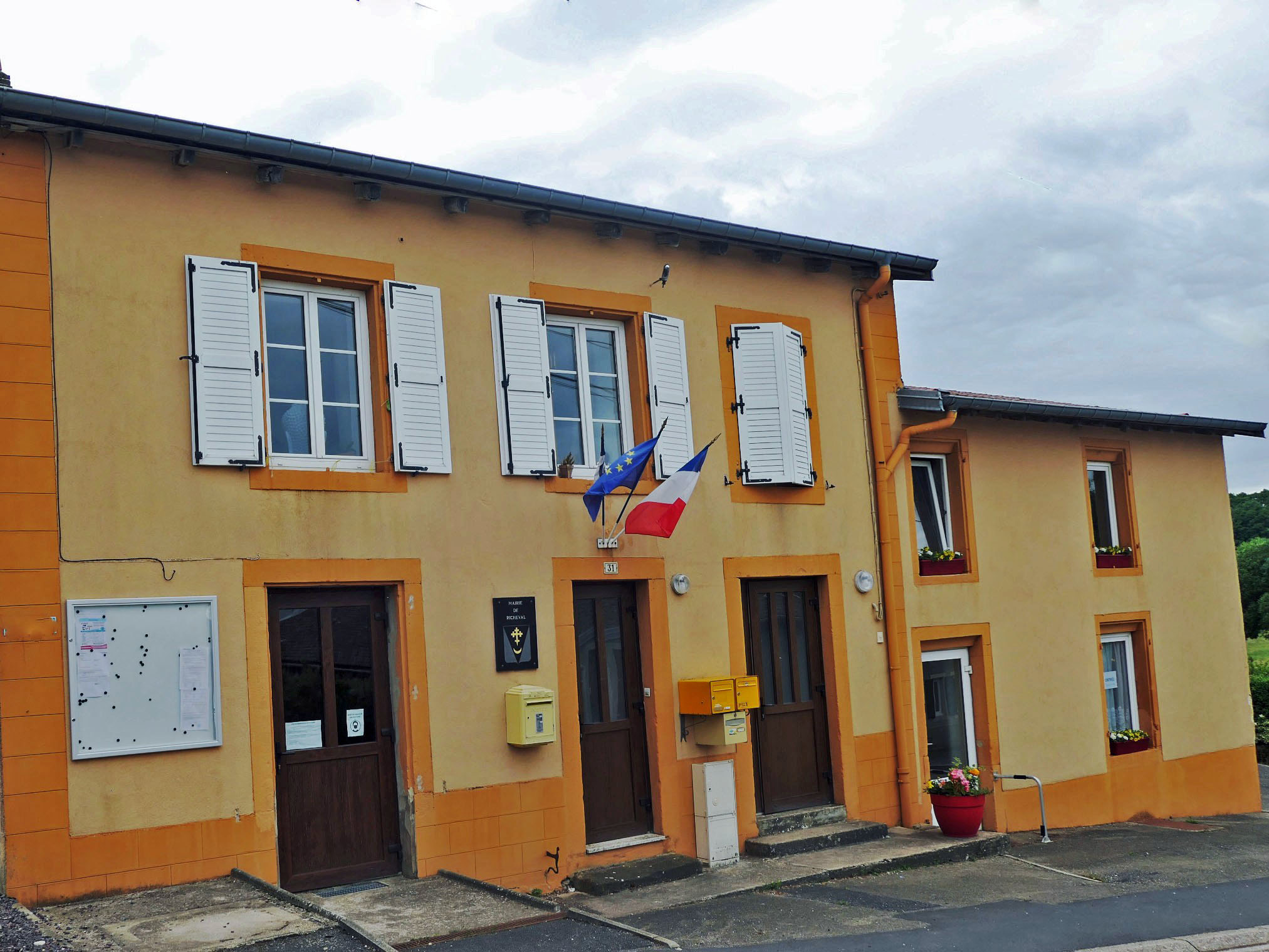

- Coat of arms
- Location of Richeval
- Location within France Location within Grand Est
- Coordinates: 48°38′12″N 6°54′42″E
- Country: France
- Region: Grand Est
- Department: Moselle
- Arrondissement: Sarrebourg-Château-Salins
- Canton: Sarrebourg
- Intercommunality: Sarrebourg - Moselle Sud

Government
  - Mayor (2020–2026): Patrick Herrscher
- Area^{1}: 4.92 km^{2} (1.90 sq mi)
- Elevation: 350 m (1,150 ft)
- Highest elevation: 353 m (1,158 ft)
- Lowest elevation: 286 m (938 ft)
- Population (2023): 111
  - Density: 22.6/km^{2} (58.4/sq mi)
- Time zone: UTC+01:00 (CET)
  - Summer (DST): UTC+02:00 (CEST)
- INSEE/Postal code: 57583 /57830
- ^{1} French Land Register data, which excludes lakes, ponds, glaciers > 1 km^{2} (0.386 sq mi or 247 acres) and river estuaries.

Richeval (French pronunciation: [ʁiʃval]; German: Reichental) is a commune in the Moselle department in Grand Est in north-eastern France. It is situated in the historical region Lorraine, at 62 km from Strasbourg, the nearest city.

== See also ==
- Communes of the Moselle department
