= Diane-Capelle =

- Commune
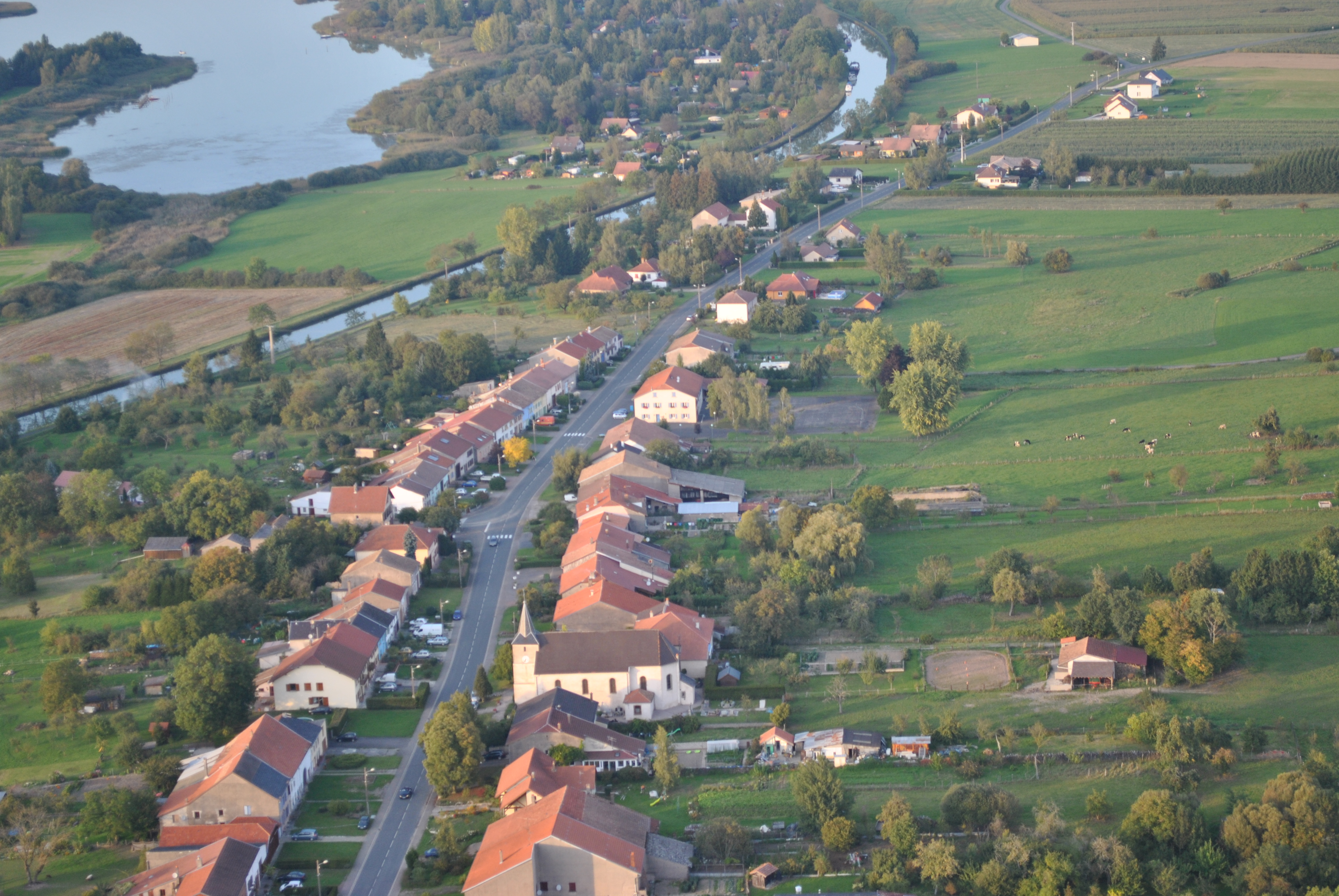
- An aerial view of Diane-Capelle

- Coat of arms
- Location of Diane-Capelle
- Location within France Location within Grand Est
- Coordinates: 48°43′47″N 6°56′05″E
- Country: France
- Region: Grand Est
- Department: Moselle
- Arrondissement: Sarrebourg-Château-Salins
- Canton: Sarrebourg
- Intercommunality: Sarrebourg - Moselle Sud

Government
  - Mayor (2020–2026): Sylvie Schittly
- Area^{1}: 6.07 km^{2} (2.34 sq mi)
- Elevation: 280 m (920 ft)
- Highest elevation: 302 m (991 ft)
- Lowest elevation: 259 m (850 ft)
- Population (2023): 253
  - Density: 41.7/km^{2} (108/sq mi)
- Time zone: UTC+01:00 (CET)
  - Summer (DST): UTC+02:00 (CEST)
- INSEE/Postal code: 57175 /57830
- ^{1} French Land Register data, which excludes lakes, ponds, glaciers > 1 km^{2} (0.386 sq mi or 247 acres) and river estuaries.

Diane-Capelle (French pronunciation: [djan kapɛl]; German: Dianenkappel) is a commune in the Moselle department in Grand Est in north-eastern France.

== See also ==
- Communes of the Moselle department
