= Desseling =

- Commune
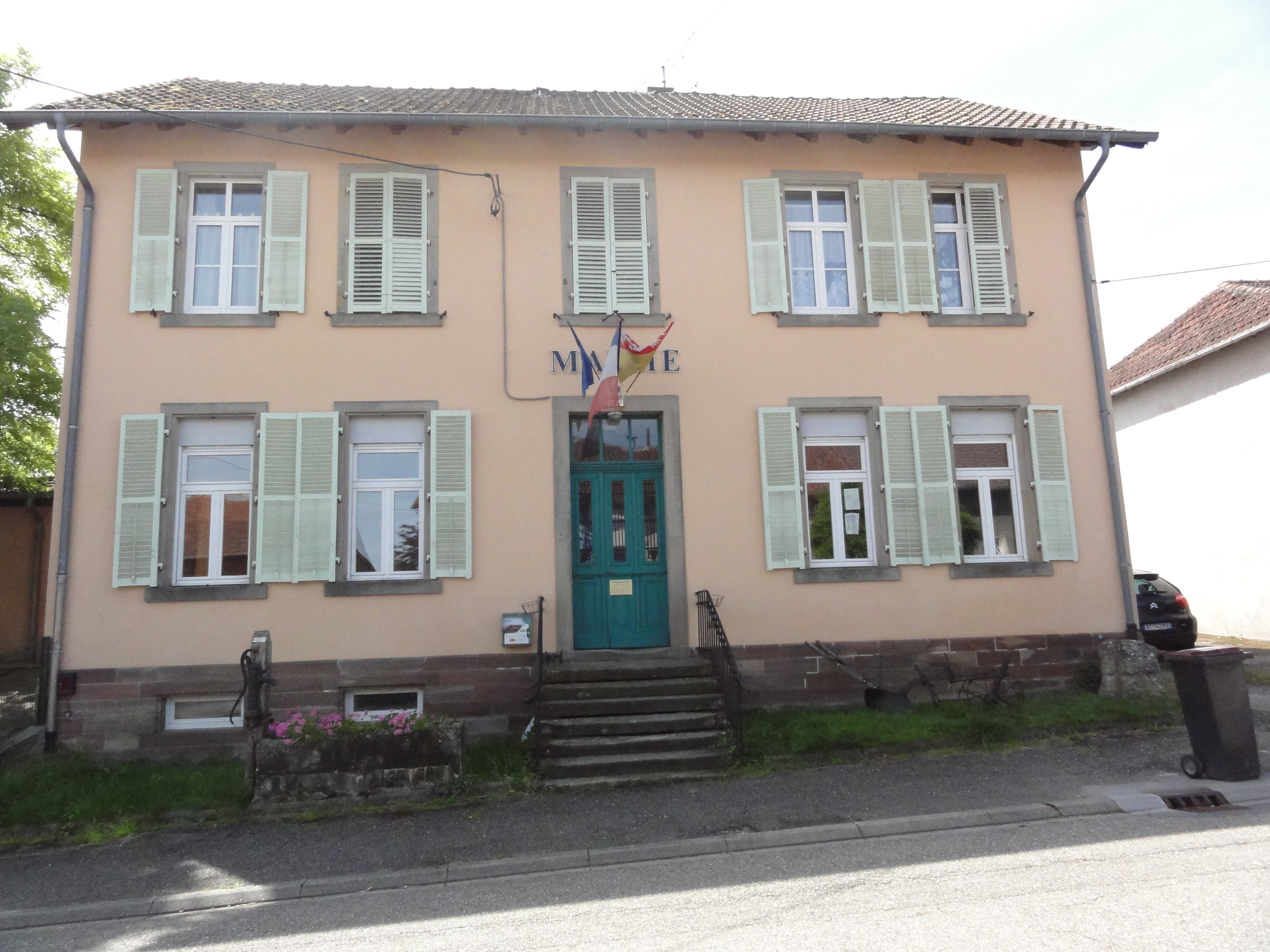
- The town hall in Desseling

- Coat of arms
- Location of Desseling
- Location within France Location within Grand Est
- Coordinates: 48°47′07″N 6°50′41″E
- Country: France
- Region: Grand Est
- Department: Moselle
- Arrondissement: Sarrebourg-Château-Salins
- Canton: Sarrebourg
- Intercommunality: Sarrebourg - Moselle Sud

Government
  - Mayor (2020–2026): Claude Simermann
- Area^{1}: 5.05 km^{2} (1.95 sq mi)
- Elevation: 230 m (750 ft)
- Highest elevation: 272 m (892 ft)
- Lowest elevation: 213 m (699 ft)
- Population (2023): 97
  - Density: 19/km^{2} (50/sq mi)
- Time zone: UTC+01:00 (CET)
  - Summer (DST): UTC+02:00 (CEST)
- INSEE/Postal code: 57173 /57260
- ^{1} French Land Register data, which excludes lakes, ponds, glaciers > 1 km^{2} (0.386 sq mi or 247 acres) and river estuaries.

Desseling (French pronunciation: [dɛslɛ̃]; German: Disselingen) is a commune in the Moselle department in Grand Est in north-eastern France.

== See also ==
- Communes of the Moselle department
- Parc naturel régional de Lorraine
