= Alsace and Moselle railway network =

Railway network in Alsace and Moselle, France

The Alsace and Moselle railway network is a distinctive railway network due to its geographical position—a border region at the heart of Europe—and its history, inseparably tied to the major conflicts of the 19th and 20th centuries and their impact on a territory that alternated between German and French administration. This network spans the European Collectivity of Alsace and the Moselle department, corresponding to the former Reichsland Elsaß-Lothringen.

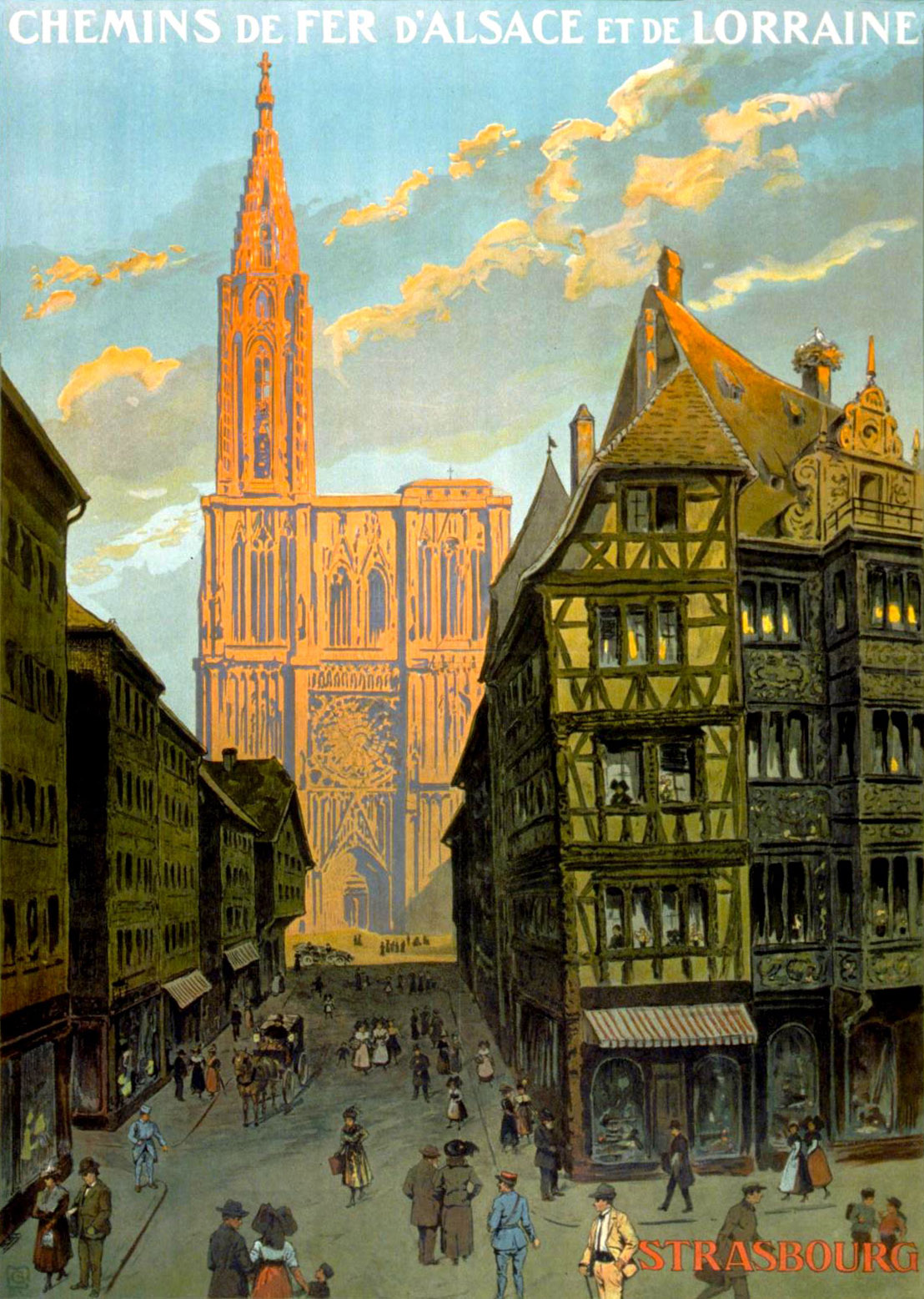
Poster of the Chemins de fer d'Alsace et de Lorraine, featuring Strasbourg Cathedral.

A unique feature of this network is that trains operate on the right, with signals also positioned on the right side.

The network's history began in the late 1830s, with Nicolas Koechlin and his Compagnie du chemin de fer de Mulhouse à Thann. It evolved through several key periods, notably under the Compagnie des chemins de fer de l'Est from 1854 to 1871, the Kaiserliche Generaldirektion der Eisenbahnen in Elsaß-Lothringen (EL) from 1871 to 1918 during the German annexation, the Administration des chemins de fer d'Alsace et de Lorraine (AL) from 1919 to 1938, the Deutsche Reichsbahn from 1940 to 1944 during the second annexation, and finally the Société nationale des chemins de fer français (SNCF).

Most of the network is owned by the French state and primarily managed by SNCF Réseau, consistent with the broader national railway network.

== History ==
=== Network creation ===
Railways in Alsace began on 1 September, 1839, with the opening of the Mulhouse to Thann line. The Strasbourg–Basel railway commenced service on 22 August, 1841. It was extended on 29 May, 1851,. with the Sarrebourg to Strasbourg section of the Paris-Est–Strasbourg-Ville railway. In Lorraine, rail connected Metz to Nancy from 10 July, 1850, and then Saarbrücken in Prussia by 1852. From 1854, the Compagnie des chemins de fer de l'Est operated the network following the merger of several companies, including the Compagnie du chemin de fer de Paris à Strasbourg, the Compagnie du chemin de fer de Strasbourg à Bâle, and the Compagnie du chemin de fer de Mulhouse à Thann. This entity completed the Appenweier–Strasbourg railway, a short hop across the Rhine, in 1861.

=== Development under the German Empire ===
Following France's defeat and the cession of Alsace and part of Lorraine to the newly formed German Empire, the railway network (along with that of the Société royale grand-ducale des chemins de fer Guillaume-Luxembourg) was managed and expanded by the « Kaiserliche Generaldirektion der Eisenbahnen in Elsass-Lothringen » (EL), established on 9 December, 1871. The border station Gare de Nouvel-Avricourt was built in Avricourt on the Paris–Strasbourg line in 1875. New connections were developed toward Germany and Luxembourg, but not France.

In 1877, the opening of the Réding to Metz line established the network's main axis: Luxembourg – Metz – Strasbourg – Basel.

Its length nearly tripled during this period. From 862 kilometres (536 mi) of lines in 1871, it grew to 1,803 kilometres (1,120 mi) of standard-gauge lines and 80 kilometres (50 mi) of narrow-gauge lines by the eve of World War I. German standards mandated (and still mandate) trains running on the right.

In the early 20th century, the Compagnie des transports strasbourgeois (CTS) operated numerous interurban tramway lines. Known as le suburbain, this network peaked at about 100 kilometers of metric-gauge lines in its Alsatian section. Other narrow-gauge lines, run by local companies or the EL, existed in southern Moselle and around Colmar.

This era also saw the rise of significant private industrial railway networks, such as those of the Houillères de Lorraine and the Mines de potasse d'Alsace. Meanwhile, the forestry administration developed forest railways in the Vosges Mountains (Abreschviller, Barr, Schirmeck).

=== French administration ===
The Administration des chemins de fer d'Alsace et de Lorraine (AL) was established on 19 following World War I, after Alsace-Moselle’s reintegration into France. Its purpose was to operate the rail networks reclaimed from the Kaiserliche Generaldirektion der Eisenbahnen in Elsaß-Lothringen. This administration arose due to the Compagnie des chemins de fer de l'Est’s refusal to manage it.

Before nationalization, the AL network included about twenty depots and traction annexes, such as Bénestroff Station, Colmar, Haguenau, Hausbergen Station, Mulhouse-Île-Napoléon, Phalsbourg-Maisons-Rouges, Réding Station, Sarrebourg, Sarreguemines, Saverne, and Strasbourg-Ville. The commune of Bischheim, north of Strasbourg, hosted extensive repair workshops.

=== World War II and SNCF ===
On 1 January, 1938, the AL merged into the newly formed Société nationale des chemins de fer français (SNCF). The AL and Compagnie des chemins de fer de l'Est networks then formed the SNCF's Eastern Region.

On 15 July, 1940, German authorities informed the SNCF that railway facilities in Moselle, Bas-Rhin, and Haut-Rhin now fell under the Deutsche Reichsbahn (DR) regional directorates in Mainz and Karlsruhe. By 15 August 1940, the SNCF was fully ousted from the network. With the territory unofficially annexed to the Reich, pre-1918 border stations from 1871 to 1918 were reactivated.

After World War II, the network returned to SNCF control. The SNCF also managed Luxembourg's railways until the Société nationale des chemins de fer luxembourgeois (CFL) was created in 1946.

In the latter half of the 20th century, many secondary lines closed, mirroring trends across the national network.

The busiest lines were electrified in the 1950s and 1960s.

France's largest classification yard opened between 1963 and 1964 at Woippy, north of Metz.

In the early 1970s, the TGV 001 was tested on the Alsace plain line.

Moselle saw the SNCF's last commercial steam locomotives, with the final one, 141 R 73 from Sarreguemines depot, running on 29 March, 1974.

=== Current situation ===
Today, two Moselle stations—Volmerange-les-Mines and Audun-le-Tiche Station—are managed by Luxembourg railways.

Since 1997, Sarreguemines station has been served by the German tram-train Saarbahn. The Mulhouse Vallée de la Thur tram-train, launched in December 2010, was France's first fully interconnected tram-train.

In 2015, the Bas-Rhin and Haut-Rhin departments had about 120 passenger stations and sixty branch lines handling sixty rail-served terminal facilities, handling 5 million tonnes of goods a year. Strasbourg-Ville station ranks as France's third-busiest provincial station, with 12 million passengers yearly.

Alsace and Moselle retain a rich railway heritage, including Mulhouse's Cité du Train and tourist railways like the Rhine Tourist Railway, Train Thur Doller Alsace, Abreschviller Forest Railway, Canner Valley Tourist Railway, and railbikes on the Dieuze railway and Drulingen railway.

The railway industry thrives here, with the Reichshoffen Railway Factory (formerly De Dietrich Ferroviaire), Vossloh Cogifer in Reichshoffen, Geismar in Colmar, Lohr in Duppigheim, and Lormafer in Creutzwald.

== Network ==
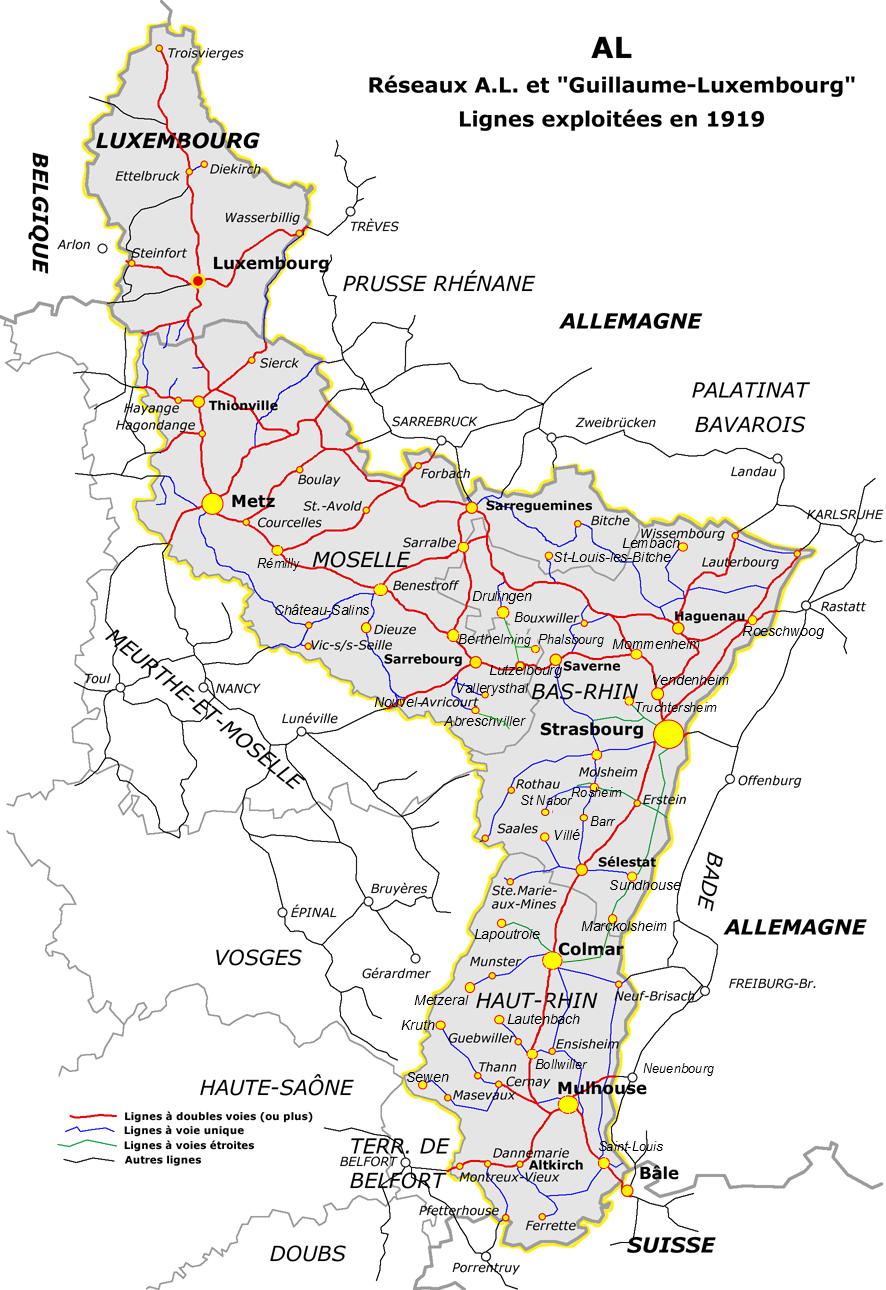
The Alsace-Lorraine and Guillaume-Luxembourg networks in 1919.

The AL network has distinct traits compared to other French railway networks of its time.

It featured (and still features) five major rail hubs: Metz (up to 6 directions, now 3), Sarrebourg – Réding (up to 5, now 4), Strasbourg (5), Colmar (up to 7, now 5), and Mulhouse (5).

=== Characteristics ===
From 1871 to 1946, the EL, then the AL, managed the Royal Grand Ducal Luxembourg Railway Company's network, a role later assumed by the SNCF until the Société nationale des chemins de fer luxembourgeois (CFL) was founded on 14 May, 1946.

Though modest in scope—slightly over 2,320 kilometers in 1937—it has few main lines: Strasbourg – Mulhouse – Basel (line 3), the Strasbourg – Nouvel-Avricourt section of the Paris–Strasbourg line (line 1), and Luxembourg – Metz – Strasbourg (line 3 North). Most of the network comprises small secondary lines, often dead-ends, resulting in low maximum speeds.

This shaped a steam fleet with few high-speed locomotives (type S) and many mixed-use tank locomotives (type T) for passengers and freight.

A vital link in European rail, it connects to German, Luxembourgish, Swiss, and French networks.

=== Train direction and signaling ===
Built on German foundations, the network retains strong traits: unified German-style signaling, a more generous loading gauge, and mostly Prussian-designed equipment.

Trains run on the right on double-track lines in Alsace and Moselle since the 1870 annexation, unlike the left-side norm elsewhere in France. Post-World War I, harmonization was deemed too costly · . The East European high-speed line maintains this, using flyovers for direction switches, like at Baudrecourt, but national uniformity was rejected due to disproportionate costs.

The network had unique railway signaling. Adopted by the EL in 1907 and retained by the AL, it lasted until 1936, when the Verlant code unified national signaling, adapting existing mechanical signals. Later modernization with light signals gradually phased out the old system.

Differences between German and French (British-inspired) signaling stem from train direction on double tracks or sidings. Signals are placed to be readable from the running side.

Given other priorities, authorities retained the status quo, installing specific devices at interconnection points: flyovers between Audun and Fontoy on the Longuyon-Thionville line, at Rombas on the Conflans-Jarny to Hagondange line, between Metz and Ars-sur-Moselle, near Imling between Héming and Sarrebourg, or reversing at Mulhouse toward Belfort (a flyover existed at Illfurth). The LGV Est switches at Vendenheim, with a double-track flyover at Baudrecourt.

=== Stations ===
Few stations remain from the Compagnie du chemin de fer de Strasbourg à Bâle era. These typically had one floor and rounded openings, built in masonry.

Stations from the Compagnie du chemin de fer de Paris à Strasbourg are fairly standard, with a central block, one floor, flanked by one or two wings, constructed in masonry and ashlar.

Imperial General Directorate of Alsace-Lorraine Railways stations were meticulously designed as the "image and showcase" of the German Empire near France. They feature a distinctive style blending neoclassical, neo-Romanesque, and neo-Renaissance influences, with monumental stations.

The Administration des chemins de fer d'Alsace et de Lorraine built few new stations. Notable are the new Sarrebourg station, begun in 1911 by the imperial railways and completed post-reintegration in a "manor" neoclassical style, and the grand Mulhouse-Ville station, opened in 1932.

SNCF-rebuilt stations post-World War II are purely functional. Exceptions include Ribeauvillé and Ostheim – Beblenheim, in a regionalist style.

==== "Standard" station ====
From the 1871 annexation, German policy ensured rail access for communes regardless of size, building or rebuilding many stations, sometimes continuing French-initiated projects like Sarreguemines. About 350 stations and halts were constructed by the imperial railways

Despite variations in scale, location, and era, these "imperial" stations are recognizable, their standardized design reflecting industrial modernity. The side building uses ashlar or Vosges sandstone, often with a large porch and nearly always a rectangular clock-tower dubbed a "keep."

Stations built near the Reichsland’s end, around 1910, are more eclectic. Drulingen and Hausbergen are regionalist, while Erstein, Saint-Louis, and Strasbourg-Cronenbourg are "manor"-style.

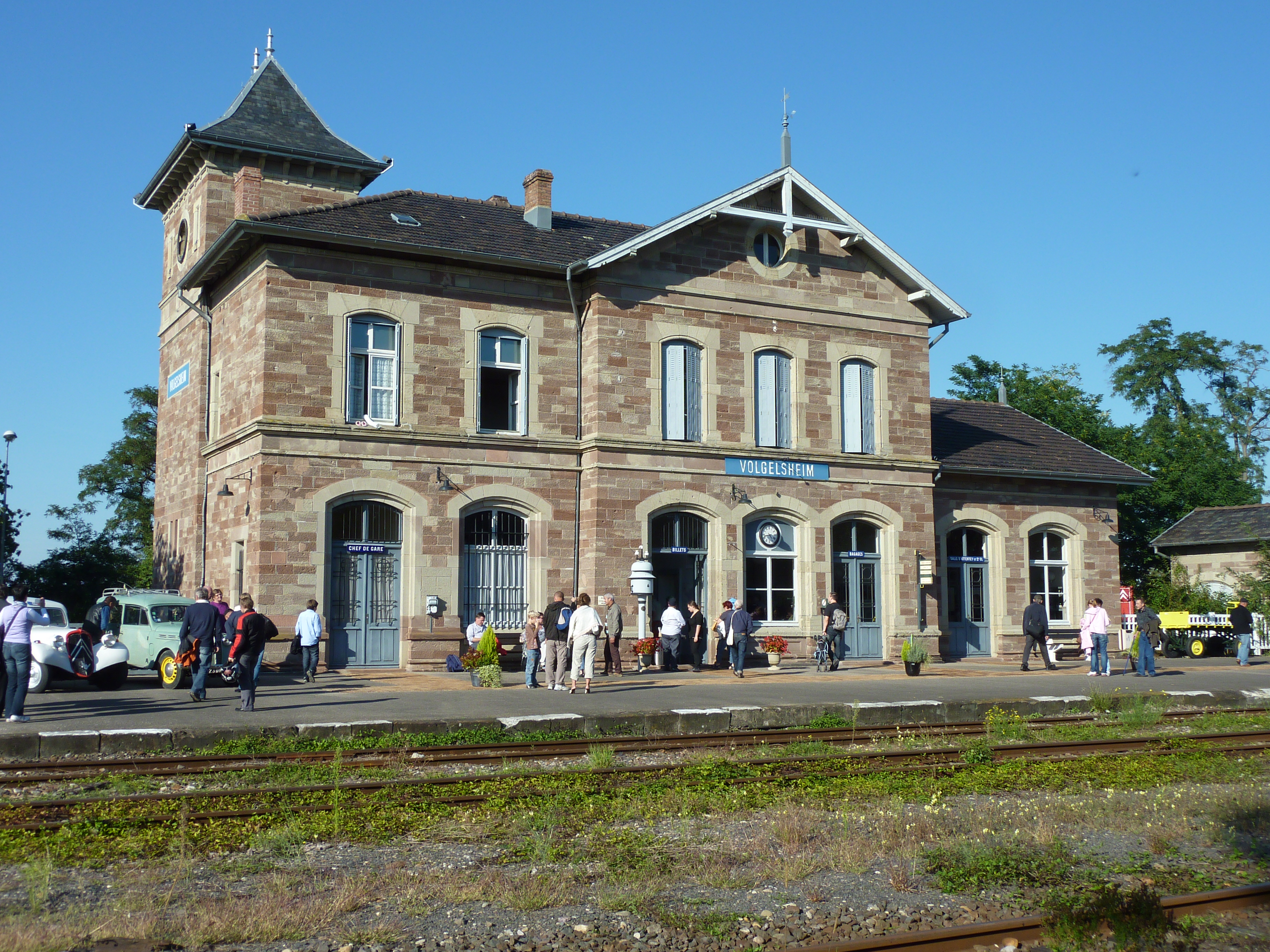
Volgelsheim station, a typical EL tower station.

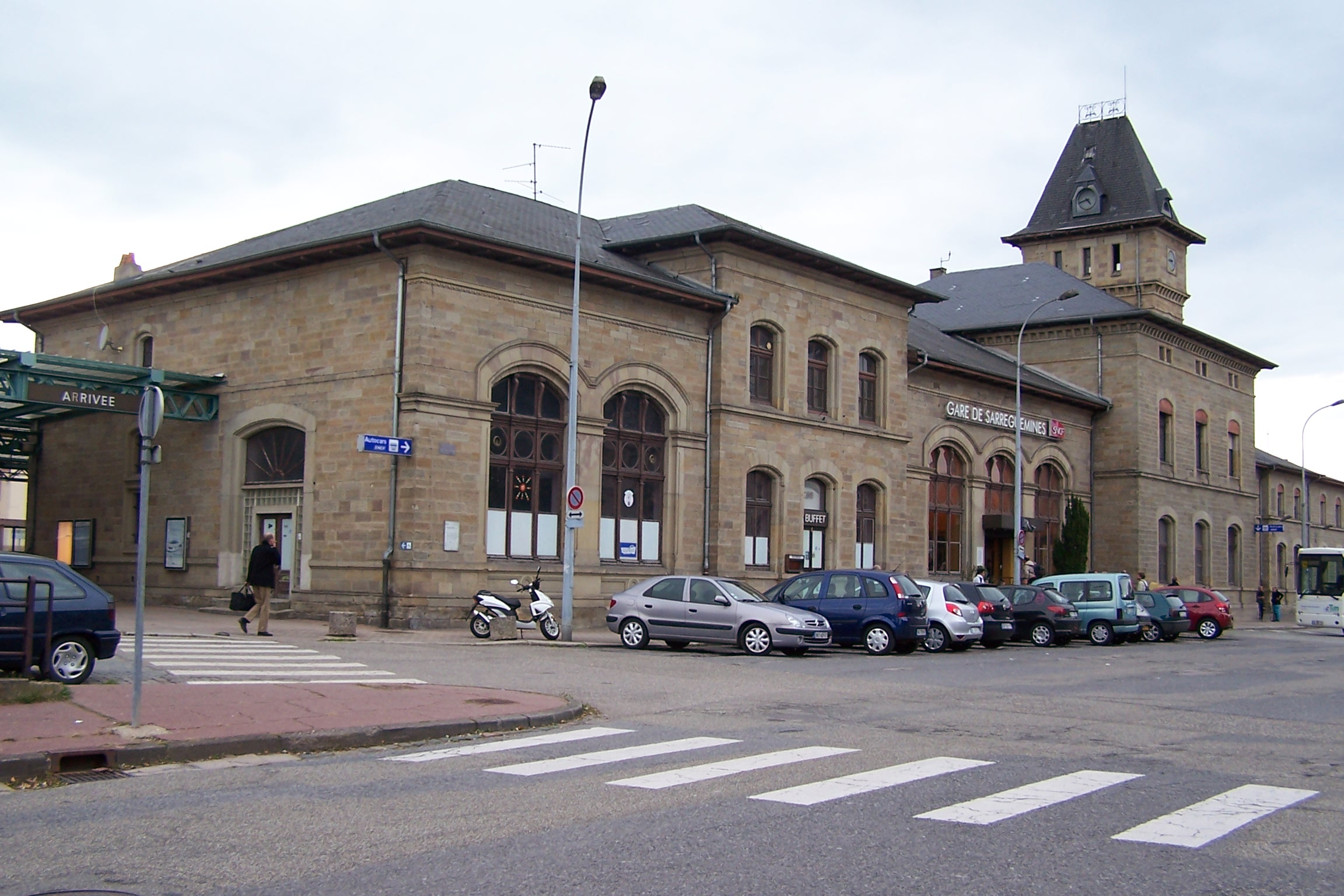
Sarreguemines station passenger building, built 1872–1874.

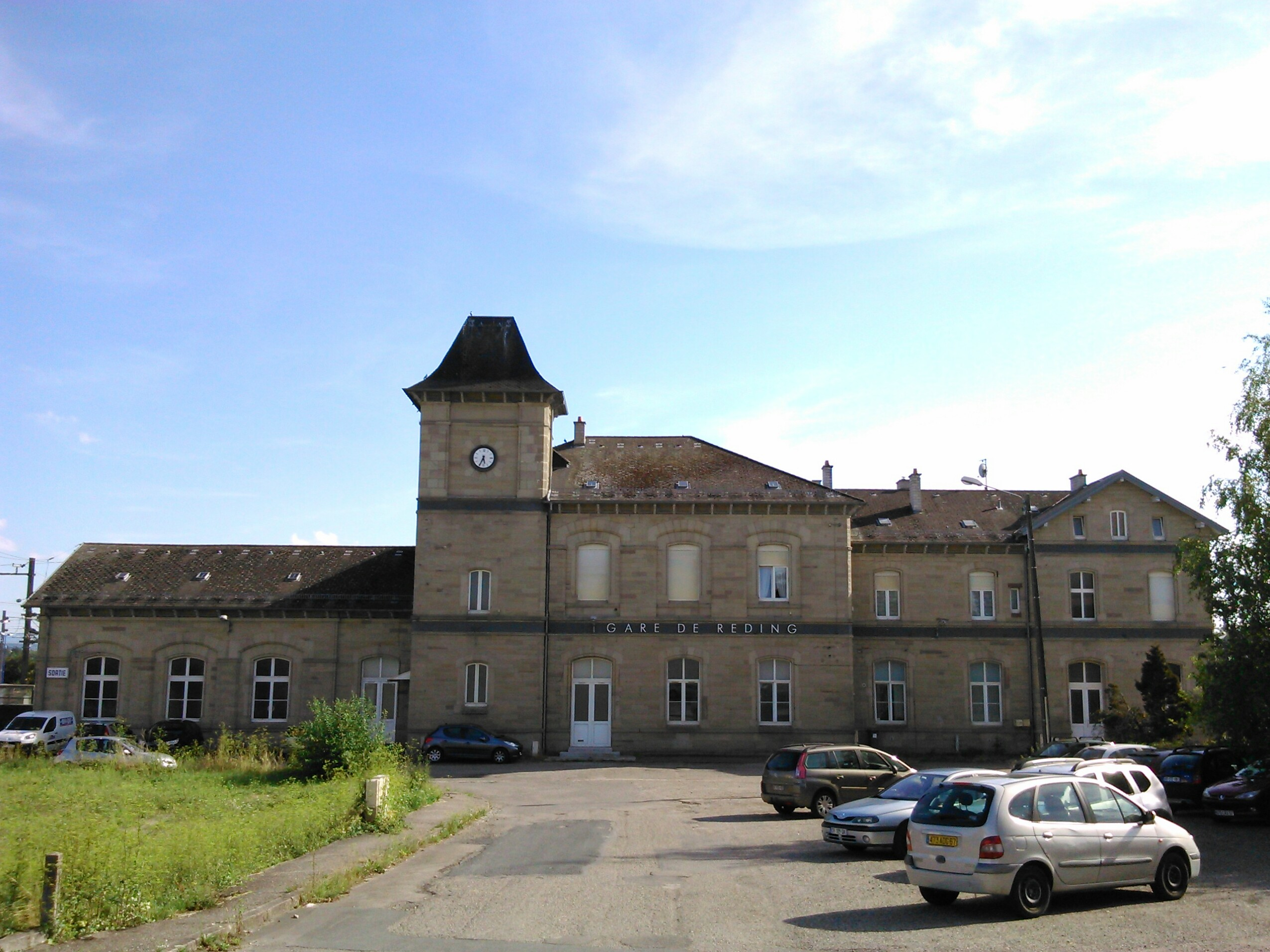
Réding station, built in 1877, a key junction.

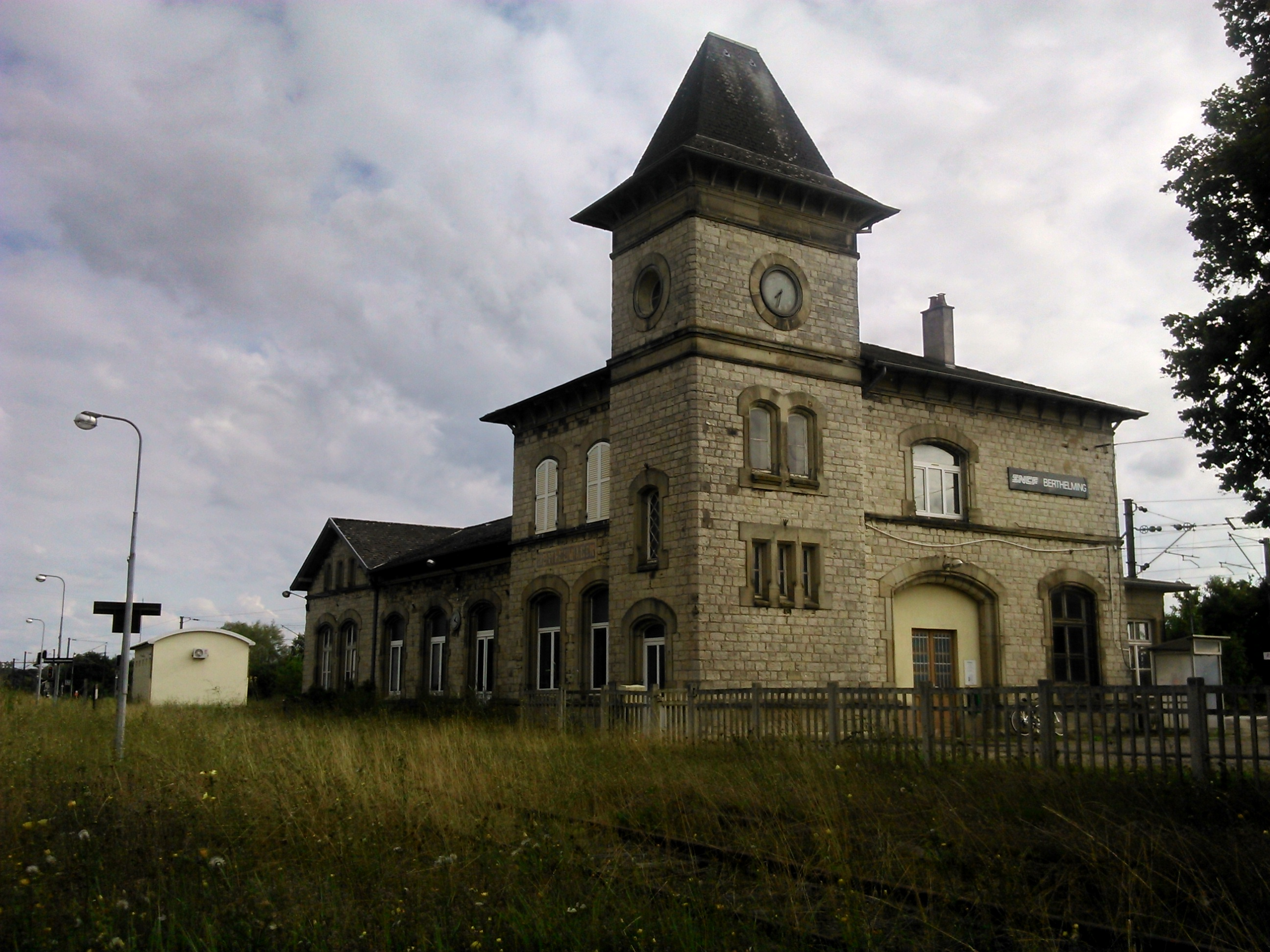
Another junction at Berthelming.

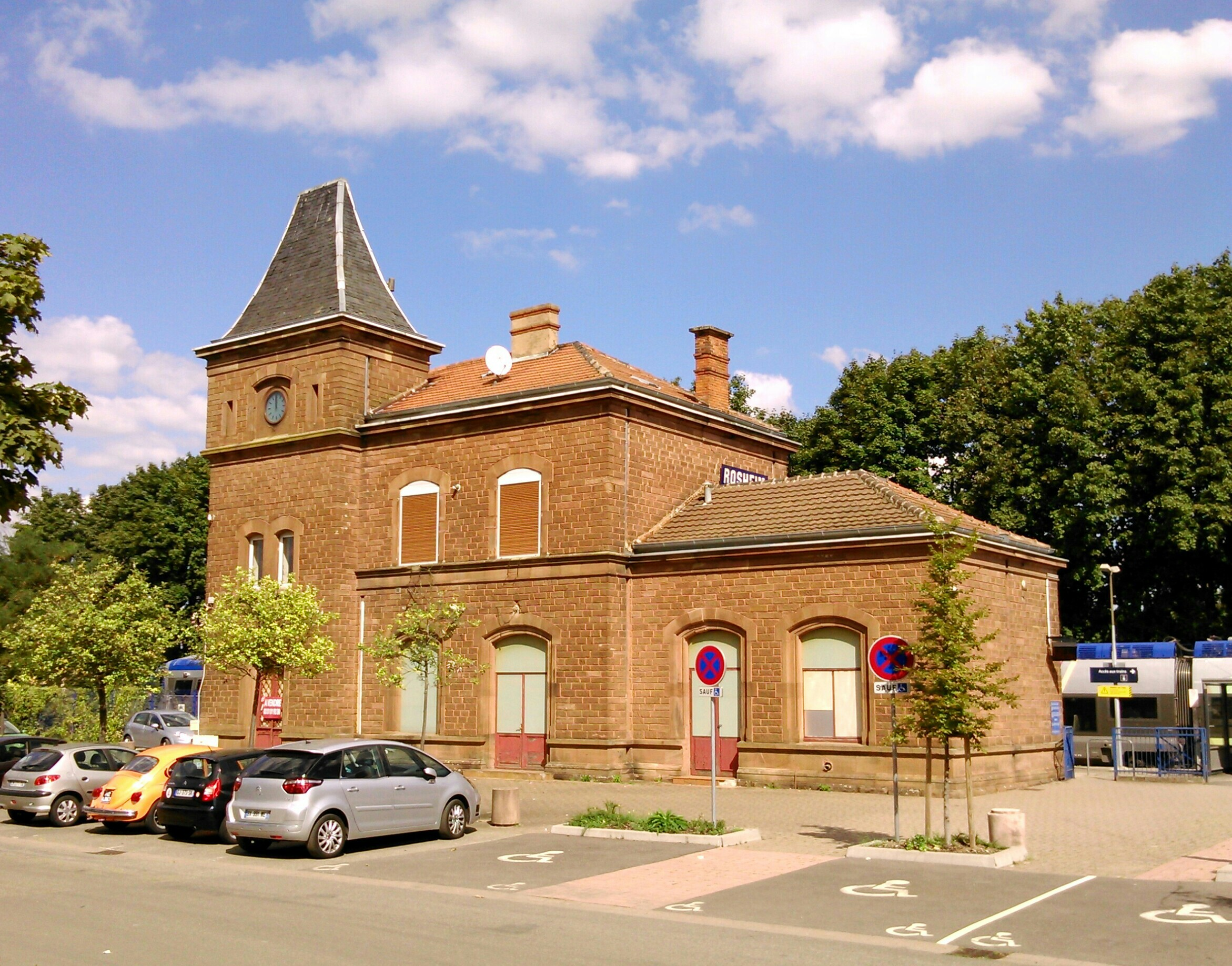
Rosheim station, built in pink sandstone.

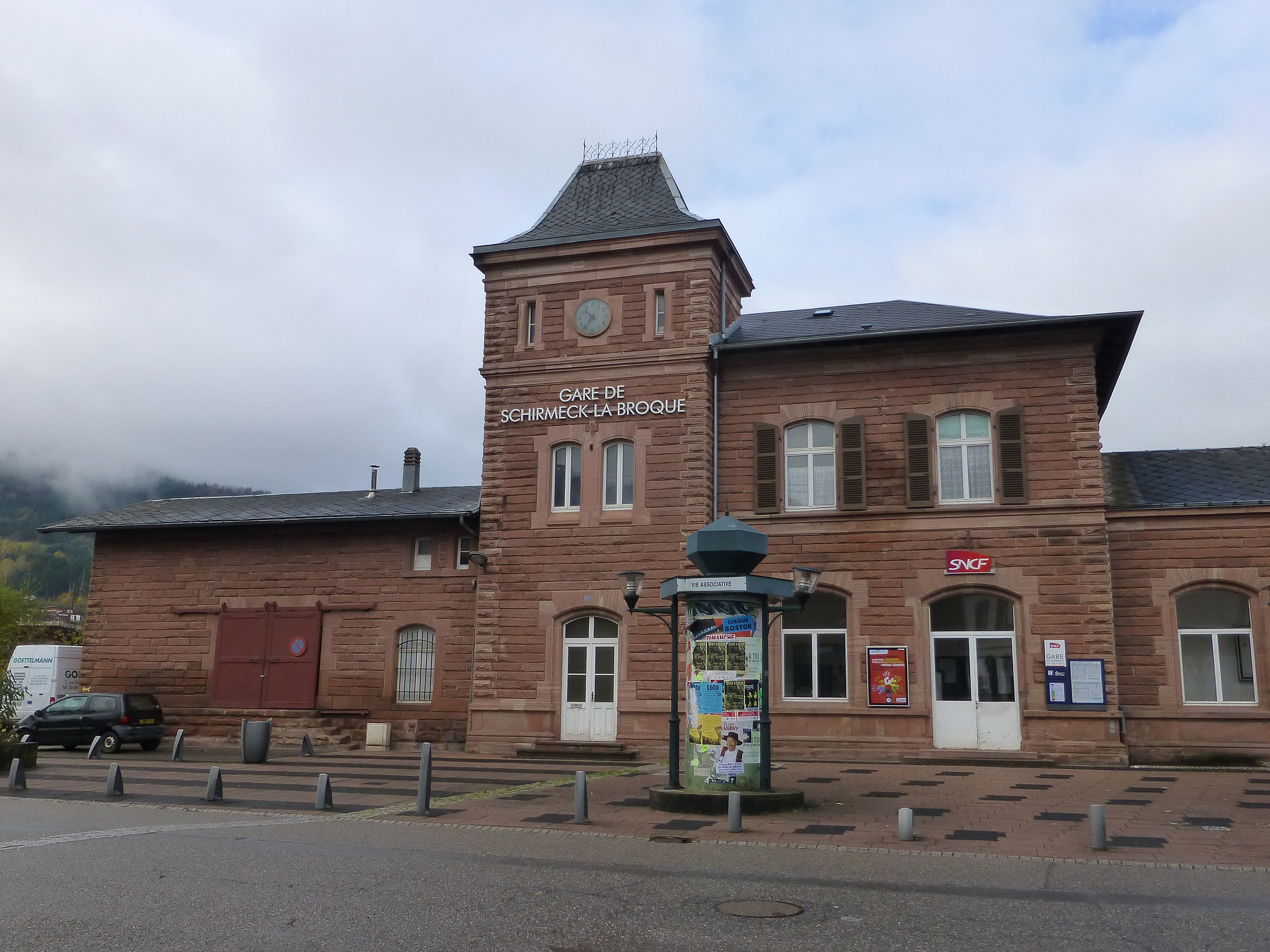
Schirmeck - La Broque station in the Vosges Mountains.

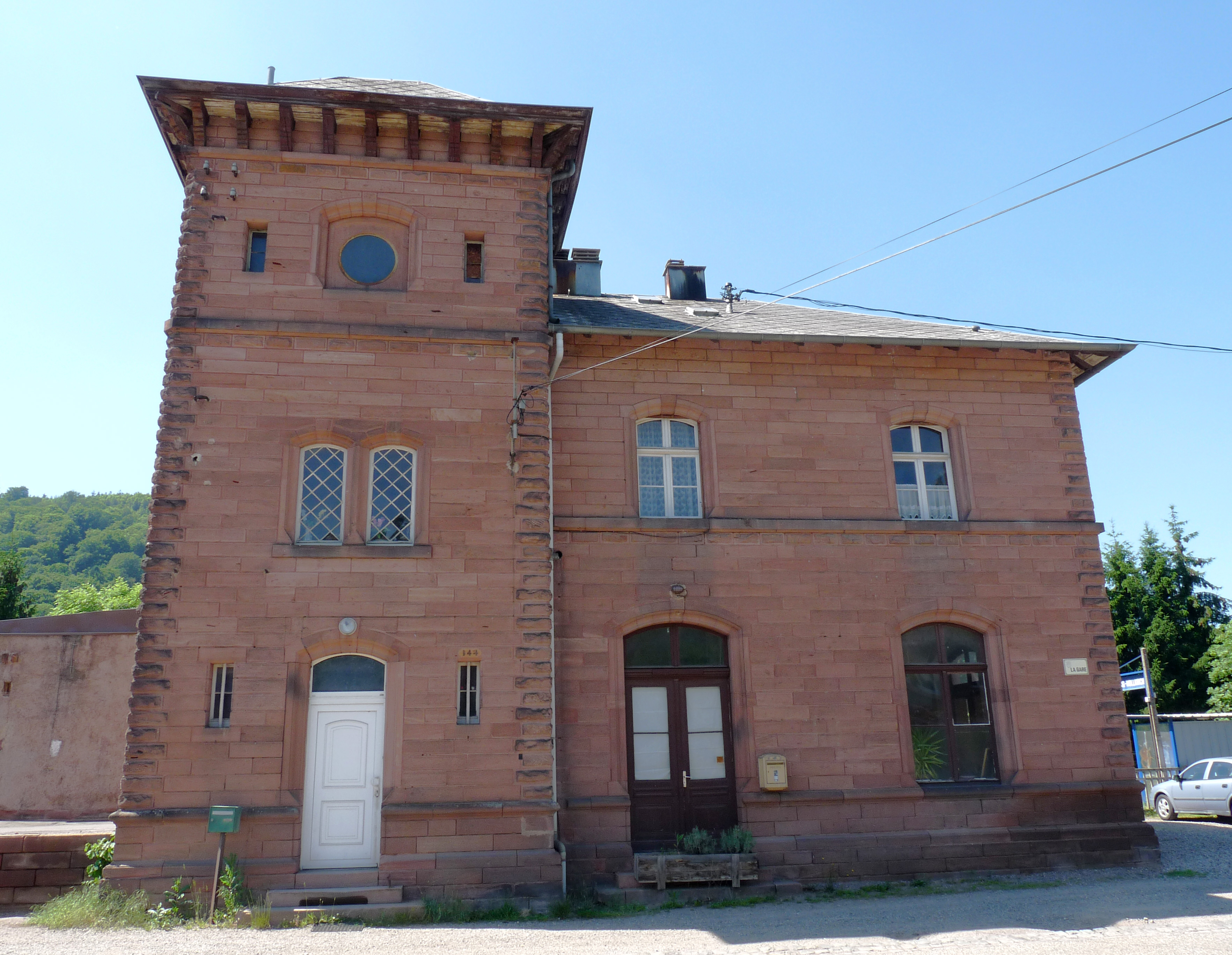
Rural Heiligenberg - Mollkirch station.

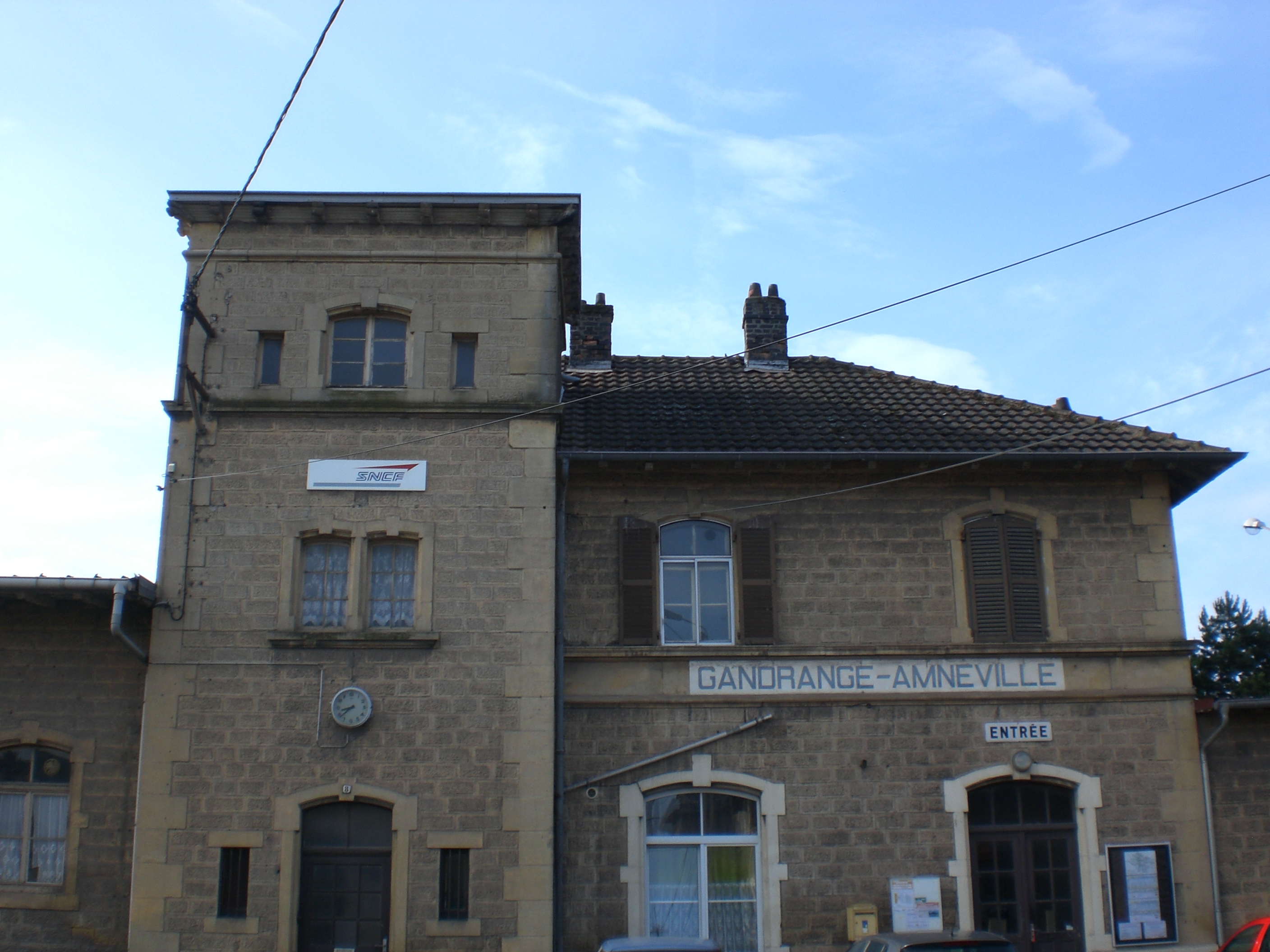
Small-scale Gandrange - Amnéville.

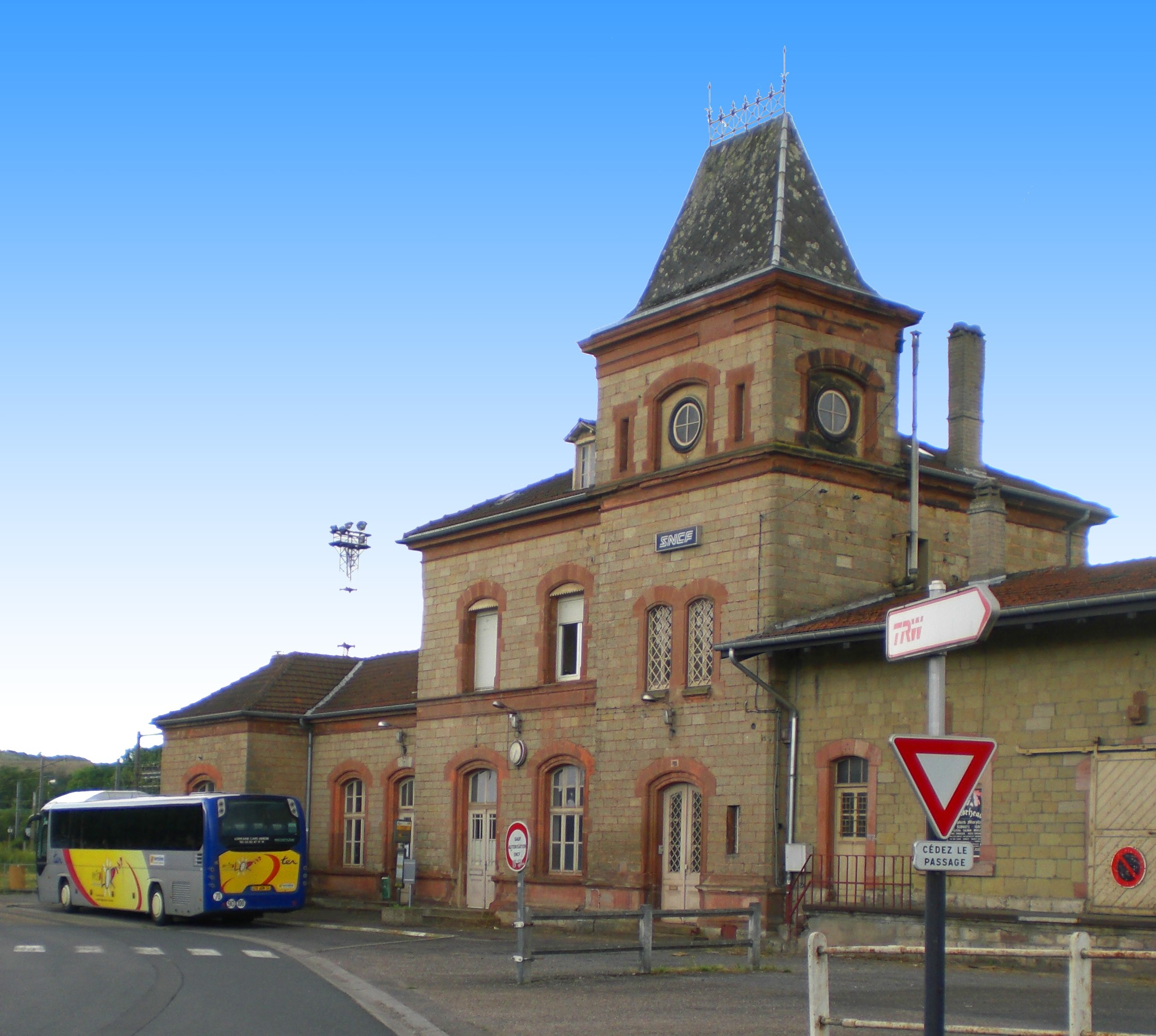
Bouzonville station, with distinctive window and door framing.

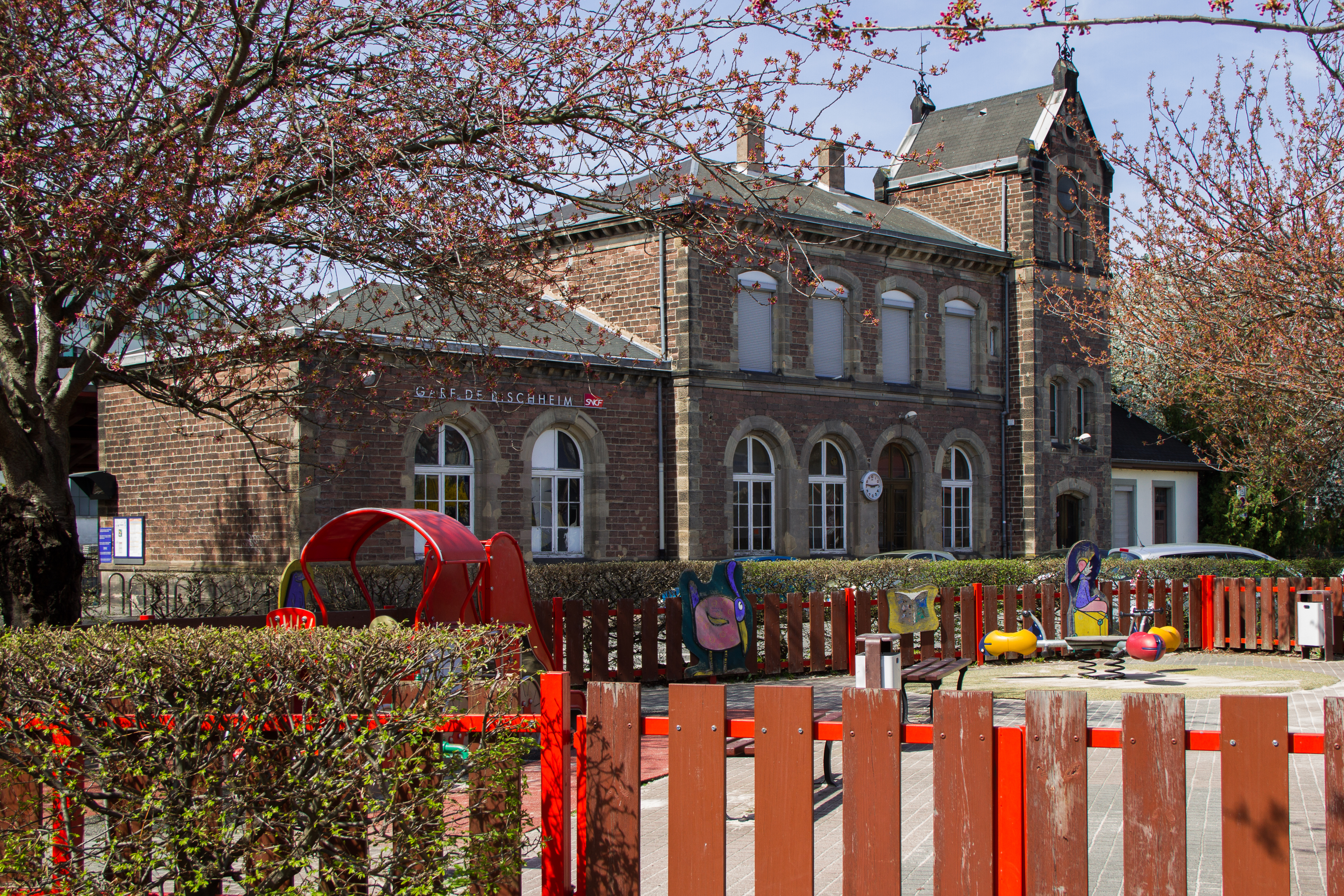
Bischheim station's tower, diverging from the usual "keep."

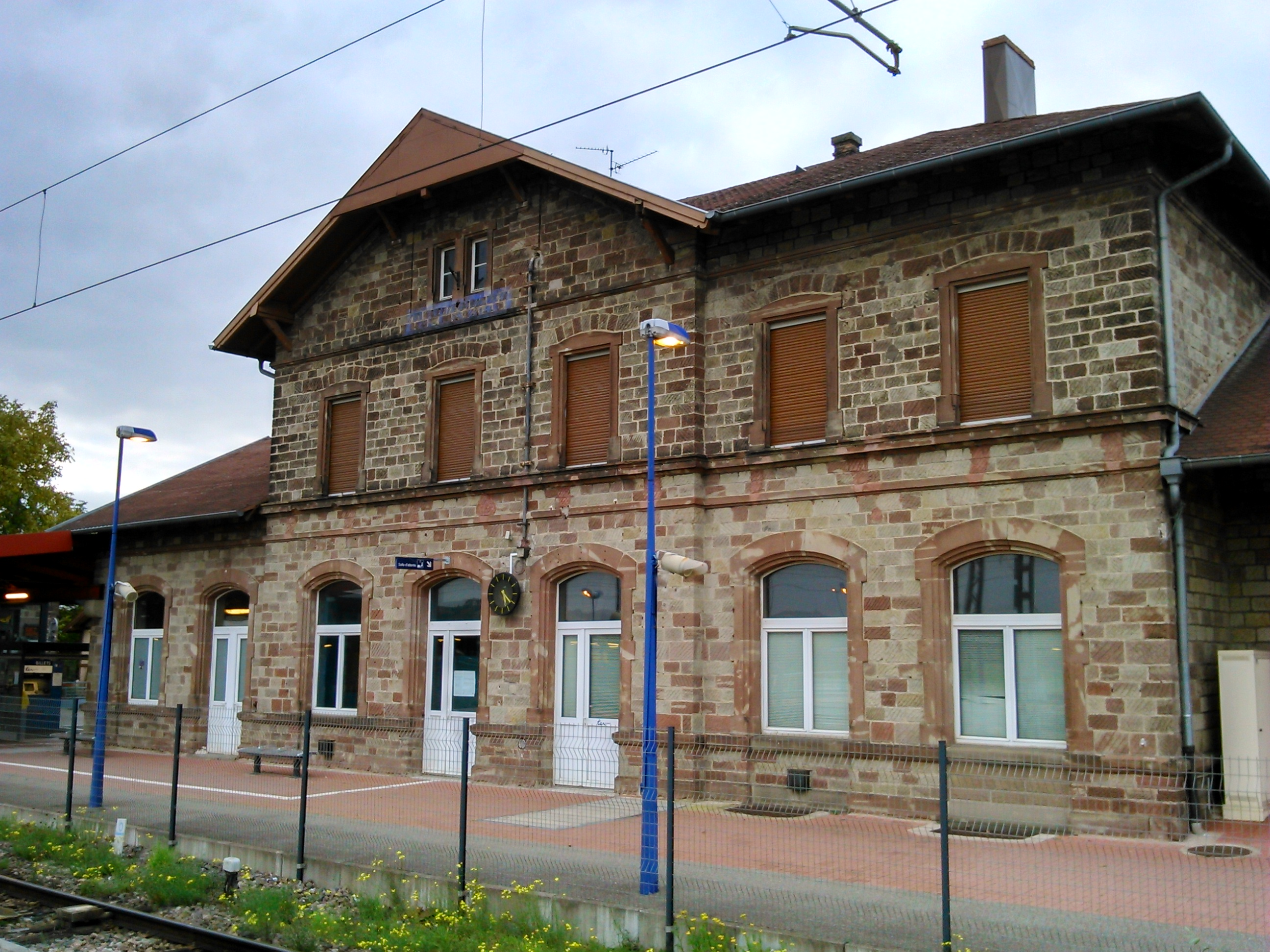
New Mommenheim station, in sandstone sans clock-tower.

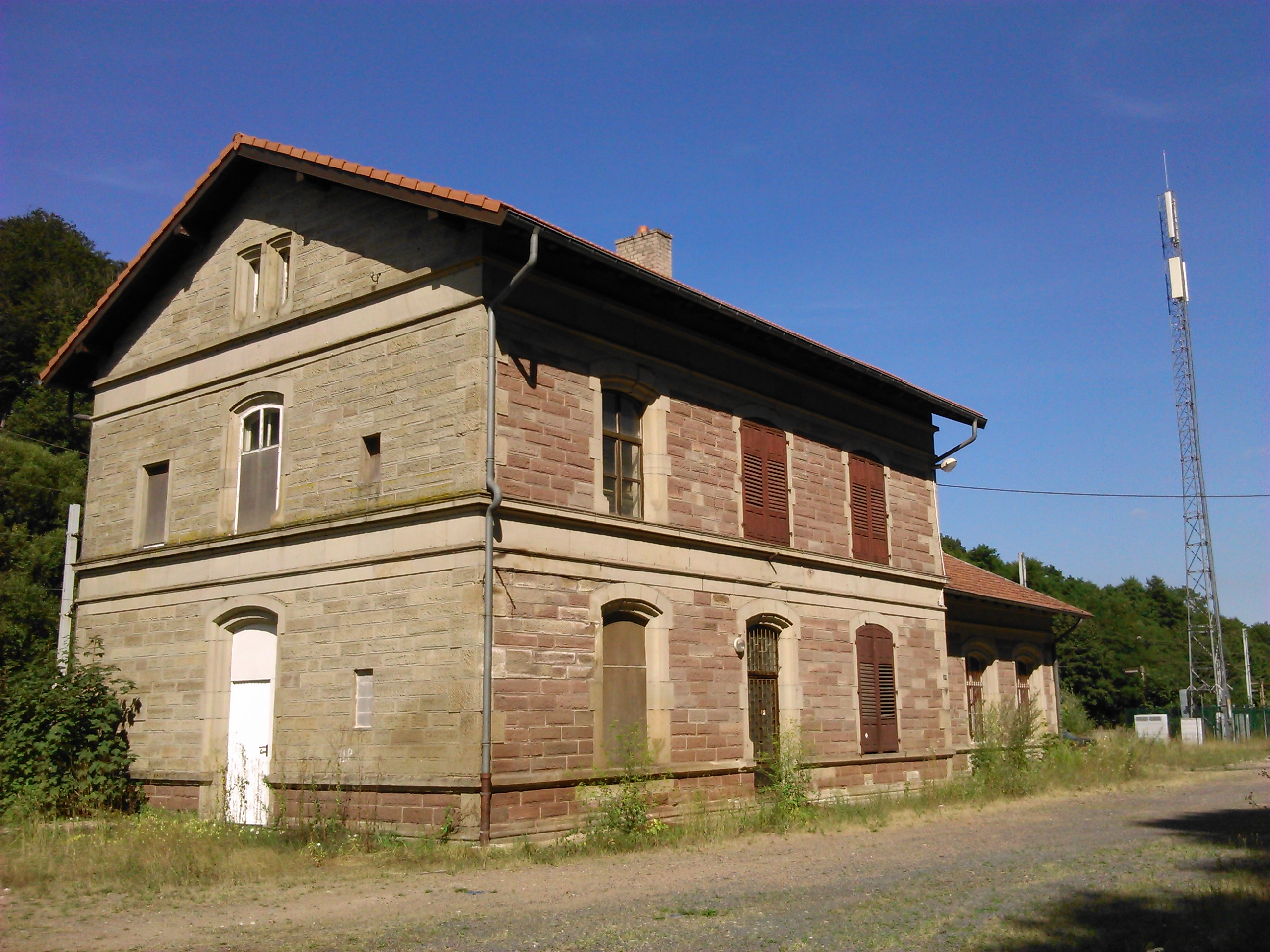
Small Arzviller station crossing the Vosges Mountains.

==== Monumental stations ====
Major Reichsland cities received striking, unique stations by renowned architects, meeting contemporary demands. In 1878, Strasbourg prioritized modernity and space with a neo-Renaissance European style. Thirty years later, under William II, Metz emphasized Germanization with a neo-Romanesque Rhenish flair. Meanwhile, Colmar station’s neo-Renaissance red brick echoes Gdańsk (then Danzig), built earlier at the empire's opposite end.

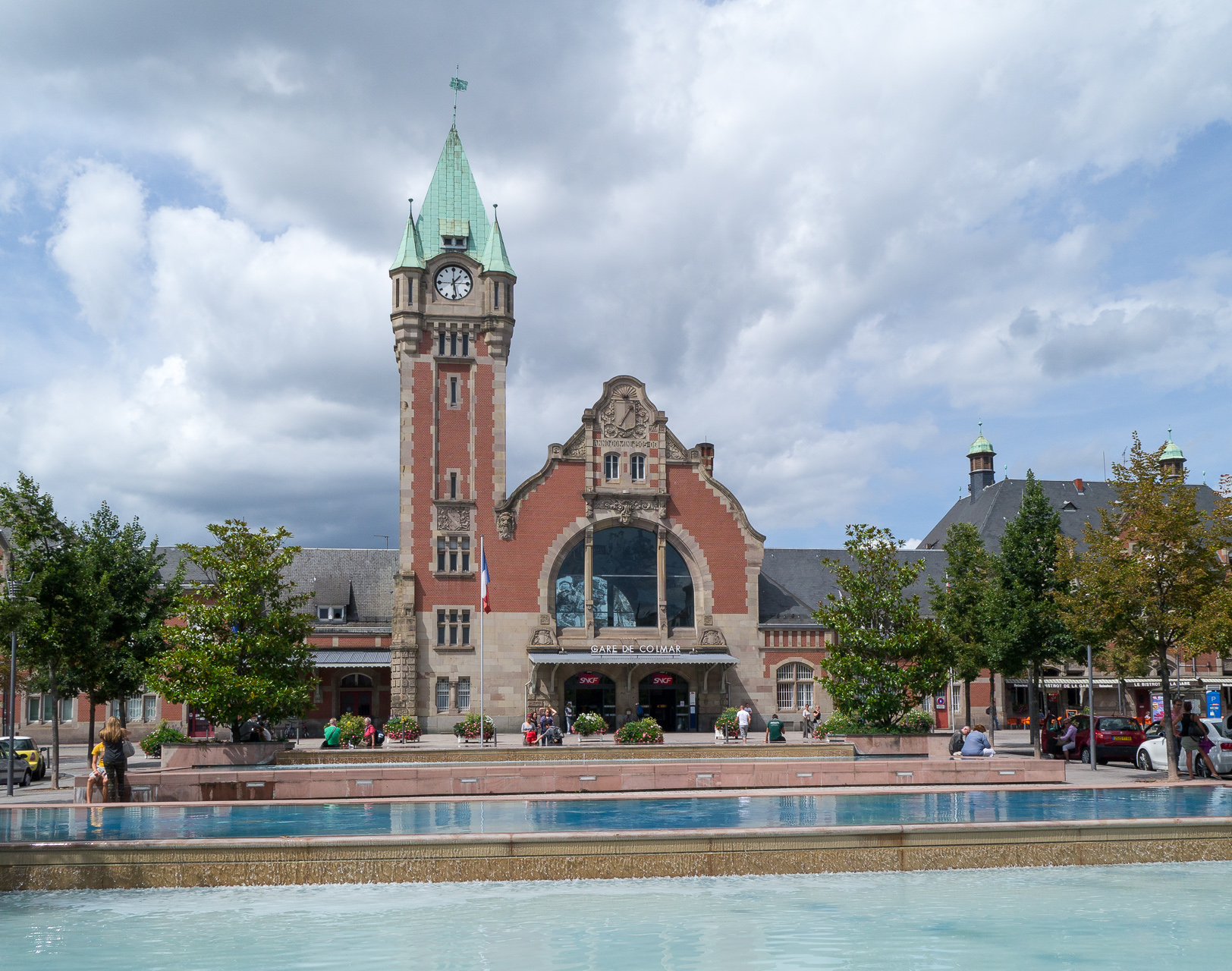
Colmar station

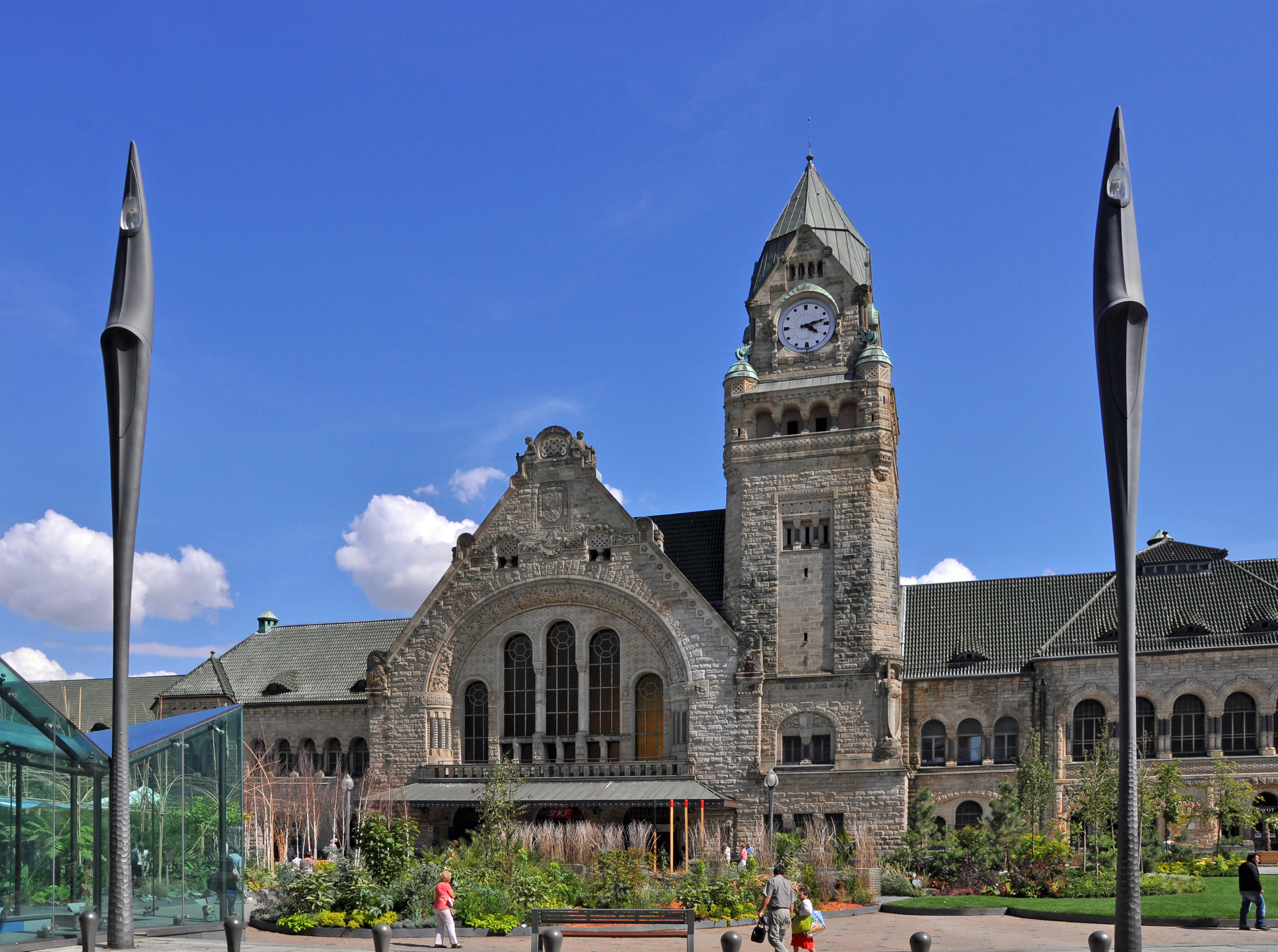
Metz-Ville station

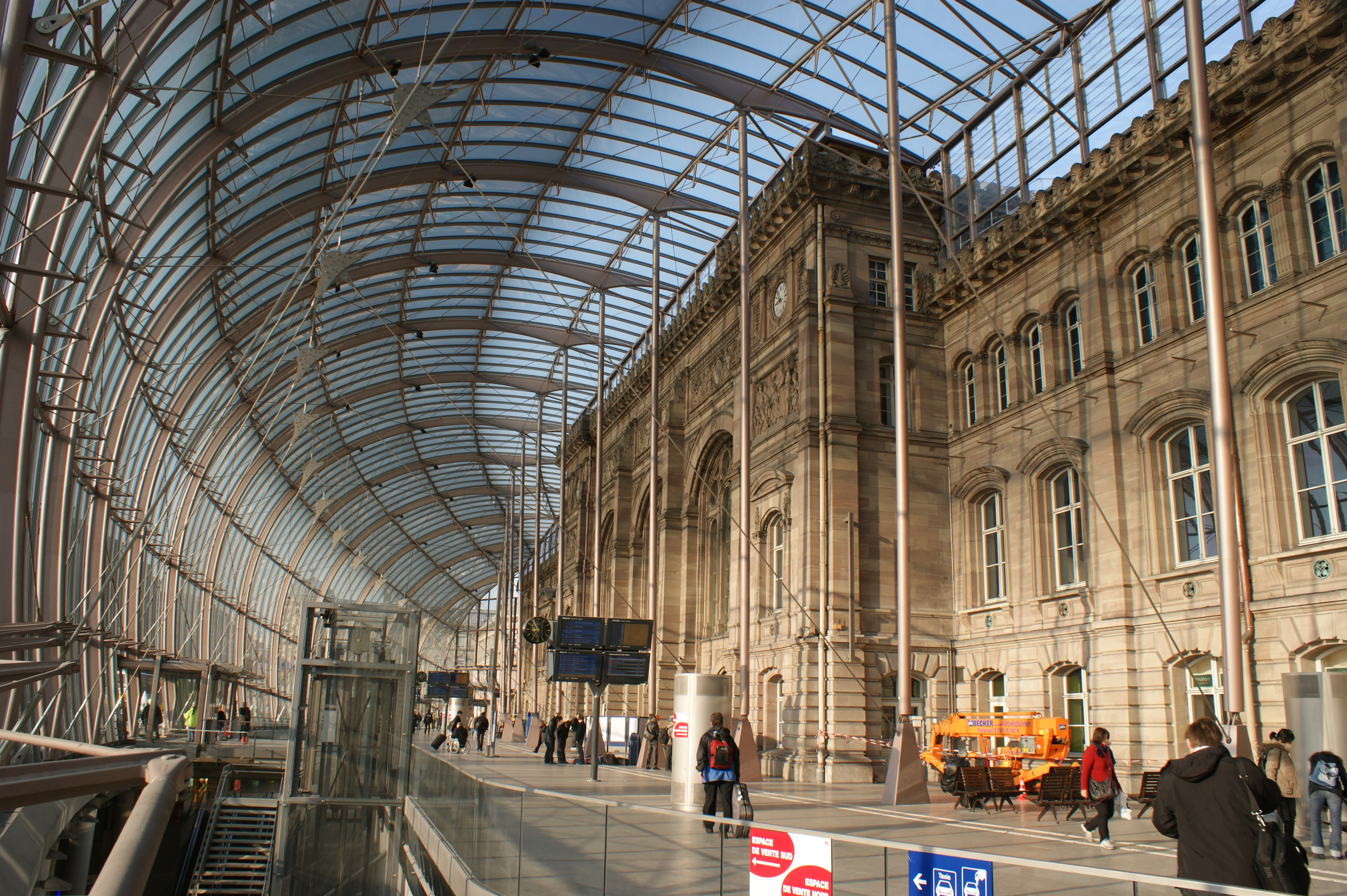
Strasbourg-Ville station

Ancillary facilities like signal boxes, roundhouses, freight stations, and water towers also boast notable designs. As hubs of urban rail networks, these central stations link to smaller halts, classification yards, or freight stations—over five each in Strasbourg and Metz. Their designs, often more distinctive than typical imperial stations, complement the main station.

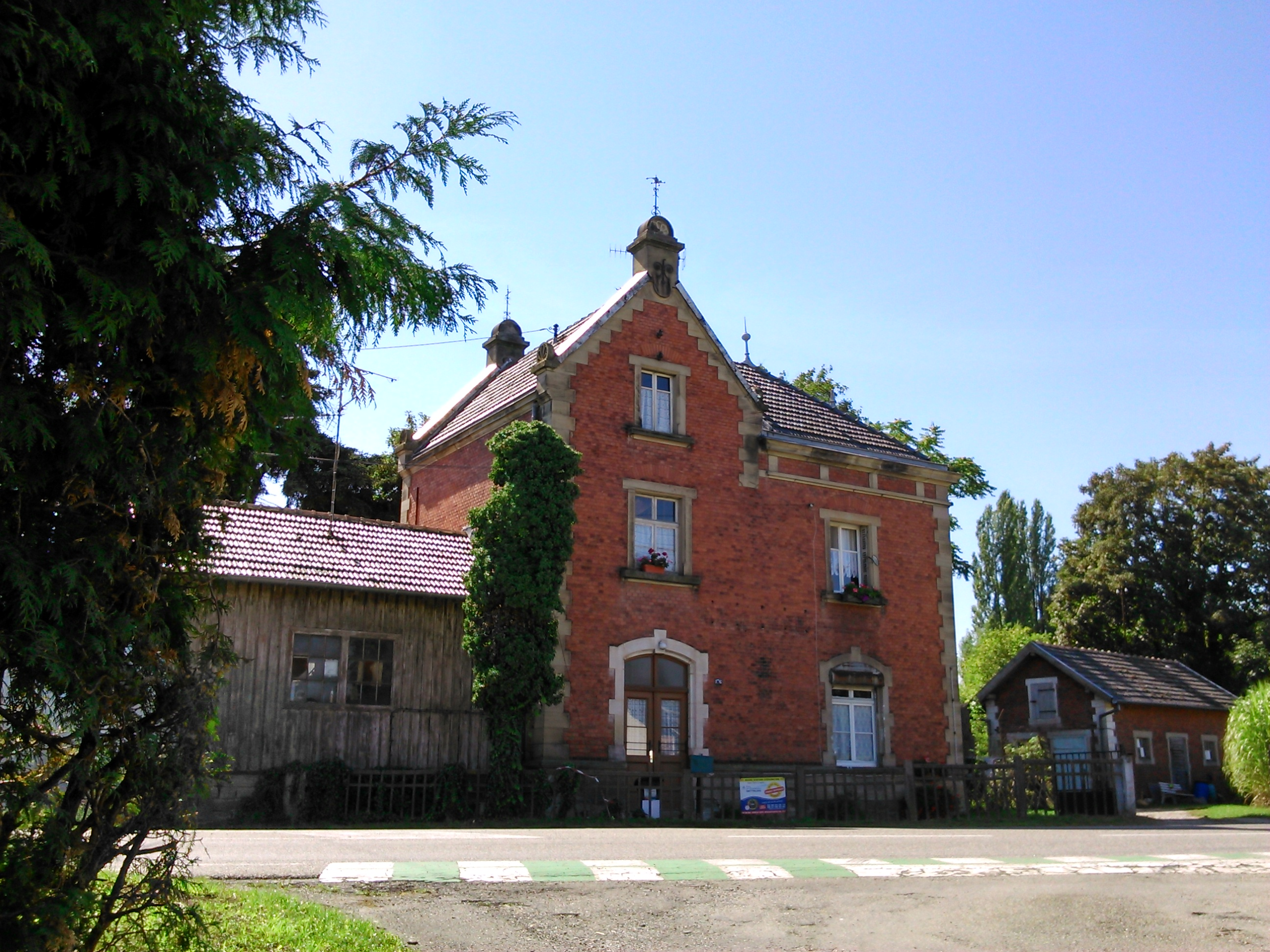
Colmar-Sud station.

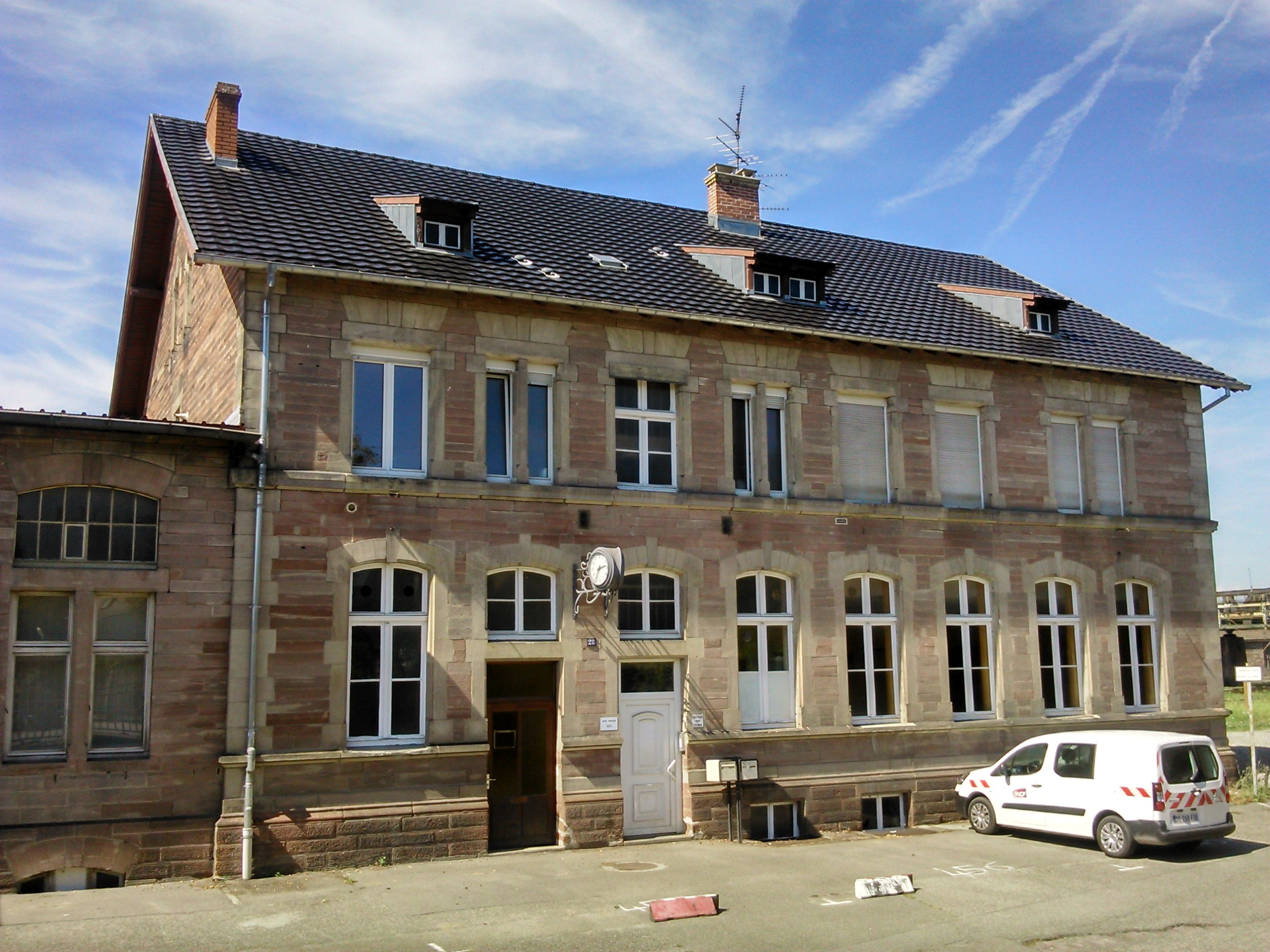
Colmar freight station.

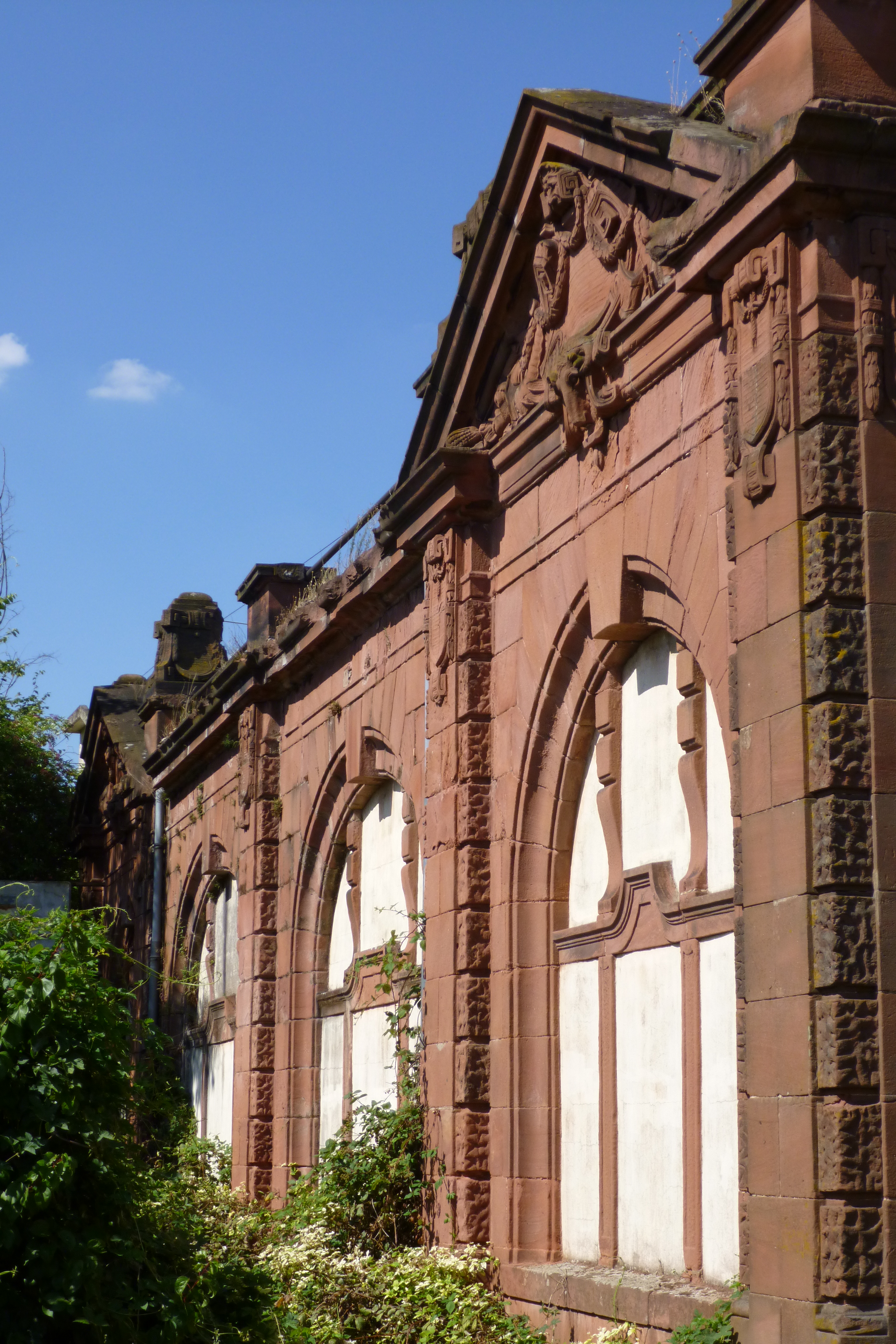
Disused Metz-Chambière.

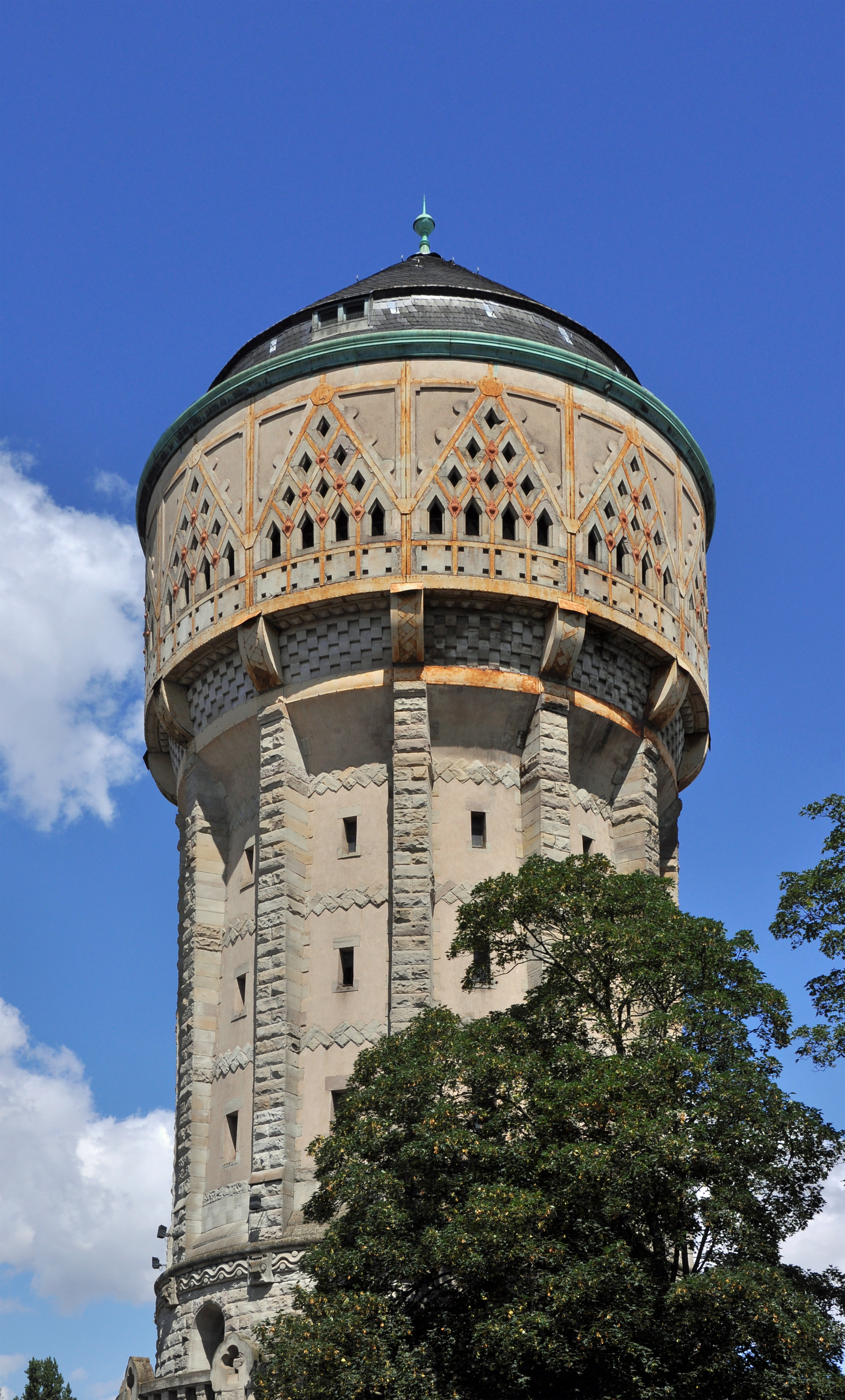
Metz-Ville station water tower.

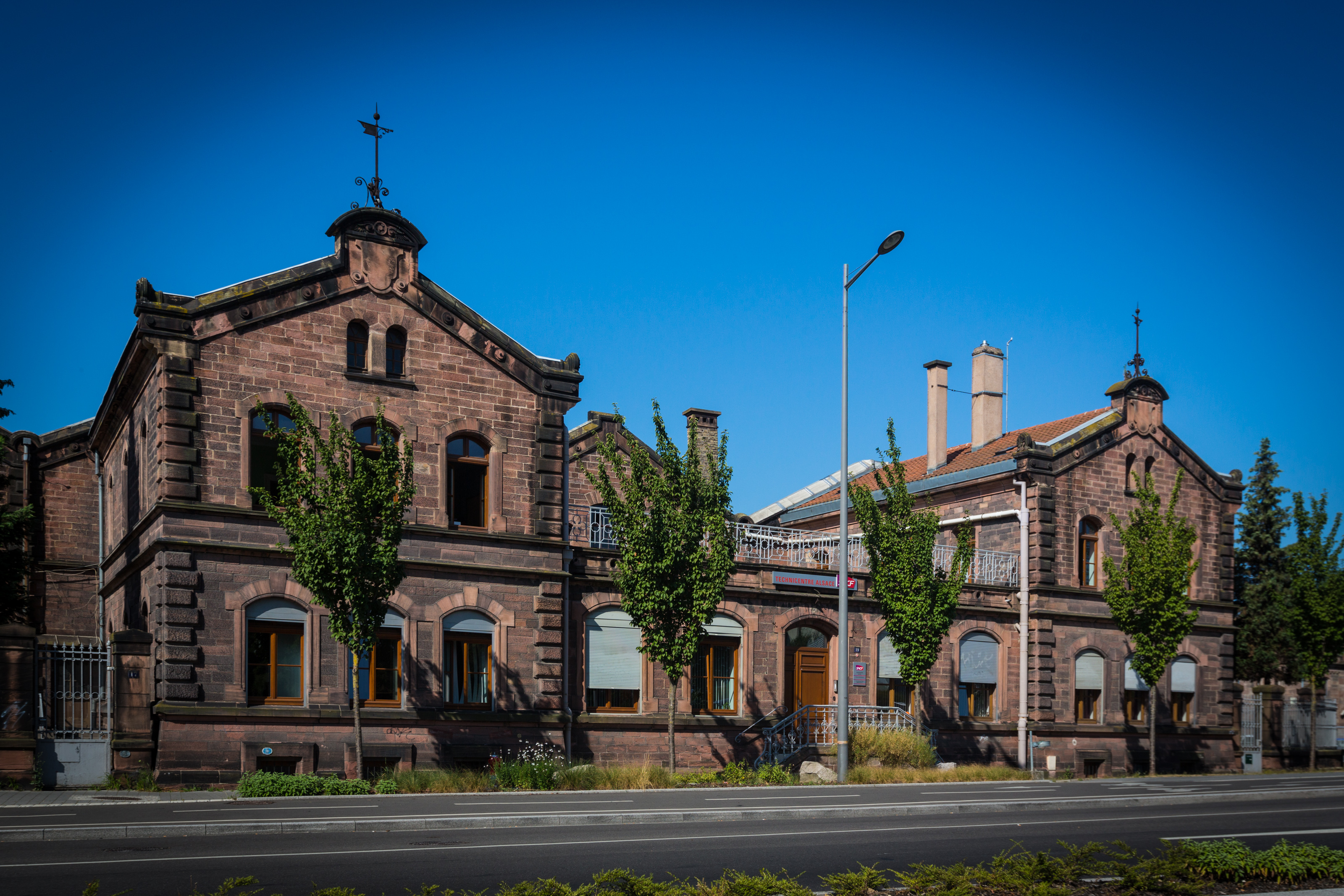
Strasbourg lower station.

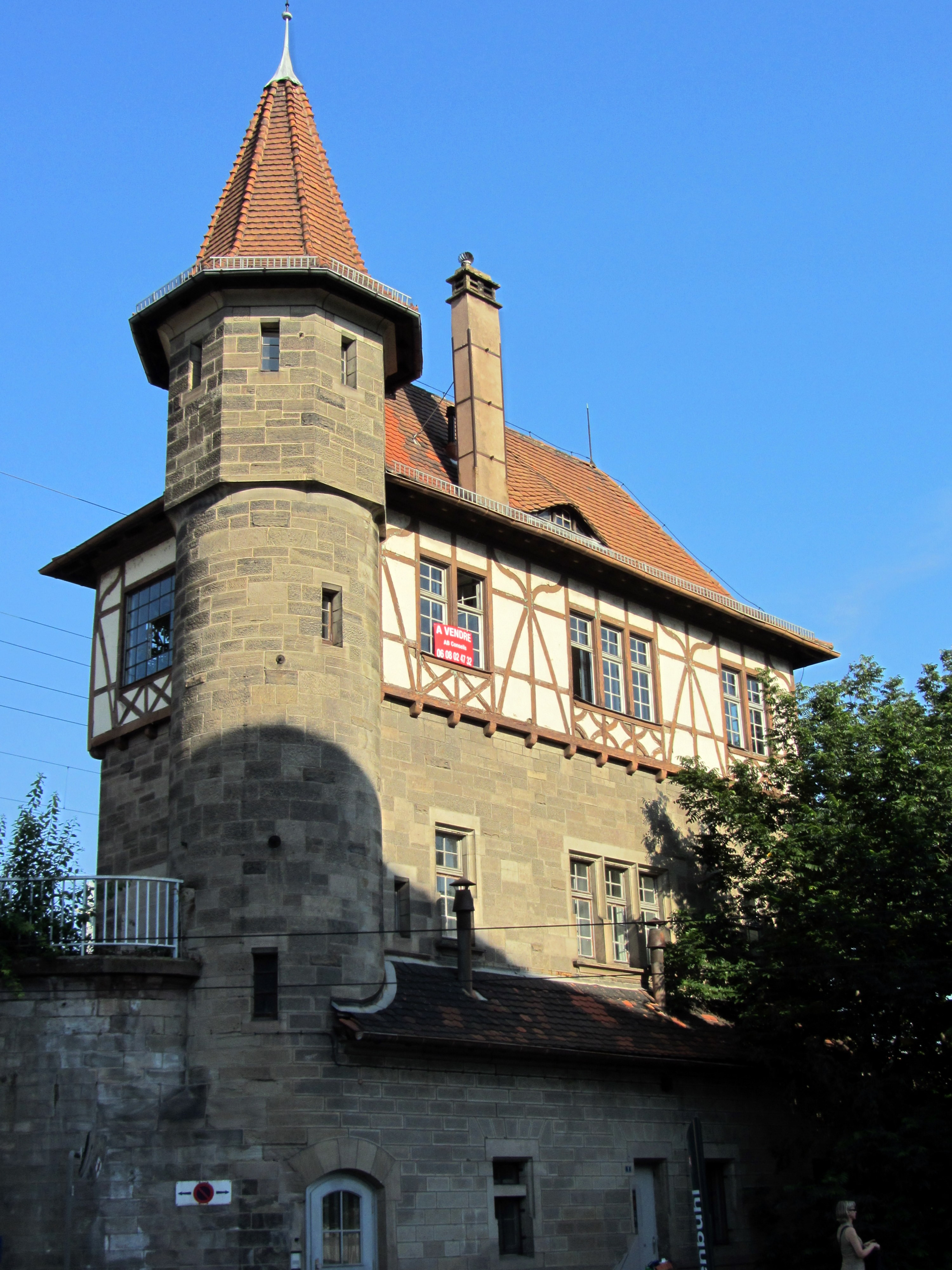
Former Krimmeri signal box in Strasbourg.

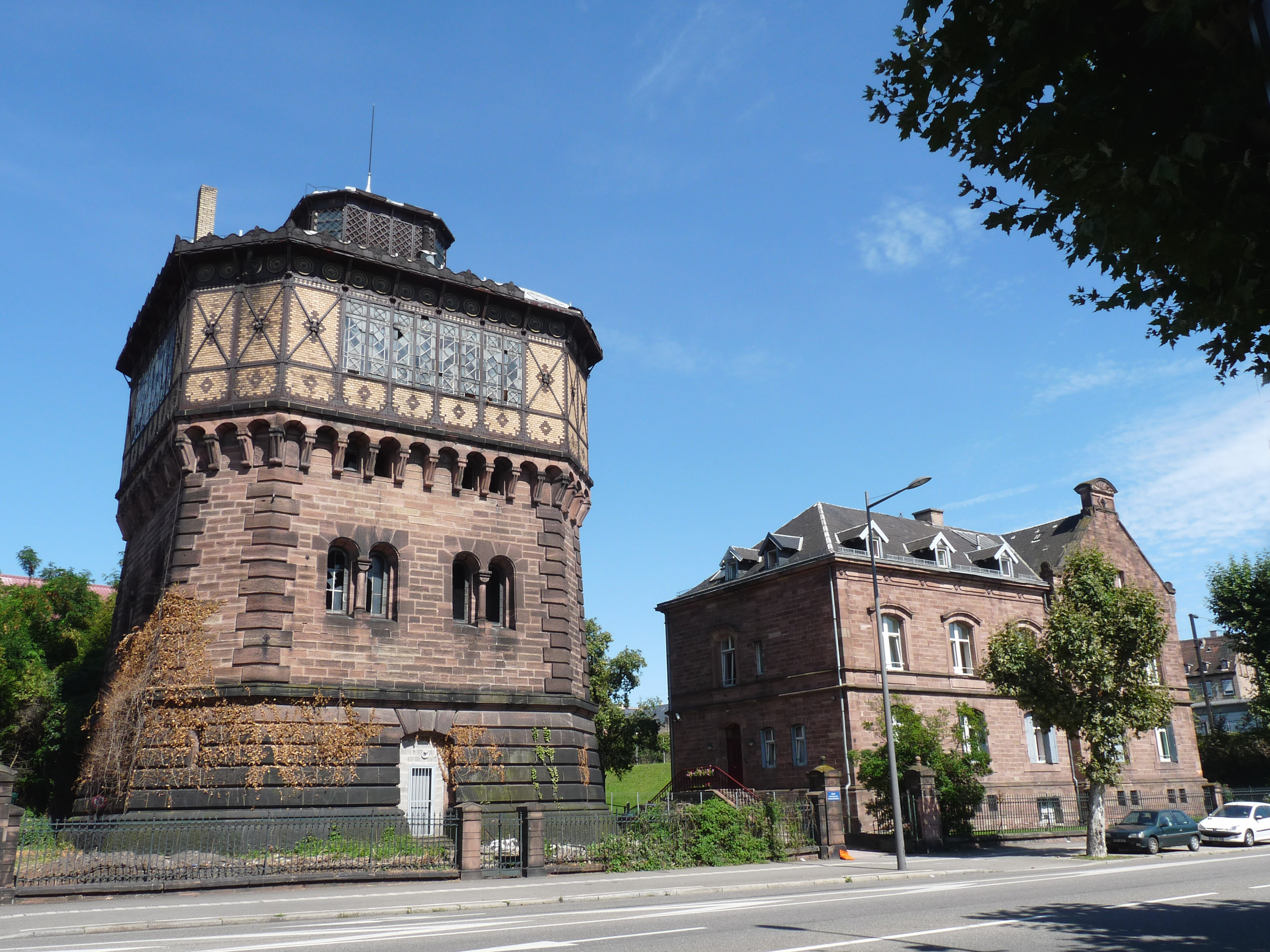
Strasbourg-Ville station water tower.

==== Border stations ====
During the Reichsland era, all French trains terminated at the grand border station of Nouvel-Avricourt (then Deutsch-Avricourt) in Moselle, requiring a train change. Another key border station was Montreux-Vieux station in Haut-Rhin. Chambrey, on the now-decommissioned and dismantled Nancy to Château-Salins line, was notable despite its smaller size. A lesser border station, Amanvillers, on the partially decommissioned Conflans – Jarny to Metz railway, was destroyed in World War II.

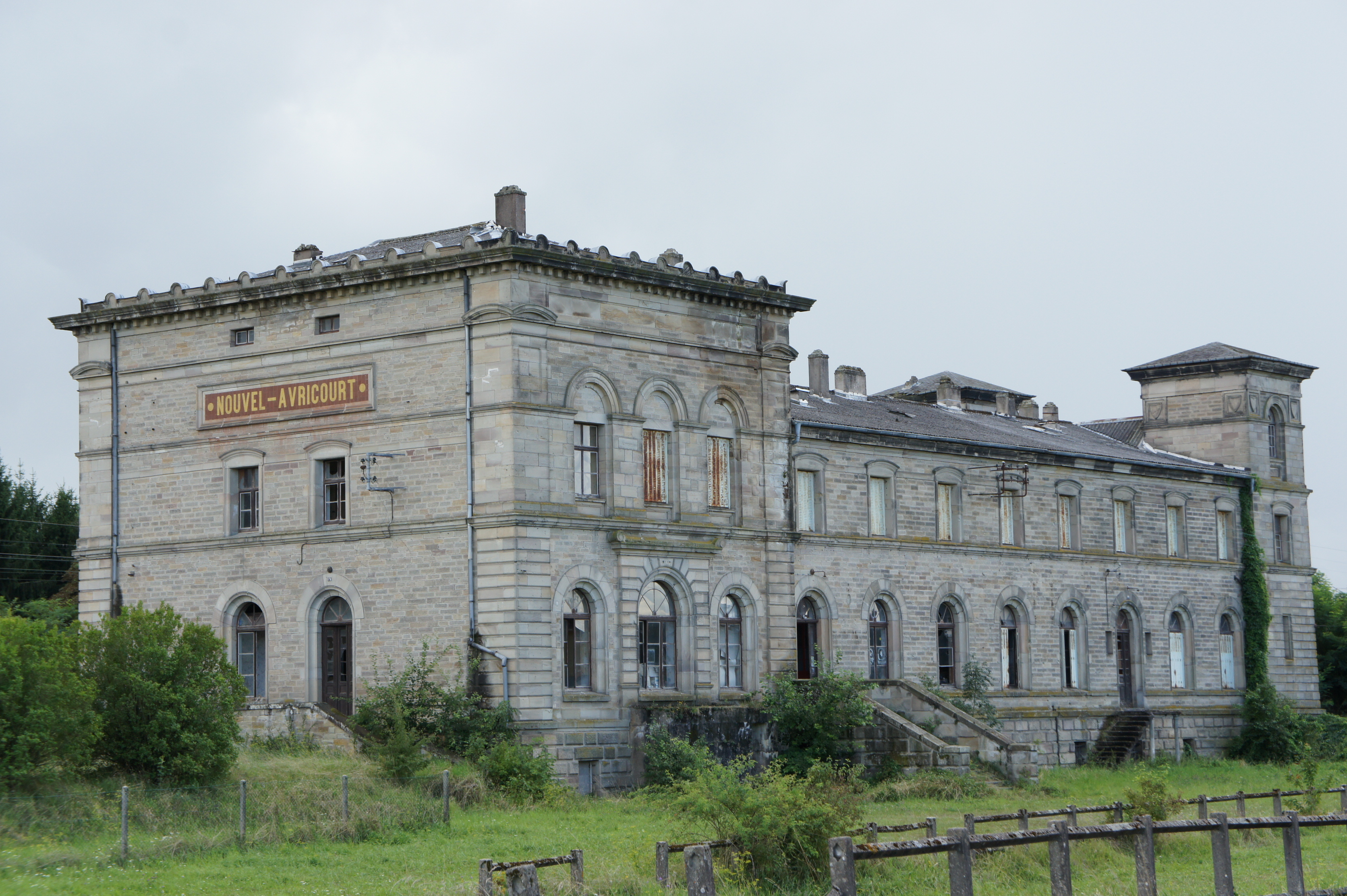
Disused Nouvel-Avricourt station.

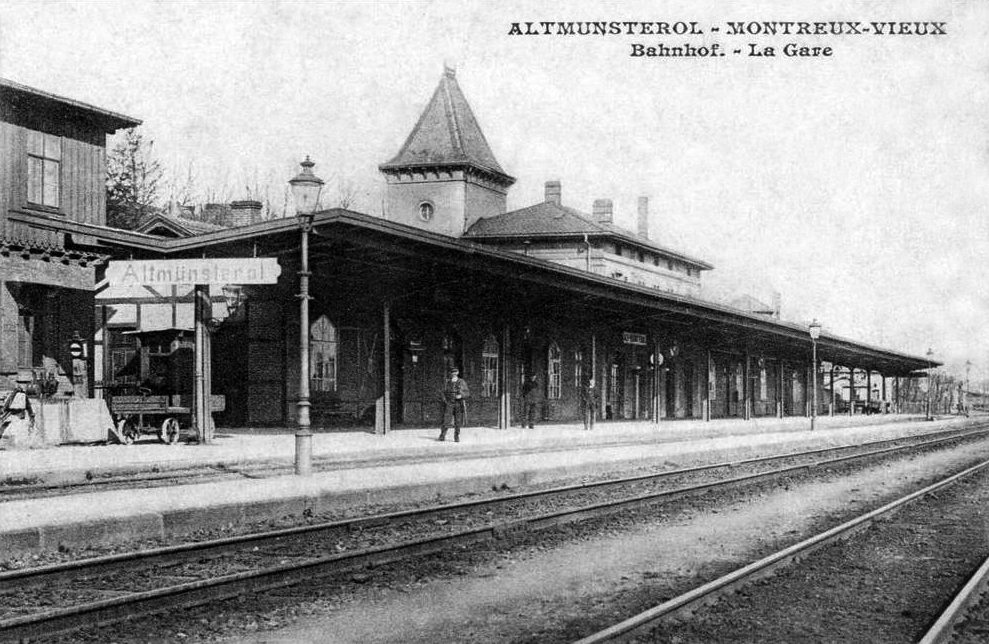
Montreux-Vieux station in the early 20th century.

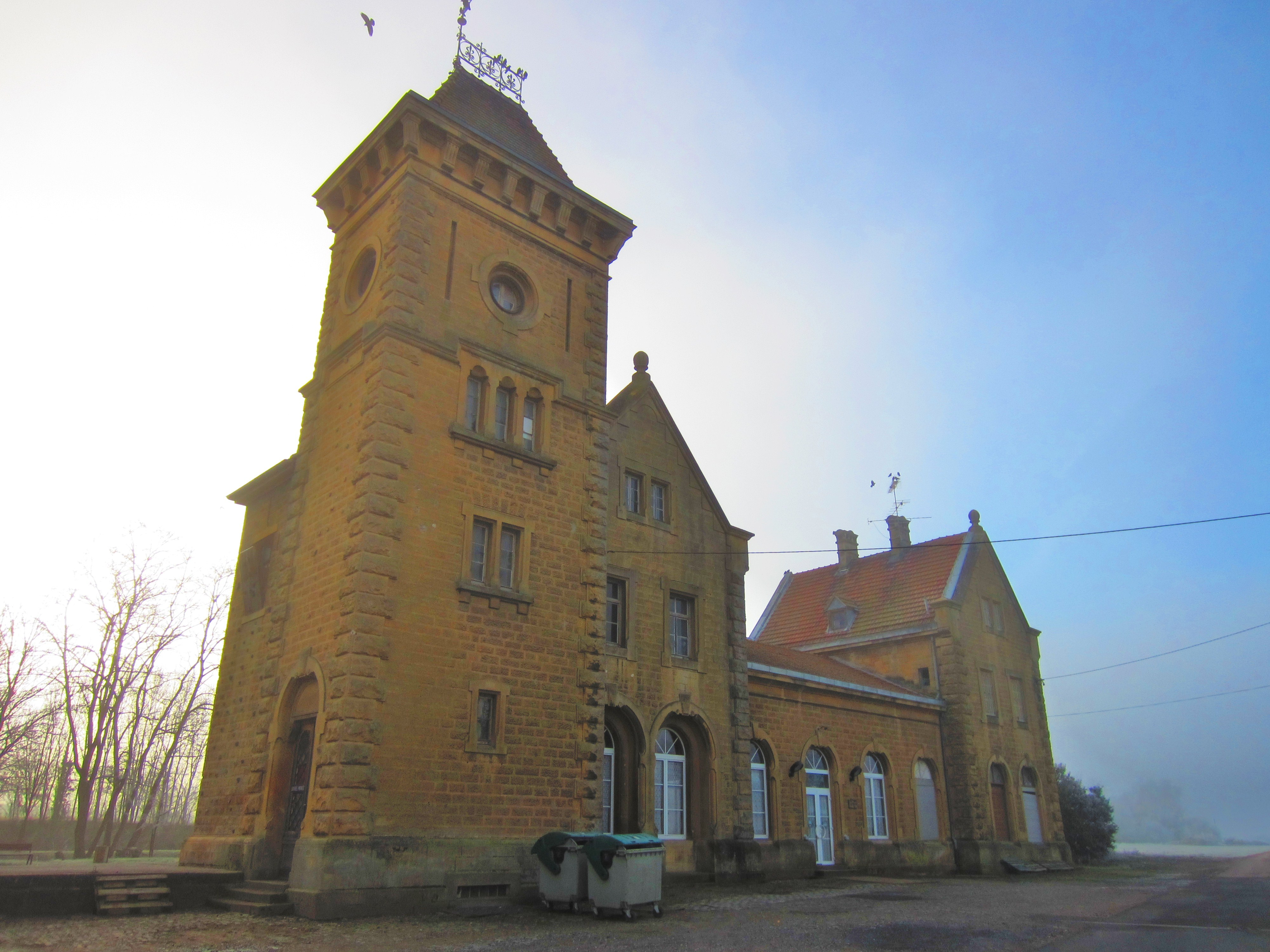
Disused imperial Chambrey station.

== See also ==
=== Related articles ===
- Reichsland Elsass-Lothringen: Alsace-Lorraine as a German Empire subdivision, 1871–1918.
- Alsace-Lorraine: Sociological and political impacts of the 1871 annexation.
- Alsace-Moselle: Current status of French departments formerly under Germany.
- Annexations of Alsace-Lorraine: History of the 1871 and 1940 annexations.

=== External links ===
- Elsassbahn.free.fr, site on Alsace-Lorraine railways.
- Trainalsace.pagesperso-orange.fr, site on Alsace and Lorraine railways.

== Bibliography ==
- Linard, André (1998). Sarrebourg parle de sa gare [Sarrebourg Speaks of Its Station: Sarrebourg, Moselle]. Documents / Société d'histoire et d'archéologie de Lorraine (in French) (Updated 2007 ed.). Sarrebourg: Société d'histoire et d'archéologie de Lorraine. p. 191. ISBN 978-2-909433-42-4.
