= 1919 in rail transport =

This article lists events related to rail transport that occurred in 1919.

== Events ==
=== March events ===
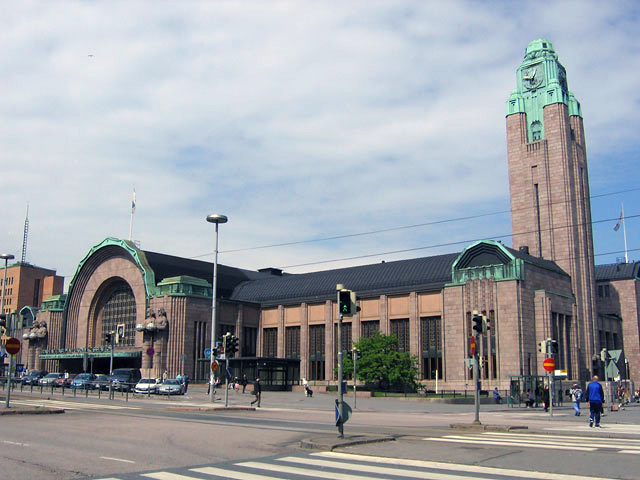
Helsinki station

- March 5 – Rebuilt Helsinki Central railway station officially opened (architect: Eliel Saarinen).

=== April events ===
- April 12 – Ryutaro Nomura succeeds Simbei Kunisawa for a second term as president of South Manchuria Railway.

=== May events ===
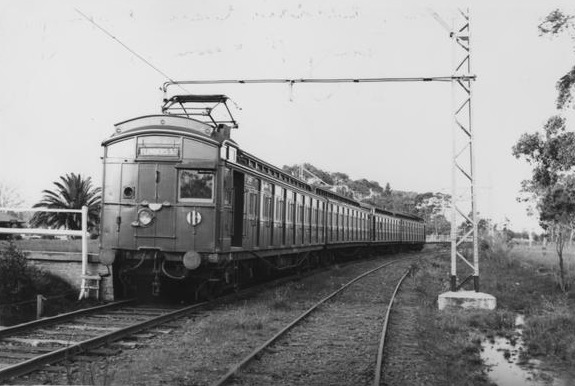
4-car Tait train at Spring Vale Cemetery station, Melbourne

- May 28 – Official inauguration of electrified suburban railways in Melbourne, Australia, with first train from Flinders Street station to Sandringham and Essendon.

=== September events ===
- September 27–October 6 – Railway workers in the United Kingdom stage a strike, called by the National Union of Railwaymen.

=== October events ===
- October 17 – Madrid Metro opens.
- October 20 – The metre-gauge railway from La Paz (Bolivia) to Cumbre opens.

=== November events ===
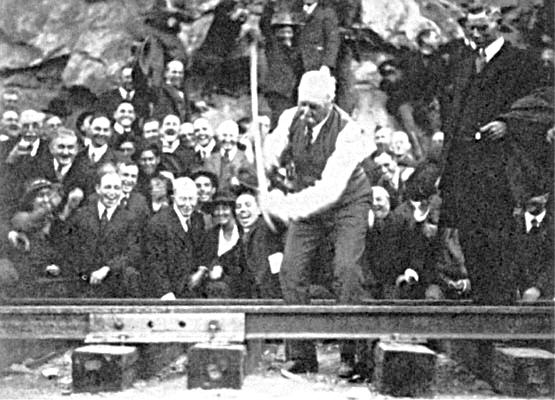
J.D. Spreckels drives the "golden spike" on the San Diego & Arizona Railway

- November 15 – The golden spike is driven and construction of the San Diego and Arizona Railway is completed at a cost of $18 million.

=== December events ===
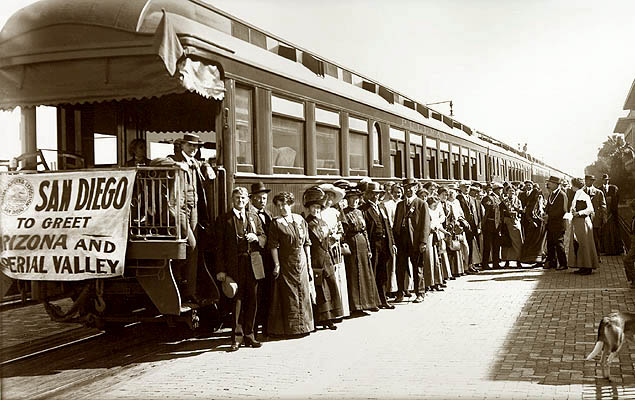
First passenger train on San Diego & Arizona Railway

- December 1
  - The first passenger train of the San Diego & Arizona Railway "arrives" in San Diego from El Centro, California, for the official line opening ceremony.
  - The Canadian Railway War Board is reorganized as the Railway Association of Canada.

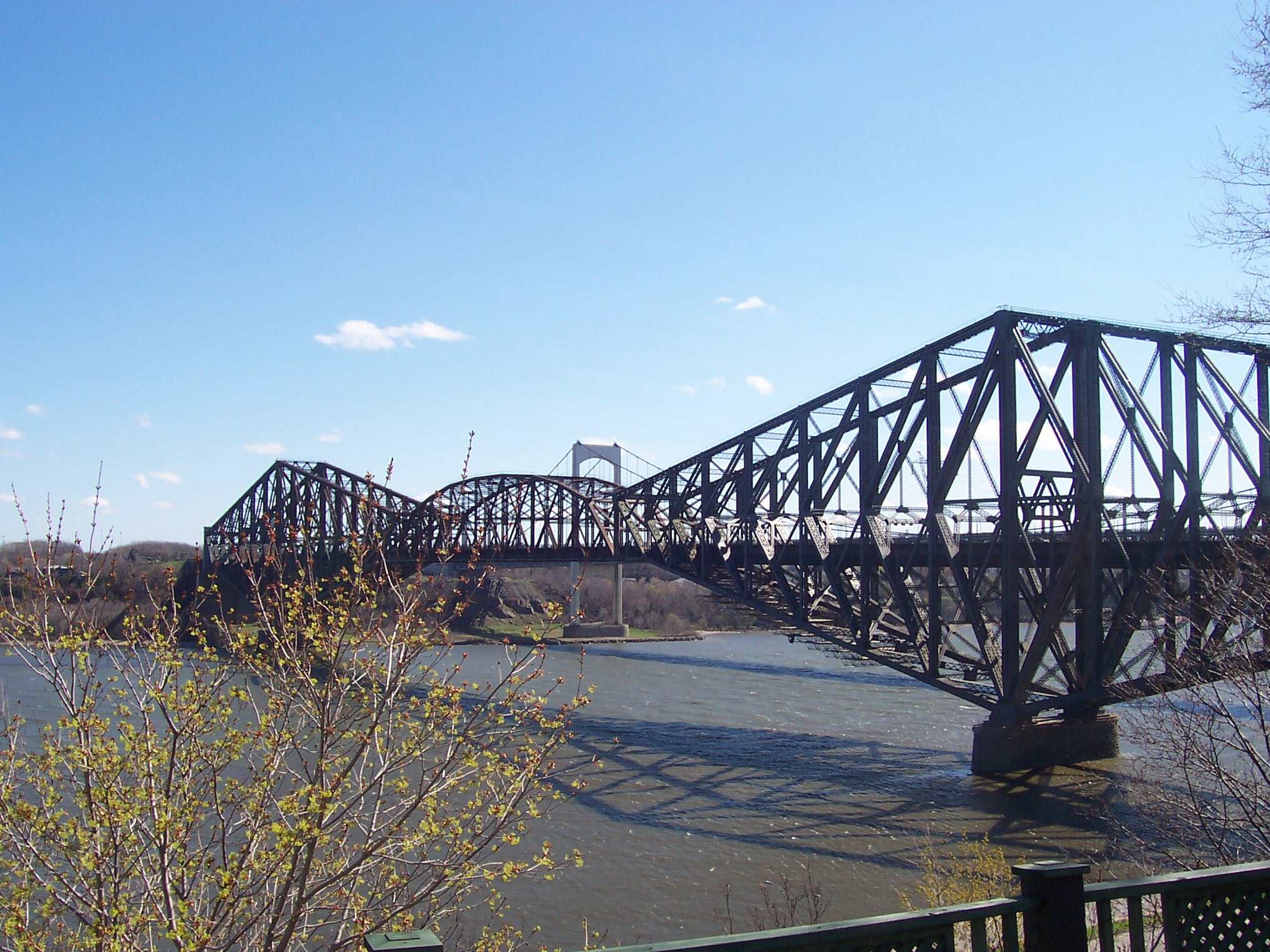
Quebec Bridge

- December 3 – The Quebec Bridge, operated by Canadian National Railways, opens to rail traffic after almost two decades of construction. It is 987 meters (3,238 ft) long, incorporating the longest cantilever bridge span in the world at 549 meters (1,801 ft).
- December 20 – Onawa train wreck: A collision on the International Railway of Maine kills 23 people.

=== Unknown date events ===
- Ralph Budd becomes president of the Great Northern Railway and becomes the youngest (40) president of any American railroad to date.
- The Federal Trade Commission orders Armour & Co. to sell its produce-hauling subsidiary, Fruit Growers Express (FGE), for antitrust reasons.
- Jewett Car Company, a Newark, Ohio, producer of interurban cars and trolleys, closes after 25 years in production.

== Deaths ==
=== February deaths ===
- February 23 - Guy Calthrop, general manager of London and North Western Railway, previously of Buenos Aires and Pacific Railway (born 1870).

=== April deaths ===
- April 24 - Zhan Tianyou, Chief Engineer responsible for construction of the Imperial Peking-Kalgan Railway, the first railway constructed in China without foreign assistance (born 1861).

=== August deaths ===
- August 3 - Samuel W. Fordyce, president of St. Louis, Arkansas and Texas Railway 1886-1889, St. Louis Southwestern Railway 1890-1898, Kansas City Southern Railway 1900 (born 1840).
- August 11 - Andrew Carnegie, steel magnate and owner of Pittsburgh Locomotive and Car Works (born 1835).

=== October deaths ===
- October 10 - Anatole Mallet, inventor of the Mallet locomotive type (born 1837).
