= 1946 in rail transport =

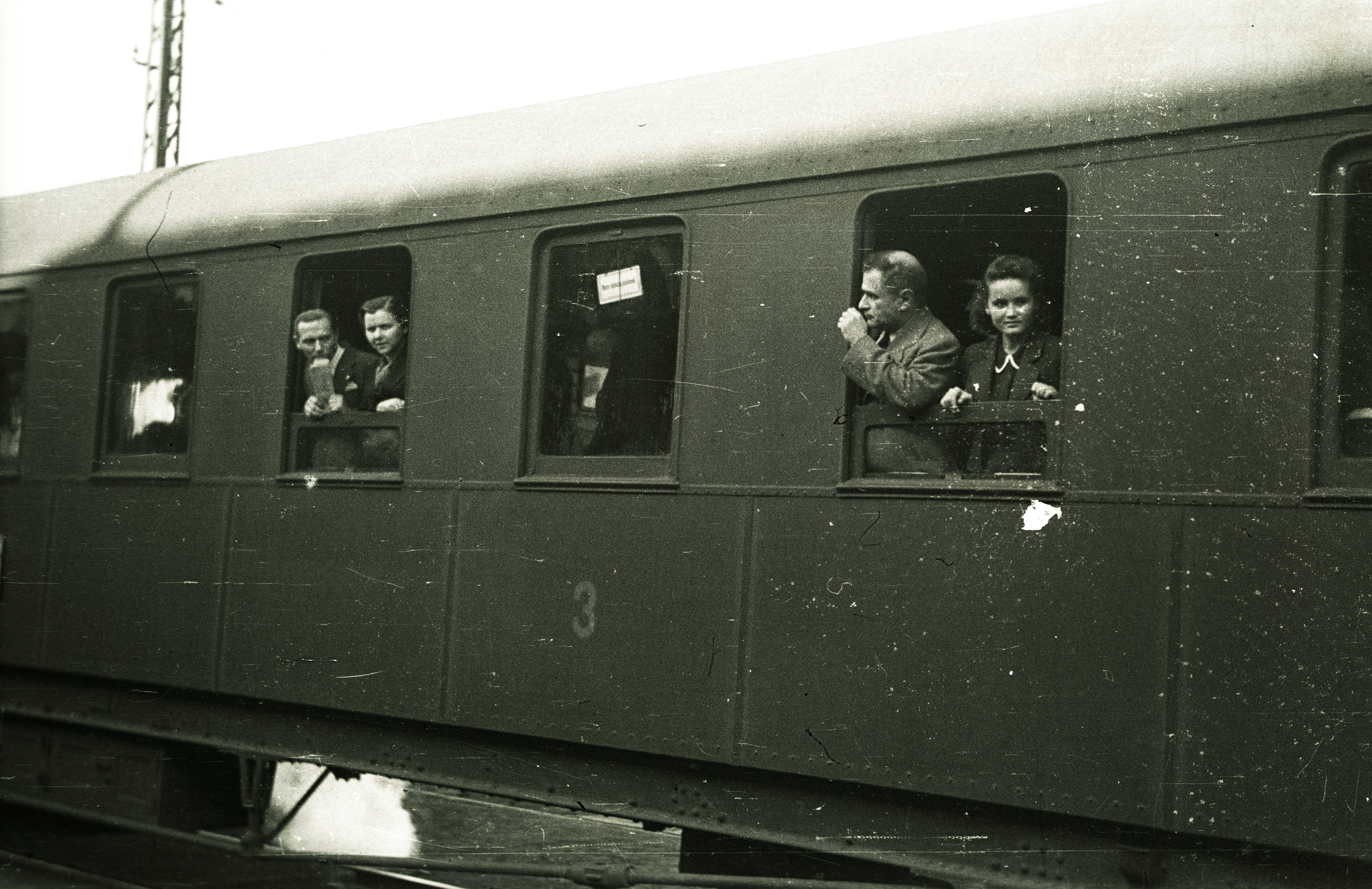

This article lists events related to rail transport that occurred in 1946.

== Events ==
=== January events ===
- January 1 – The Lichfield rail crash in England kills 20 people.
- January 18 – The Harvey Girls, a movie starring Judy Garland and Ray Bolger and set in a Harvey House Hotel, makes its American debut. The movie will win a Best Song Oscar for Johnny Mercer’s “On the Atchison, Topeka and the Santa Fe”.
- January 21 – The Hull Electric Railway in Ottawa is fined $50 for violating a local law against moving freight on the city streets between midnight and 5:00 AM when it was delivering loads to oil companies along Laurier Avenue.

=== February events ===
- February 1 – Henry G. Ivatt is promoted to Chief Mechanical Engineer of the London, Midland and Scottish Railway, succeeding Charles Fairburn.
- February 20 – Pullman Standard delivers the first passenger car built after World War II.
- February 25 – The worst-ever train crash in Japan kills 184 people.

=== March events ===
- March 29 – The north end of Ottawa's Interprovincial Bridge is destroyed by fire, severing Château Laurier from Hull Electric Railway passenger service.

=== April events ===
- April 5 – The Temiskaming and Northern Ontario Railway Act is amended by the Ontario government, to change the name of the Temiskaming and Northern Ontario Railway to the Ontario Northland Railway.
- April 25 – Naperville train disaster in Naperville, Illinois, United States: Chicago, Burlington and Quincy Railroad's Advance Flyer, stopped in the station, is rammed by the railroad's Exposition Flyer. 45 killed, more than 100 injured.

=== May events ===
- May 17 – President Harry Truman seizes control of the railroads to prevent a nationwide strike.
- May 30 – After a short strike earlier in the month, Hudson and Manhattan Railroad trainmen go on strike again when the Pennsylvania Railroad (which owned the H&M at this time) management decides that the recent PRR pay increase does not apply to H&M employees.

=== June events ===
- June 20 – First use of a Public Address system on a passenger train for station announcements. The system was installed in a New York City Subway car.

=== July events ===
- July – General Motors Electro-Motive Division introduces the EMD F2.
- July 1 – Opening of replacement Hawkesbury River Railway Bridge north of Sydney, Australia.

=== August events ===
- August 10 – The Pere Marquette Railway inaugurates the Pere Marquette passenger train between Detroit and Grand Rapids, Michigan, the first new postwar streamliner.
- August 14 – Fréjus Rail Tunnel reopened as reconstructed after wartime closure (first public train September 11).
- August 24 – The Boston and Maine Railroad replaces electric locomotive operation through the Hoosac Tunnel with diesel locomotives.
- August 27 – The last T1 class steam locomotive built by Baldwin Locomotive Works for the Pennsylvania Railroad enters service.

=== September events ===
- September – The first production ALCO PA diesel-electric units are delivered for the Atchison, Topeka and Santa Fe Railway in the United States.
- September 29 – The Illinois Central Railroad fully dieselized all passenger trains that it is operating between Chicago, Illinois, and St. Louis, Missouri.

=== December events ===
- December 7 – The power car from the M-10002 streamliner trainset is sold to Northrup-Hendy for gas turbine train testing.
- December 8 – General Motors Electro-Motive Division introduces the EMD NW5.
- December 20 – Libyan section of Western Desert Extension Railway closed.
- December 23 – 8,872,244 ride the New York City Subway system, the current one-day record.

=== Unknown date events ===
- Vulcan Foundry of Newton-le-Willows, England, construct 120 Liberation Class 2-8-0 steam locomotives to British Ministry of Supply order for the United Nations Relief and Rehabilitation Administration to supply to Eastern Europe.
- United States builders construct 160 KD7 Class 2-8-0 steam locomotives for the UNRRA to supply to China Railway; a similar design is supplied as Class 29 to Belgian Railways.
- General Electric builds the electric locomotive model that will soon become known as the Little Joe.
- André Chapelon’s 4-8-4 SNCF 242A1 prototype compound locomotive is completed in France; it goes on to achieve extraordinary power outputs and efficiencies in coal and water use.
- John W. Barriger III becomes president of the Monon Railroad.
- The Atlanta, Birmingham and Coast Railroad is merged into the Atlantic Coast Line.
- The Chesapeake and Ohio Railway, under the direction of Robert R. Young, places the largest single passenger car order with Pullman-Standard for nearly 300 cars. These cars entered service beginning in 1950.

== Deaths ==
=== March deaths ===
- March 21 – Oliver Bury, Chief mechanical engineer and manager of Great Western Railway of Brazil 1892–1894, general manager of the Great Northern Railway in England 1902–1912, Director of the GNR and London and North Eastern Railway 1912–1945 (born 1861).

=== November deaths ===
- November 10 – Patrick H. Joyce, president of Chicago Great Western Railway 1931–1946 (born 1879).

== Sources ==
- Monon Railroad Historical and Technical Society (2004), History of the Monon. Retrieved February 9, 2005.
- Rivanna Chapter National Railway Historical Society (2005), This month in railroad history – August. Retrieved August 23, 2005.
