= 1938 in rail transport =

This article lists events related to rail transport that occurred in 1938.

== Events ==
=== January ===
- January 1 – Creation of the following European railway networks under government control:
  - SNCF (Société Nationale des Chemins de fer Français), bringing the principal railway companies of France together.
  - NS (Nederlandsche Spoorwegen), merging the Hollandsche IJzeren Spoorweg-Maatschappij (HSM) and the Maatschappij tot Exploitatie van Staatsspoorwegen (SS) in the Netherlands.
- January 22 – The Pacific Electric Whittier Line is truncated to Walker.

=== February ===
- February 22 – The Atchison, Topeka and Santa Fe Railway introduces the El Capitan passenger train between Chicago and Los Angeles.
- February 26 – A second all-lightweight trainset enters service on the Super Chief.

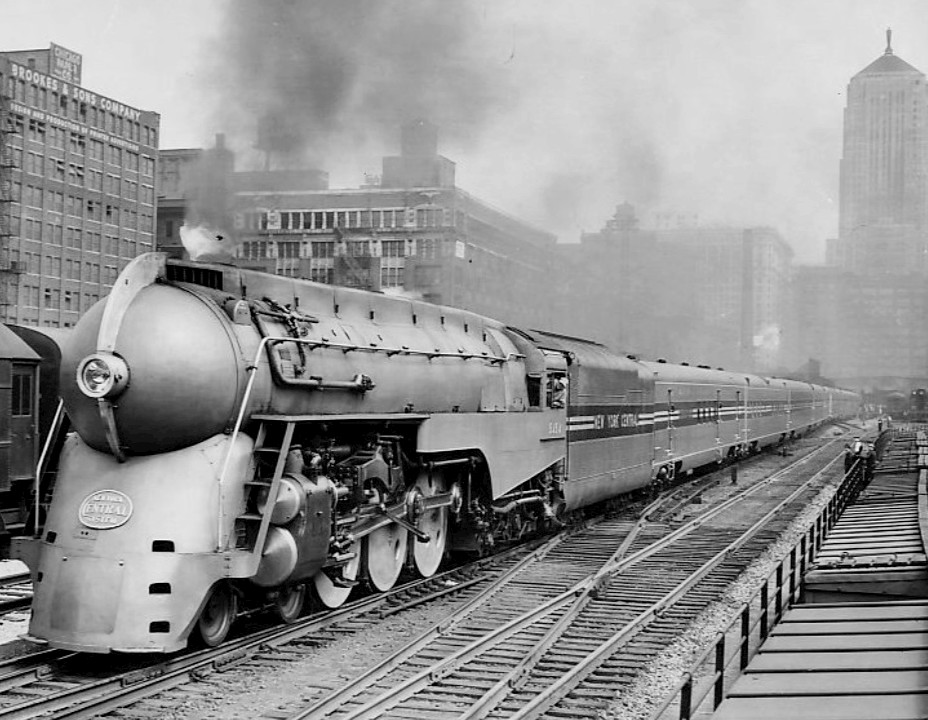
Streamlined 20th Century Limited departs Chicago, 1938

=== March ===
- March 6 – The Pacific Electric Walker Line is discontinued.
- March 18 – Bundesbahn Österreich (BBÖ, Federal Railway of Austria) integrated into Deutsche Reichsbahn.
- March 27 – Atchison, Topeka and Santa Fe Railway inaugurates the San Diegan passenger train between Los Angeles and San Diego.

=== May ===
- May 8 — President Manuel L. Quezon inaugurates regular services on the Main Line South of the Manila Railroad in Del Gallego, Camarines Sur. Trial runs already began five months prior.
- May 15
  - The Lake Shore Electric Railway in Ohio ceases operations.
  - Inauguration of a major Nederlandse Spoorwegen electrification scheme in the central Netherlands, centred on Utrecht.

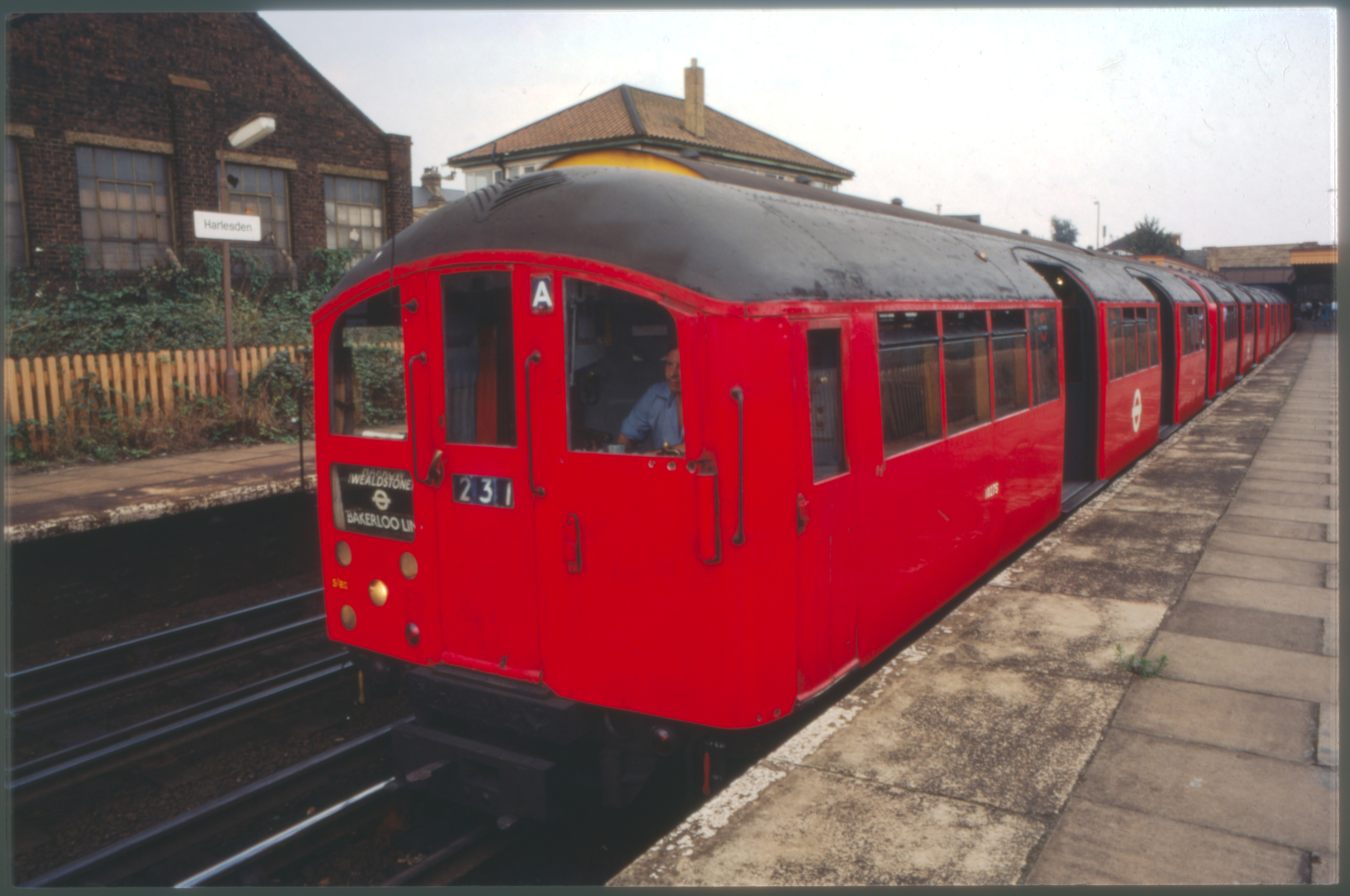
London Underground 1938 Stock

=== June ===
- June 1 – Pacific Electric's Owensmouth Line and San Fernando Line are truncated to Sherman Way.
- June 15 – New York Central Railroad introduces an all-streamlined consist on the 20th Century Limited and also introduces the New England States passenger train between Chicago and Boston.
- June 16 – The Pike's Peak Cog Railway in Colorado operates gasoline-powered railcar number 7, the first rack railcar in the world, for the first time.
- June 19 – Custer Creek train wreck kills at least 47 near Saugus, Montana. A bridge, weakened by a flash flood, collapses under the Milwaukee Road's Olympian plunging the locomotive and seven lead cars into the rain-swollen creek. It remains the worse rail disaster in Montana history.
- June 30 – London Underground 1938 Stock enters public service, on Northern line.

=== July ===
- July 3 – The London and North Eastern Railway 4-6-2 Mallard reaches a speed of 126 mph (203 km/h), the highest certified speed for a steam locomotive.

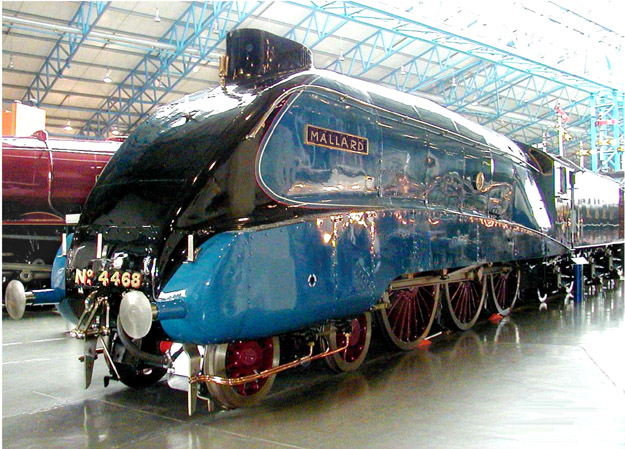
LNER No. 4468 Mallard as running in 1938

- July 31 – The Pennsylvania Railroad, in its public timetable issued today, boasts that “19% of all passengers are carried on the Pennsylvania Railroad.”

=== October ===
- October – Electro-Motive Corporation introduces the EMC E4.

=== November ===
- November 1 – Passenger service ends on the Maine narrow gauge Monson Railroad.

=== December ===
- December 13 – The Reading Railroad's Crusader passenger train is introduced.
- December 15
  - The first diesel locomotives in the southeast United States, EMC E4s, appear on the Orange Blossom Special.
  - The second section of the Itō Line, connecting Ajiro to Itō in Japan, opens.
- December 23 – Jean Renoir's film of La Bête Humaine released in France.

=== Unknown date ===
- Pennsylvania Railroad's Broadway Limited is completely re-equipped based on an industrial design by Raymond Loewy.
- Overhead wire on the Pennsylvania Railroad's mainline from New York City reaches Harrisburg, Pennsylvania.
- Overhead wire on the newly formed SNCF system between Tours and Bordeaux in France completes electrification from Paris to the Spanish frontier.
- The first passenger car equipped with fluorescent lights is operated on the New York Central Railroad.

== Births ==
=== January births ===
- January 11 – Alastair Morton, chief executive of Eurotunnel 1987–1996, chairman of British Strategic Rail Authority 1999-2001 (d. 2004).

=== Unknown date births ===
- John H. Kuehl, editor of Private Varnish magazine, passenger car historian and photographer (died 2005).

== Deaths ==
=== February deaths ===
- February 2 – Frederick William Vanderbilt, director of the New York Central system (born 1856).
- February 9 – Arturo Caprotti, Italian inventor of Caprotti valve gear for steam locomotives (born 1881).

=== October deaths ===
- October 16 – Sir Henry Fowler, Chief Mechanical Engineer of the Midland Railway 1909–1923 and the London, Midland and Scottish Railway 1925–1931 (born 1870).

=== December deaths ===
- December 1 – David Blyth Hanna, first president of Canadian National Railway (born 1858).
