= Railway Association of Canada =

Firm founded in 1917 to coordinate railway activities in World War I

- Association des chemins de fer du Canada
- Abbreviation: RAC / ACFC
- Formation: October 23, 1917; 109 years ago
- Legal status: active
- Purpose: advocates for freight, commuter, tourist and intercity railways provides professional services
- Headquarters: Ottawa, Canada
- Official language: English, French
- President and Chief Executive Officer: Marc Brazeau
- Board of directors: Brian Cornick; Chad Evans; Gerald Linden; Janet Drysdale; Jeff Ellis; Mario Péloquin; Nathan Cato; Olivier Chouc; Phil Verster; Rick McLellan
- Website: www.railcan.ca
- Formerly called: Canadian Railway War Board

Railway Association of Canada logo

The Railway Association of Canada (French: Association des chemins de fer du Canada, RAC) was founded in 1917 as the Canadian Railway War Board in order to coordinate railway activities during World War I. The first meeting of the organization was held on October 23, 1917, and the name was changed to Railway Association of Canada in 1919. Among its initiatives is the Canadian Railway Hall of Fame. It is headquartered in Ottawa and represents around 50 member railways.
