= 1861 in rail transport =

This article lists events related to rail transport that occurred in 1861.

== Events ==
=== February events ===
- February 22 – Passenger service began on Strasburg Rail Road with a visit from Abraham Lincoln.

=== April events ===
- April 1 – Budapest Déli station opens as the Buda terminal of the line to Fiume.
- April – Nathaniel Marsh succeeds Samuel Marsh as president of the Erie Railroad.

=== May events ===
- May 13 – Line opened between Karachi and Kochi (169 km (105 mi)) on 5 ft 6in (1676 mm) gauge, the first railway in modern-day Pakistan.

"Locomotives Dismantled By the Rebels at Martinsburg, Virginia" in Harper's Weekly August 1861

- May 24 – The Great Train Raid of 1861 is conducted by Stonewall Jackson.

=== June events ===
- June 16 – Battle of Vienna, Virginia, is the first time in history a railroad is used tactically in battle.
- June – Opening of first section of rail line in Paraguay, under the auspices of Presidente Carlos Antonio López, with mainly British engineering, 4 km (2.5 mi) from Asunción to Trinidad on the Iberian gauge of 1,672 mm (5 ft 5 13/16 in). Regular services to Paraguarí begin on September 21 and on December 25 the line is extended to the city of Luque.

=== July events ===
- July 21 – Railroad transport of Confederate States of America troops delivers decisive reinforcements providing victory in the First Battle of Bull Run.

=== August events ===
- August 6 – An Act is passed to authorize the construction of the Blane Valley Railway in Scotland.

=== September events ===
- September 4 – The Staten Island Railway is placed into receivership with William Henry Vanderbilt as receiver.

=== December events ===
- December 25 – Opening of first rail line in Latvia, between Riga and Dinaburg (Daugavpils), 230 km (140 mi) on the Imperial Russian gauge of 1,524 mm (5 ft).

=== Unknown date events ===
- Jean-Jacques Meyer patents the Meyer locomotive.
- Jackson and Woodin Manufacturing Company in Berwick, Pennsylvania, later to become part of American Car and Foundry, begins manufacturing railroad infrastructure parts.

== Births ==
=== January births ===
- January 28 – Daniel Willard, president of Baltimore and Ohio Railroad 1910–1941 (d. 1942).

=== April births ===
- April 26 – Zhan Tianyou, Chief Engineer responsible for construction of the Imperial Peking-Kalgan Railway, the first railway constructed in China without foreign assistance (d. 1919).

=== June births ===
- June 8 – Karl Gölsdorf, Austrian steam locomotive designer (d. 1916).

=== November births ===
- November 2 - Oliver Robert Hawke Bury, Chief mechanical engineer and manager of Great Western Railway of Brazil 1892–1894, general manager of the Great Northern Railway (GNR) in England 1902–1912, Director of the GNR 1912–22 and of the London and North Eastern Railway 1923–1945 (d. 1946).

== Deaths ==
=== October deaths ===
- October 13 – Sir William Cubitt, civil engineer on the South Eastern and Great Northern Railways of England (d. 1861).
