= 1852 in rail transport =

This article lists events related to rail transport that occurred in 1852.

== Events ==
=== March events ===
- March – With French government support, the Compagnie du chemin de fer de Paris à Orléans absorbs the Compagnie du Centre; the Compagnie du chemin de fer de Tours à Nantes; and the Compagnie du chemin de fer d'Orléans à Bordeaux.

=== June events ===
- June 17 – The Somerset Central Railway in England is authorized.

=== July events ===
- July 19 – Isambard Kingdom Brunel's Chepstow Railway Bridge is opened to traffic, completing the South Wales Railway throughout from Gloucester (England) to Swansea.

=== October events ===
- October 1 – The Great Western Railway's Birmingham and Oxford Junction Railway in England is completed throughout from Banbury to Birmingham Snow Hill as a dual gauge line.
- October 10 – The first revenue trains operate over the Chicago & Rock Island Railroad, an early predecessor of the Chicago, Rock Island and Pacific Railroad, between Chicago and Joliet, Illinois.

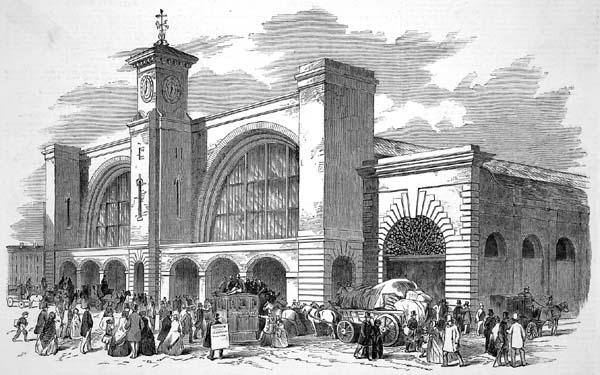
King's Cross station as built

- October 14 – Opening of London King's Cross station by the Great Northern Railway (Great Britain).

=== November events ===
- November 10 – The Grand Trunk Railway Company is incorporated in Canada to build a railway between Toronto and Montreal.
- November 20 – The Lake Shore and Michigan Southern Railway line between Erie, Pennsylvania, and Cleveland, Ohio, opens.

=== December events ===
- December 11 – Wilhelm Engerth patents the Engerth locomotive, an early articulated locomotive.
- December 12 – First section of Chemin de fer de Petite Ceinture concession in Paris opens.

=== Unknown date events ===
- Paris–Bordeaux railway in France opens from Bordeaux to Angoulême.
- John Cooke steps down from the superintendent position at Rogers Locomotive and Machine Works to partner with Charles Danforth in forming the new locomotive manufacturing company, Danforth, Cooke and Company in Paterson, New Jersey.
- The first 2-6-0 steam locomotives are built.
- Great Southern and Western Railway of Ireland builds first locomotive at its Inchicore Works, Dublin.
- John Edgar Thomson becomes president of the Pennsylvania Railroad.

== Births ==
=== August events ===
- August 16 – Charles Sanger Mellen, president of Northern Pacific Railway 1897–1903 and New Haven Railroad beginning in 1903 (d. 1927).

=== Unknown date births ===
- J. Elfreth Watkins, railroad civil engineer and first curator for the Smithsonian Institution's railroad artifacts including John Bull.
