= 1851 in rail transport =

This article lists events related to rail transport that occurred in 1851.

== Events ==
=== February events ===
- February 4 – The Cincinnati, Wilmington and Zanesville Railroad is incorporated in Ohio.
- February 7 – The Chicago & Rock Island Railroad, the earliest predecessor of the Chicago, Rock Island and Pacific Railroad, is incorporated.
- February 10 – The Illinois Central Railroad is chartered.
- February 25 – The first passenger train on the Milwaukee Road operates over what is then known as the Milwaukee and Mississippi Railroad between Milwaukee, Wisconsin, and Wauwatosa, Wisconsin.

=== April events ===
- April 19 – The Albany and Susquehanna Railroad, in New York state, is chartered.

=== May events ===
- May 17 – Opening of first railway in Peru, linking the Pacific port of Callao and the capital Lima (13.7 km (8.5 mi) of standard gauge), later part of the Ferrocarril del Centro.

=== June events ===
- June – The first "refrigerated boxcar" enters service on the Northern Railroad (New York).

=== July events ===
- July 4 – Groundbreaking ceremonies are held for the Pacific Railroad Company, a railroad later to become the Missouri Pacific Railroad

=== August events ===
- August 2 – The Staten Island Railway is incorporated.

=== November events ===
- November 1 – Saint Petersburg–Moscow Railway officially opened in Russia.

=== December events ===
- December 22 – The first railway operates in India, hauling construction material in Roorkee.
- December 25 – Opening of first railway in Chile, from Caldera to Copiapó (80.5 km (50.0 mi) of standard gauge climbing (396 m (1,299 ft)).

=== Unknown date events ===
- The oldest line to become a part of the Southern Pacific Railroad system, the Buffalo Bayou, Brazos and Colorado Railway begins construction between Houston, Texas, and Alleyton, Texas.
- The Mohawk and Hudson Railroad changes its name to the Mohawk Valley Railroad.

== Births ==
=== March births ===
- March 1 – Edward Ponsonby, director for London, Brighton and South Coast Railway beginning in 1895 and chairman of same 1908–1920 (died 1920).

=== June births ===
- June 24 – Stuyvesant Fish, president of the Illinois Central Railroad 1887–1907 (died 1923).

=== September births ===
- September 16 – Henry Ivatt, Chief Mechanical Engineer of the Great Northern Railway (Great Britain) 1896–1911 (died 1923).

=== October births ===
- October 5 – Frank W. Arnold, a Grand Master and Secretary-Treasurer of the Brotherhood of Locomotive Firemen, is born (died 1917).
