= Arrondissement of Sarrebourg =

Coordinates: 48.73°N 7.05°E

Sarrebourg
- Former arrondissement
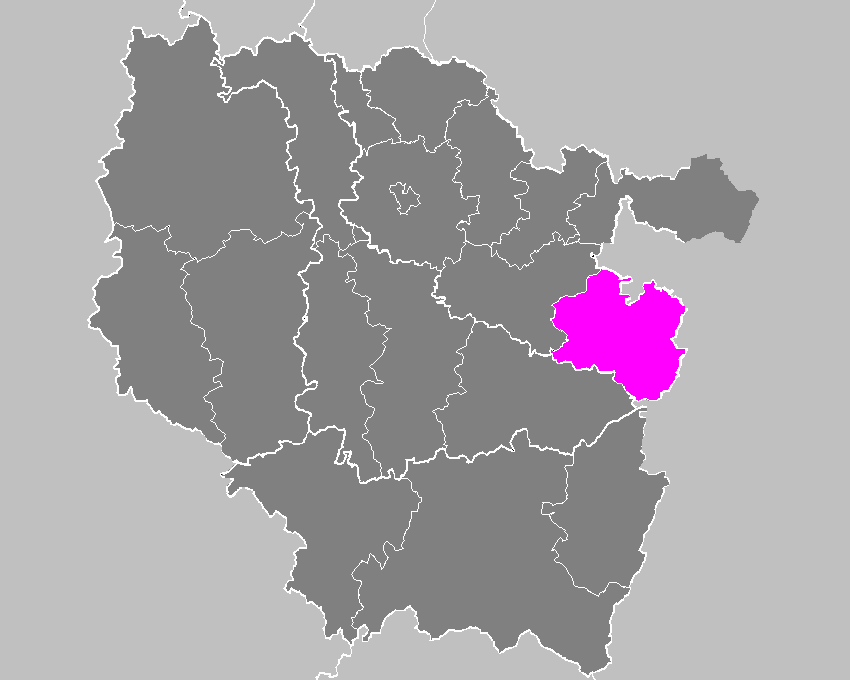
- Location within the former region Lorraine
- Country: France
- Region: Grand Est
- Department: Moselle
- No. of communes: {{{nbcomm}}}
- Disbanded: 2016
- Area: 993 km^{2} (383 sq mi)
- Population (2012): 64,374
  - Density: 64.8/km^{2} (168/sq mi)

The arrondissement of Sarrebourg is a former arrondissement of France in the Moselle department in the Lorraine region. In January 2016 it was merged into the new arrondissement of Sarrebourg-Château-Salins. It had 102 communes, and its population was 64,374 (2012).

== Composition ==
The communes of the arrondissement of Sarrebourg, and their INSEE codes, were:

| 1. Abreschviller (57003) | 2. Arzviller (57033) | 3. Aspach (57034) | 4. Assenoncourt (57035) |
| 5. Avricourt (57042) | 6. Azoudange (57044) | 7. Barchain (57050) | 8. Belles-Forêts (57086) |
| 9. Berling (57064) | 10. Berthelming (57066) | 11. Bettborn (57071) | 12. Bickenholtz (57080) |
| 13. Bourscheid (57100) | 14. Brouderdorff (57113) | 15. Brouviller (57114) | 16. Buhl-Lorraine (57119) |
| 17. Bébing (57056) | 18. Dabo (57163) | 19. Danne-et-Quatre-Vents (57168) | 20. Dannelbourg (57169) |
| 21. Desseling (57173) | 22. Diane-Capelle (57175) | 23. Dolving (57180) | 24. Fleisheim (57216) |
| 25. Foulcrey (57229) | 26. Fraquelfing (57233) | 27. Fribourg (57241) | 28. Fénétrange (57210) |
| 29. Garrebourg (57244) | 30. Gondrexange (57253) | 31. Gosselming (57255) | 32. Guermange (57272) |
| 33. Guntzviller (57280) | 34. Hangviller (57291) | 35. Harreberg (57298) | 36. Hartzviller (57299) |
| 37. Haselbourg (57300) | 38. Hattigny (57302) | 39. Haut-Clocher (57304) | 40. Hellering-lès-Fénétrange (57310) |
| 41. Henridorff (57315) | 42. Hermelange (57318) | 43. Hertzing (57320) | 44. Hesse (57321) |
| 45. Hilbesheim (57324) | 46. Hommarting (57333) | 47. Hommert (57334) | 48. Hultehouse (57339) |
| 49. Héming (57314) | 50. Hérange (57317) | 51. Ibigny (57342) | 52. Imling (57344) |
| 53. Kerprich-aux-Bois (57362) | 54. Lafrimbolle (57374) | 55. Landange (57377) | 56. Laneuveville-lès-Lorquin (57380) |
| 57. Langatte (57382) | 58. Languimberg (57383) | 59. Lixheim (57407) | 60. Lorquin (57414) |
| 61. Lutzelbourg (57427) | 62. Metting (57462) | 63. Mittelbronn (57468) | 64. Mittersheim (57469) |
| 65. Moussey (57488) | 66. Métairies-Saint-Quirin (57461) | 67. Neufmoulins (57500) | 68. Niderhoff (57504) |
| 69. Niderviller (57505) | 70. Niederstinzel (57506) | 71. Nitting (57509) | 72. Oberstinzel (57518) |
| 73. Phalsbourg (57540) | 74. Plaine-de-Walsch (57544) | 75. Postroff (57551) | 76. Rhodes (57579) |
| 77. Richeval (57583) | 78. Romelfing (57592) | 79. Réchicourt-le-Château (57564) | 80. Réding (57566) |
| 81. Saint-Georges (57611) | 82. Saint-Jean-Kourtzerode (57614) | 83. Saint-Jean-de-Bassel (57613) | 84. Saint-Louis (57618) |
| 85. Saint-Quirin (57623) | 86. Sarraltroff (57629) | 87. Sarrebourg (57630) | 88. Schalbach (57635) |
| 89. Schneckenbusch (57637) | 90. Troisfontaines (57680) | 91. Turquestein-Blancrupt (57682) | 92. Vasperviller (57697) |
| 93. Veckersviller (57703) | 94. Vescheim (57709) | 95. Vieux-Lixheim (57713) | 96. Vilsberg (57721) |
| 97. Voyer (57734) | 98. Walscheid (57742) | 99. Waltembourg (57743) | 100. Wintersbourg (57747) |
| 101. Xouaxange (57756) | 102. Zilling (57761) | | |

== History ==
The arrondissement of Sarrebourg was created as part of the department Meurthe in 1800. In 1871 it was disbanded (ceded to Germany). It was restored in 1919 as part of the department Moselle. It was disbanded in 2016. As a result of the reorganisation of the cantons of France which came into effect in 2015, the borders of the cantons are no longer related to the borders of the arrondissements. The cantons of the arrondissement of Sarrebourg were, as of January 2015:

1. Fénétrange
2. Lorquin
3. Phalsbourg
4. Réchicourt-le-Château
5. Sarrebourg
