= Sarraltroff =

- Commune
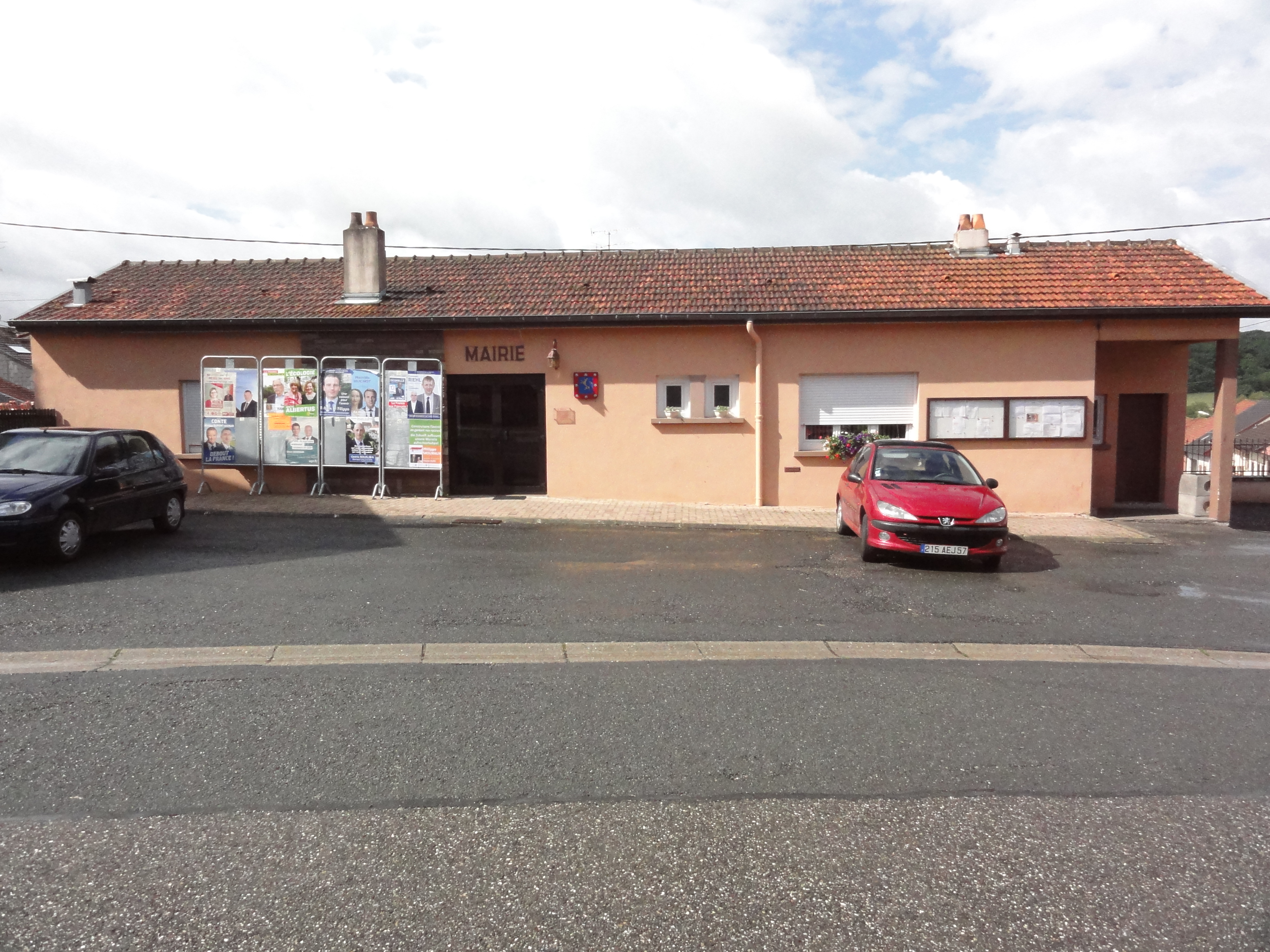
- The town hall in Sarraltroff

- Coat of arms
- Location of Sarraltroff
- Location within France Location within Grand Est
- Coordinates: 48°46′29″N 7°03′49″E
- Country: France
- Region: Grand Est
- Department: Moselle
- Arrondissement: Sarrebourg-Château-Salins
- Canton: Sarrebourg
- Intercommunality: CC Sarrebourg Moselle Sud

Government
  - Mayor (2020–2026): Francis Mathis
- Area^{1}: 11.97 km^{2} (4.62 sq mi)
- Elevation: 260 m (850 ft)
- Highest elevation: 326 m (1,070 ft)
- Lowest elevation: 235 m (771 ft)
- Population (2023): 789
  - Density: 65.9/km^{2} (171/sq mi)
- Time zone: UTC+01:00 (CET)
  - Summer (DST): UTC+02:00 (CEST)
- INSEE/Postal code: 57629 /57400
- ^{1} French Land Register data, which excludes lakes, ponds, glaciers > 1 km^{2} (0.386 sq mi or 247 acres) and river estuaries.

Sarraltroff (French pronunciation: [saʁaltʁɔf]; German: Saaraltdorf) is a commune in the Moselle department in Grand Est in north-eastern France.

== Geography ==
Sarraltroff is located near the border with the Bas-Rhin department.

The territory of the municipality borders on those of 6 municipalities : Gœrlingen, Hilbesheim, Sarrebourg, Dolving, Oberstinzel et Hellering-lès-Fénétrange.

== History ==
At the time of the Duchy of Lorraine, the village was part of the seigneury of Sarreck. It belonged to a large, forgotten area named Westrich, which Albert Eiselé called "ghost country" because its name has been forgotten.

In 1225 Gertrude de Dabo died without an heir. The bishoprics of Metz and Strasbourg took back their fief and Sarreck then became the property of La Petite-Pierre and then the Lutzelbourgs.

The Thirty Years War did not spare Sarraltroff. It is probably the troops of Bernard of Saxe-Weimar who destroyed the village after the siege of Sarrebourg.

== See also ==
- Communes of the Moselle department
