= Saint-Louis-Arzviller inclined plane =

Canal inclined plane in Moselle, France

Coordinates: 48°42′57″N 007°13′06″E

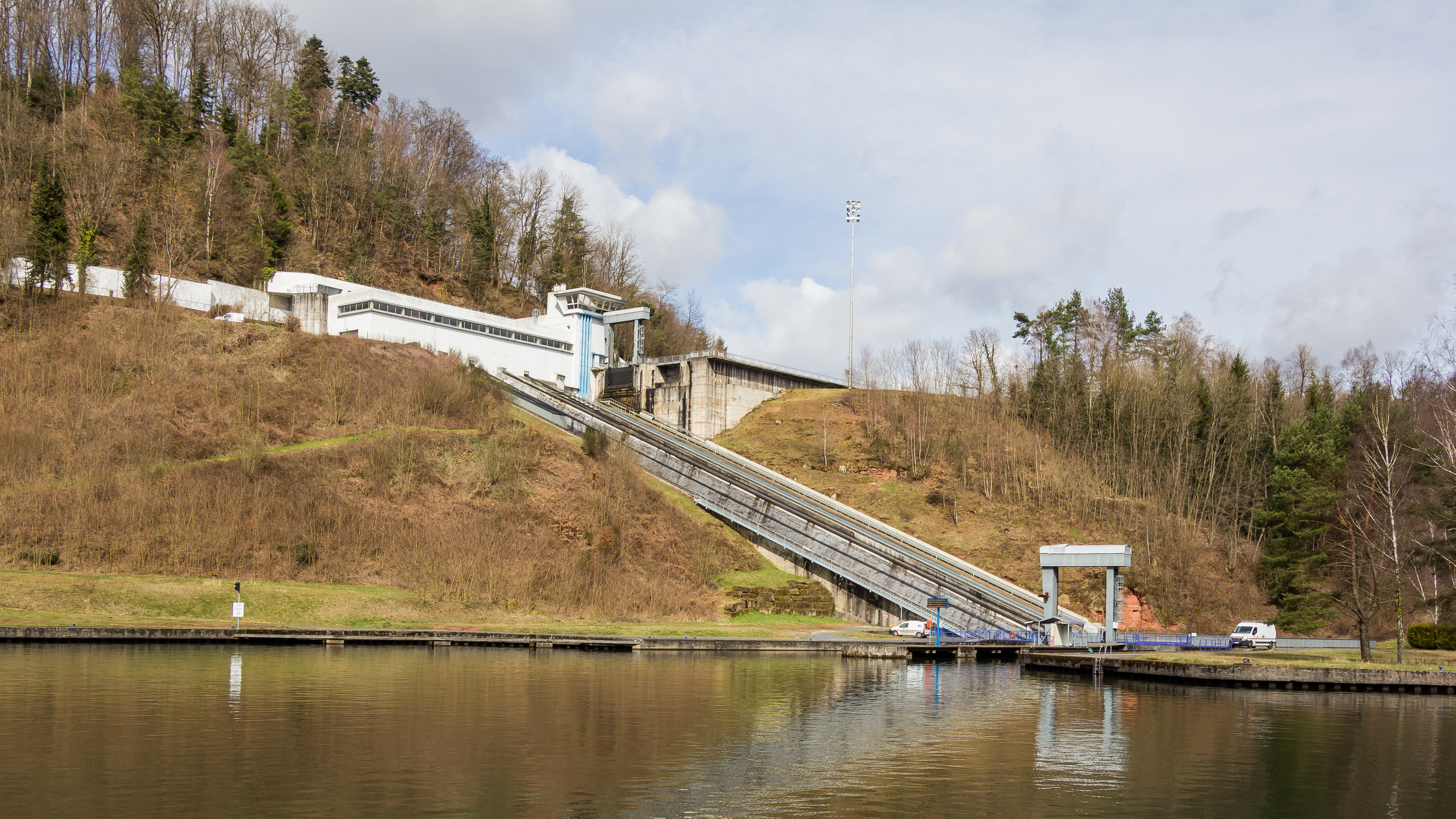
- The Saint-Louis-Arzviller inclined plane.

History
- Built in: 1969
- Location: Commune of Saint-Louis, between the towns of Saint-Louis and Arzviller

Dimensions
- Moves horizontally: 108.6 m (356 ft)
- Moves vertically: 44.55 m (146.2 ft)
- Track length: 136 m (446 ft)
- Inclination: 1:2.44
- Maximum speed: 0.6 m/s after 12 m
- Travel time: 4 minutes
- Complete time: less than 20 minutes
- Constructed of: Reinforced concrete with steel rails
- The Casson: 41.5 m long, 5.5 m wide, water depth 3.2 m deep, riding on 32 wheels.
- Powered by: two winches, each driven by a 100 kW electrical motors
- Counterweights: two concrete counterweights, 450 tonnes each.

The Saint-Louis-Arzviller inclined plane is an inclined plane on the Marne-Rhine Canal (French: Canal de la Marne au Rhin) that enables the canal to cross the Vosges Mountains. It is located in the commune of Saint-Louis, between the towns of Saint-Louis and Arzviller in the département of the Moselle.

== History ==
The Marne-Rhine Canal was built from 1838 to 1853. The main problem it solved was going through the Vosges Mountains and especially climbing up its eastern side to its lower point, the Col de Saverne. This was first solved by means of a ladder of seventeen locks, allowing an overall level change of 44.55 metres over a distance of 4 kilometres. In 1969, these locks were replaced by the Saint-Louis-Arzviller inclined plane.

Before the advent of self-propelled barges, the barges were hauled by two to four horses or mules, until the beginning of the 20th century. Then came the tractors, first on railways then on tyres since 1933, with electrical motors first and later diesel engines.

The greatest energy is needed to start the move. Thus, the traveling via the locks ladder was very laborious, tiring, expensive and long.

With 314 kilometres, the travel from Vitry-le-François to Strasbourg took six to nine days. Just using the locks ladder of Arzviller with its 17 locks needed one whole day.

Additionally, due to the narrow width of this section, the crossing of two barges was barely possible.

One person was needed to man each lock. These seventeen lock-keepers had to take care of the locks seven days a week and about twelve hours a day. They lived near the canal in houses owned by the state. Their duty was:

- to allow the boats to pass through the locks;
- to ensure good functioning and safety;
- to maintain the valves, the toothed racks and the canal's surroundings.

In winter, the canal was emptied, to allow the locks' upkeep.

The seventeen locks wasted a lot of water (about 600 cubic metres per boat and per lock plus the leaks). In summer, the water need was greater than could be compensated for by the surrounding available small river and ponds.

== The solution ==
Several projects resulting from an international contest had been successively studied and rejected, because some of the systems that were presented, in particular those of longitudinal type - such as the Ronquières in Belgium (1967) – were badly suited to the Vosgean site. The transverse system was the one best adapted to the topography of the site and also enabled the section of the old canal to be kept in service, limiting considerable cuts in navigation time. The only work of this type existing at the time was the Foxton inclined plane of Foxton, Leicestershire (1900).

The new structure opened in 1969.

=== Principle ===
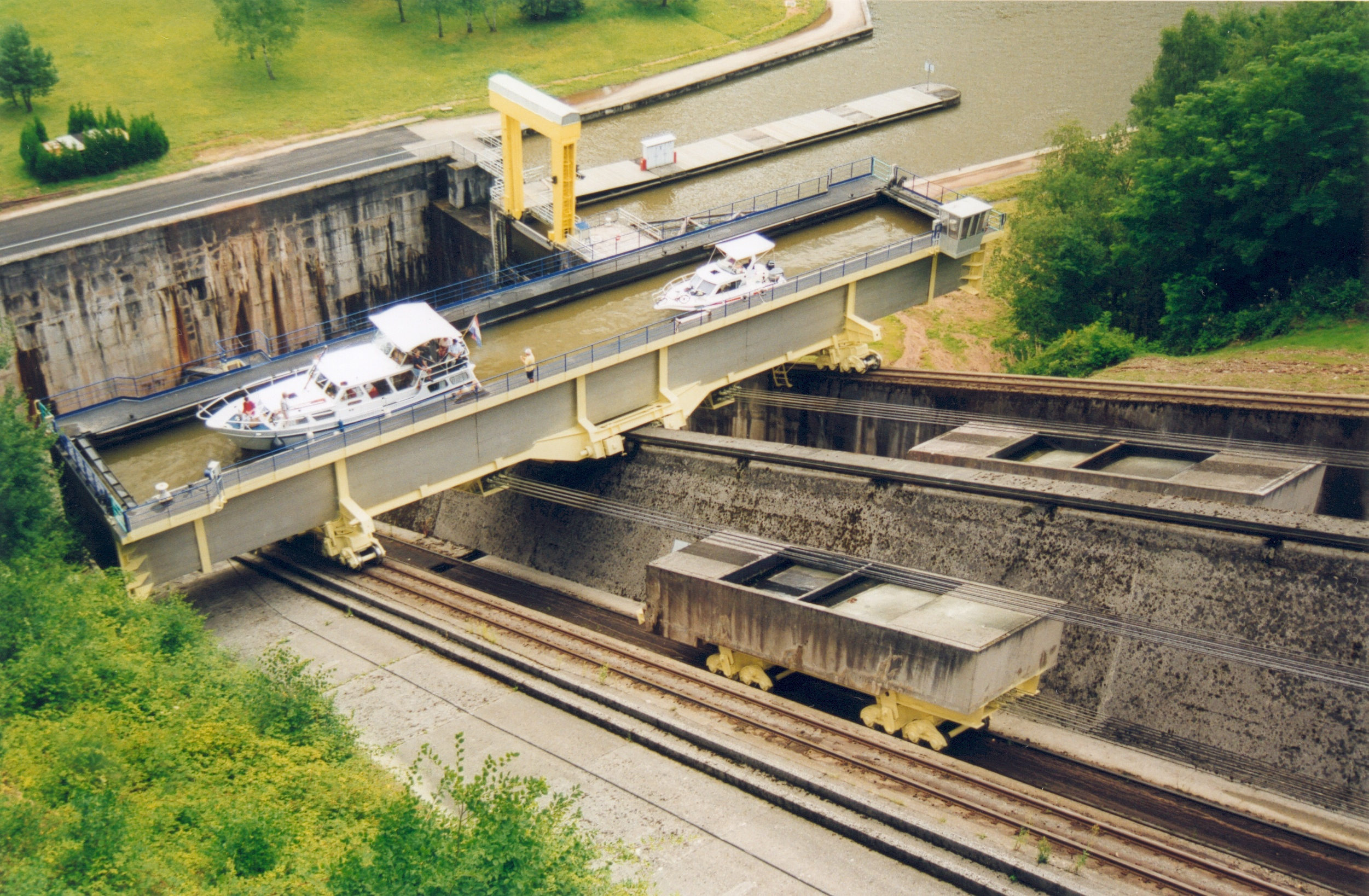
View from above

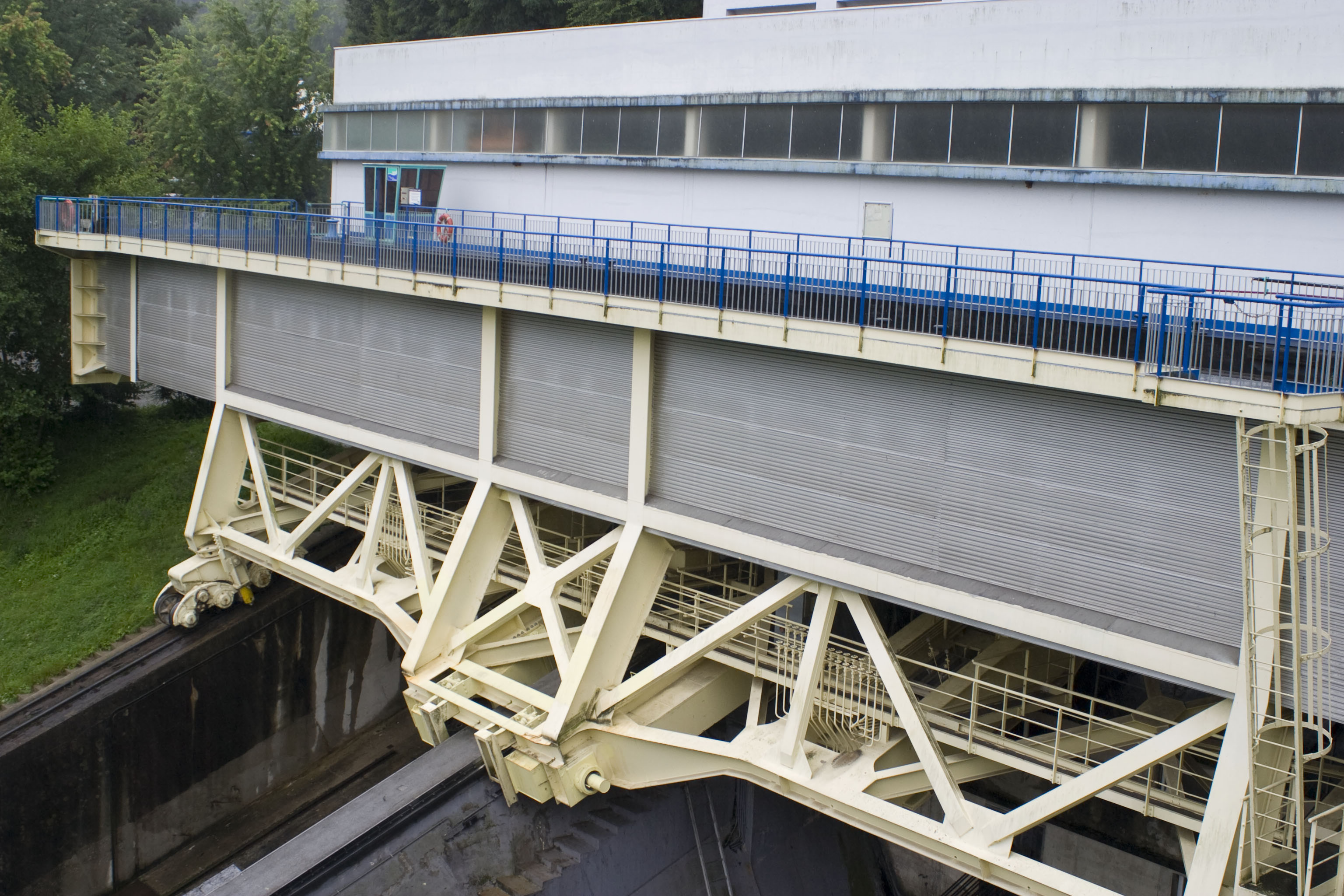
The caisson

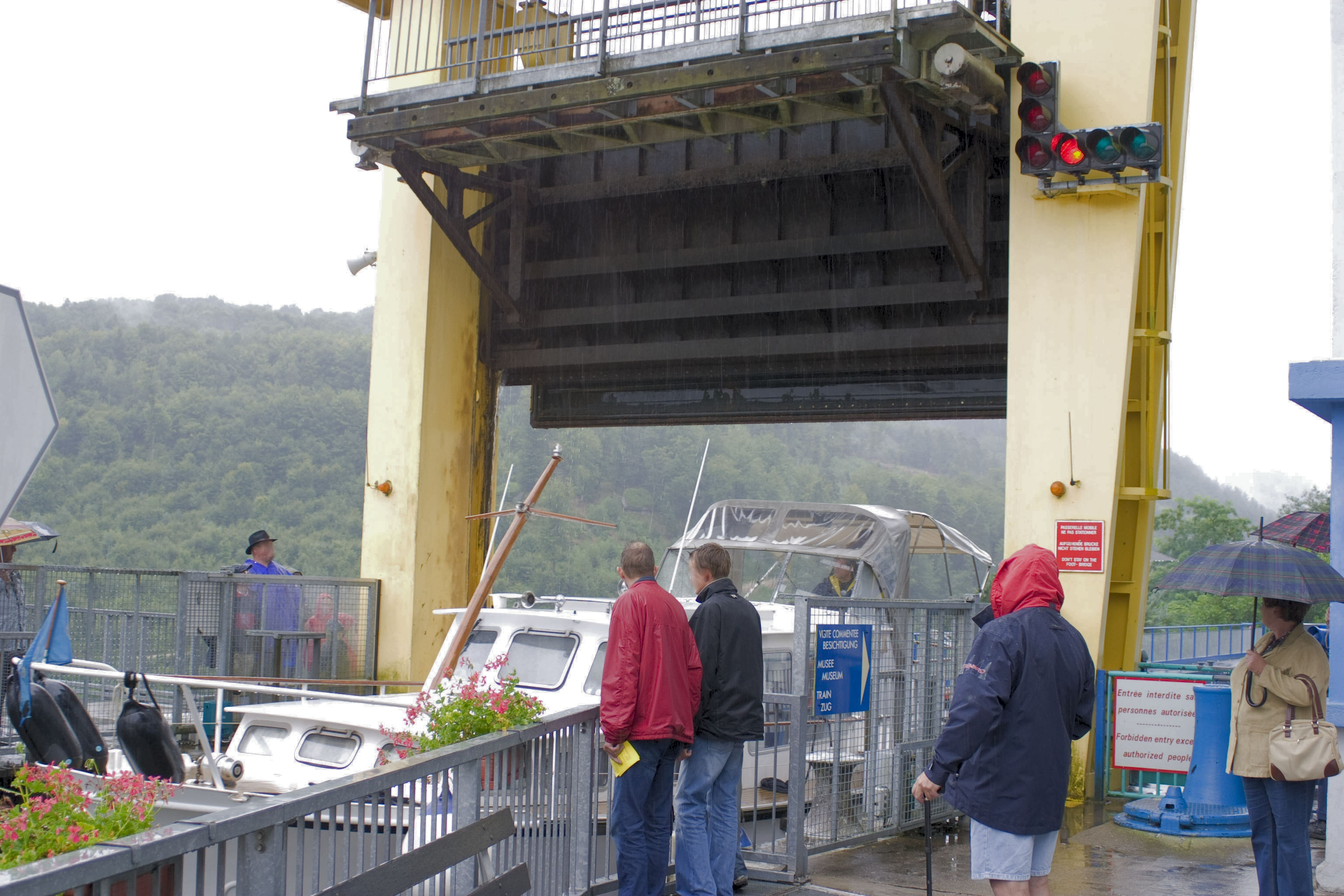
The lifting gates

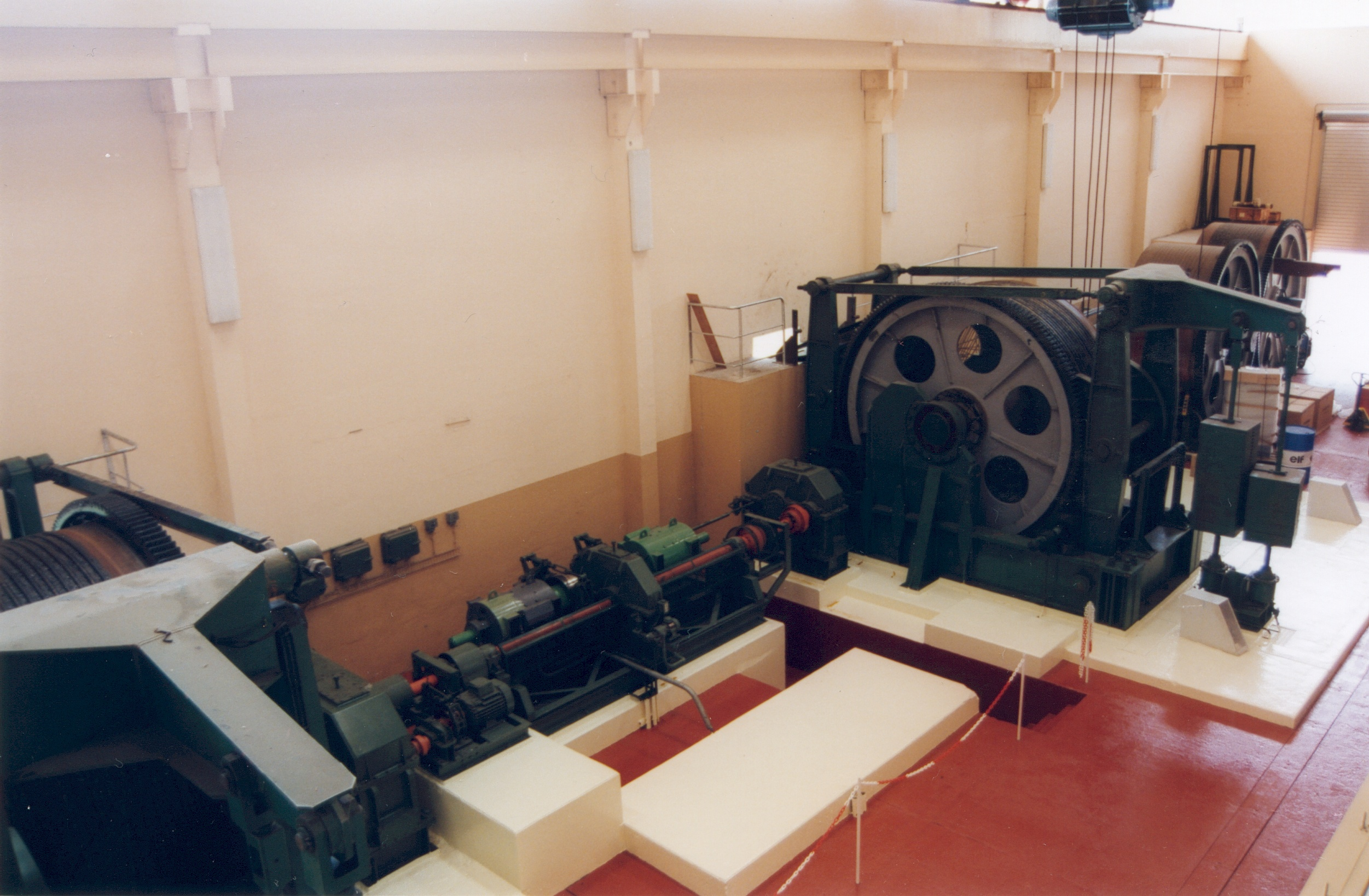
The machine room

The system works by basically lifting or lowering a caisson containing a boat on a carriage along a slope using a balancing counterweight.

According to Archimedes' principle, the barge which enters the caisson drives back towards the canal a quantity of water equivalent to the mass of the barge. Thus the weight of the caisson stays the same when a barge is moving into it or leaving it.

In principle, the system could function without an engine. Indeed, the caisson is more full at the upper level, because it stops 20 cm below the level of the canal, and less full at the lower level, since it stops 20 cm above the canal. The engines control only the speed, and require relatively low power compared to the transported weight.

=== Dimensions ===
Key numbers:

- Reinforced concrete slope, with steel rails, allowing a horizontal move of 108.6 metres and a level change of 44.5 metres (slope of 41% - angle of 22°);
- steel caisson 41.5 m long, 5.5 m wide and 3.2 m deep (730 cubic metres capacity), steel carriage on 32 steel wheels, the whole weighing about 900 tonnes. It travels at the speed of 0.6 m/s (2.2 km/h);
- four lifting gates (two at the caisson and one at each level);
- two concrete counterweights on guided carriages of 450 tonnes each. Each counterweight is fastened to the caisson by means of 14 steel cables of 27 millimetres diameter;
- in the machine room, two winches each driven by a 90 kW electrical motor which ensures operation;
- a power-generating unit allows the inclined plane to be used even in the event of long power cuts.

At the beginning, two caissons were planned but, with the decline of water transport, only one was built.

=== Performance and traffic ===
The inclined plane of Saint-Louis-Arzviller is able to carry 39 barges per day. Each journey is made in four minutes, making a total transportation time of twenty minutes between going in and going out. While the inclined plane is staffed by two people, water losses are limited to 40 cubic metres and electrical consumption to 40 megajoules (10 kWh) per journey.

The decline in merchant water transport is partly offset by tourist traffic and the carrying of thousands of pleasure boats per year.

Evolution of traffic:

- merchant boats : 1969 = 5788, 1979 = 2914, 1989 = 1015, 1999 = 272, 2004 = 284
- pleasure boats : 1975 = 145, 1979 = 521, 1989 = 5330, 1999 = 7486, 2004 = 6624

Since the early 21st century, a slight increase in merchant traffic and a slight decrease in tourist traffic have been observed; while energy costs still rise, this could be more effective.

The tourist association of Saint-Louis-Arzviller inclined plane, which has managed the guided visits since the site opened, welcomes about 150,000 visitors per year. This makes this site the most visited one in Lorraine.

=== Incident of 4 July 2013 ===
Shortly before 12pm local time, the tourist barge Paris, which belongs to the Association and provides visits to tourists, was entering the caisson from the upper canal. The caisson suddenly moved down, jamming the barge with its 21 passengers and releasing a vast quantity of water into the valley below. An extensive operation by the emergency services was put into operation with occupants of a nearby camping site and a restaurant in Lutzelbourg being evacuated.

Through traffic on the canal was suspended while a thorough inspection of the installation was undertaken, with closure originally estimated to last several months. The boat lift reopened briefly in 2014 but closed again after damage was discovered to the caisson. Ultimately the boat lift reopened again in the summer of 2015.

== See also ==
- Boat lift
- List of boat lifts
