= Salines Canal =

Planned canal in northeastern France

Canal des Salines

Specifications
- Length: 4 km (2.5 mi)
- Status: Closed Destroyed

History
- Principal engineer: C. C. Robin (1806), Alfred Picard (1870)
- Date approved: 1806
- Date closed: 1939 1940

Geography
- Direction: East/West
- Beginning coordinates: 48.8639°N 6.9330°E

The Canal des Salines (French pronunciation: [kanal de salin]) was a planned canal in north eastern France. In its full extent it would have connected the river Sarre at Sarralbe with the river Moselle at Metz, via Dieuze and Château-Salins. Only 4 km were completed, between Mittersheim and Loudrefing. The section between Sarralbe and Mittersheim was replaced by the Canal de la Sarre, built in the 1860s.

== See also ==
- List of canals in France
