= Garrebourg =

- Commune
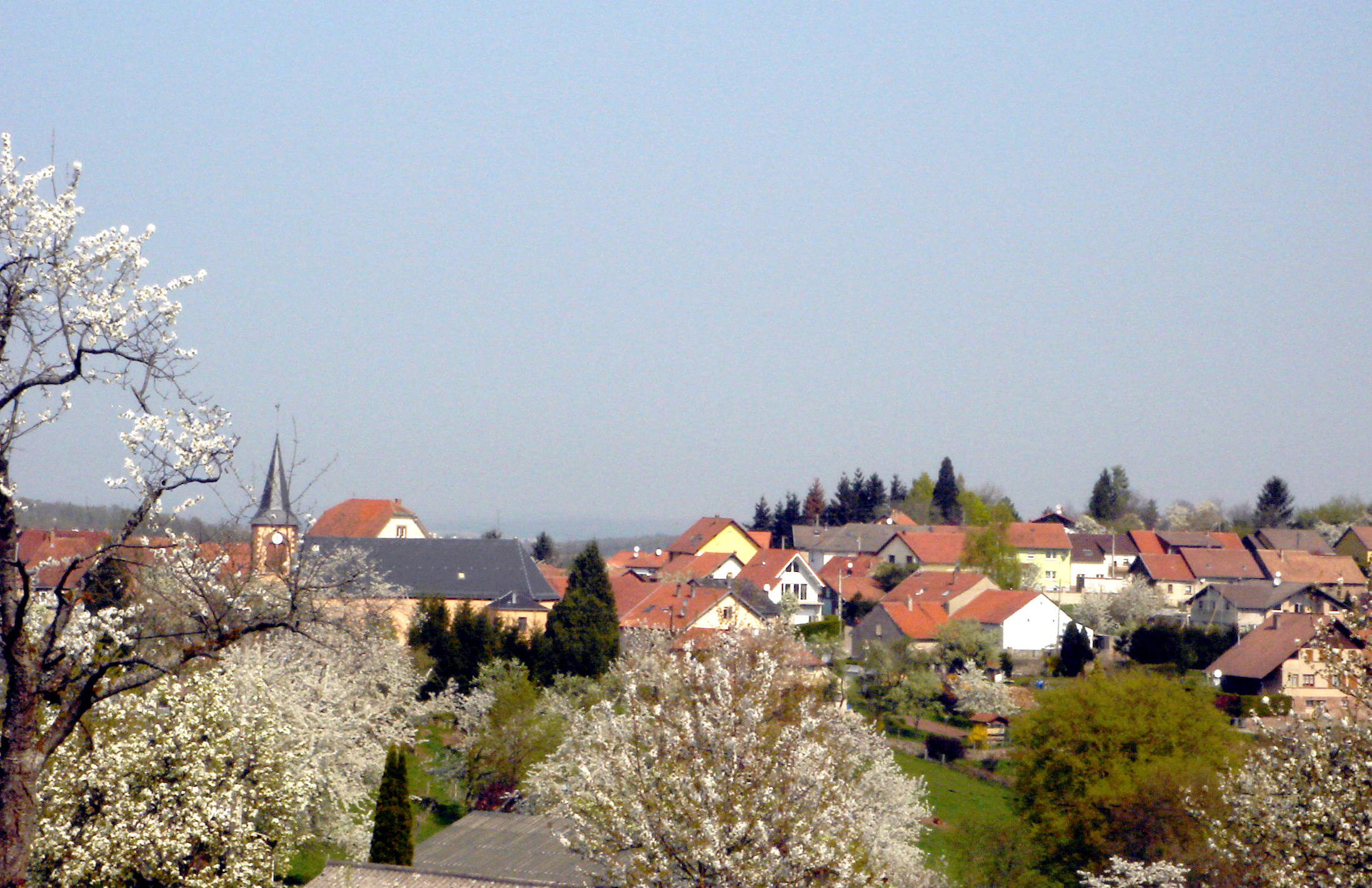
- A general view of Garrebourg

- Coat of arms
- Location of Garrebourg
- Location within France Location within Grand Est
- Coordinates: 48°42′43″N 7°14′02″E
- Country: France
- Region: Grand Est
- Department: Moselle
- Arrondissement: Sarrebourg-Château-Salins
- Canton: Phalsbourg
- Intercommunality: CC du Pays de Phalsbourg

Government
  - Mayor (2020–2026): Christian Fries
- Area^{1}: 8.34 km^{2} (3.22 sq mi)
- Elevation: 390 m (1,280 ft)
- Highest elevation: 491 m (1,611 ft)
- Lowest elevation: 215 m (705 ft)
- Population (2023): 485
  - Density: 58.2/km^{2} (151/sq mi)
- Time zone: UTC+01:00 (CET)
  - Summer (DST): UTC+02:00 (CEST)
- INSEE/Postal code: 57244 /57820
- ^{1} French Land Register data, which excludes lakes, ponds, glaciers > 1 km^{2} (0.386 sq mi or 247 acres) and river estuaries.

Garrebourg (French pronunciation: [ɡaʁbuʁ]; German: Garburg) is a commune in the Moselle department in Grand Est, north-eastern France.

== Toponymy ==
Throughout history, the name of the village has been written in different ways and many historians disagree about its origin.

In a German document, Ernst Herr, it is written that Garebergh, on the edge of the Marche de Marmoutier, existed as early as the beginning of the ninth century.

In the Toponymie générale de la France, it is noted that Garebeurc was already mentioned in the tenth century and became Garburg in 1576, then Garbourg and Garburg in 1719. The text states that the name Garrebourg comes from the Germanic Garo (a man's proper name) and Burg (mountain, fortified place).

According to Sigrist, the village is mentioned in twelfth-century charters under the name Bareberch, a village on the mount of Borra which, by corruption, became the modern Garberg or Garbourg. The word Borra was also used in ancient documents to refer to the Upper Barr.

According to Langethal, the name evolved into Bareberg, Barberch and then Garberch.

Finally, according to Guy Kremer, the Burgi were Lower Roman fortresses that commanded the passages through the northern Vosges, and Garre comes from Guaita, a Germanic military term that evolved into Warte (observatory) and garde in French. ‘Garrebourg’ would therefore mean “observatory fort”, which might make sense given the place known as Schlossberg, a mound overlooking the Zorn valley.

=== Nicknames of the inhabitants ===
Former nicknames for the inhabitants where "les Mounis", "Die Mounie" (‘the bulls’) and "D'Garburger Munnizieher" (‘those who hoist the bull’).

== History ==
Garrebourg has a very ancient history, having been inhabited since the Neolithic period.

=== Antiquity ===
Gallo-Roman remains at Kreuzkopf, Tiergarten, Schladen, Kessel, Langenbust and Wintersberg attest to the presence of humans in the actual region of Garrebourg from the early Christian era. According to François Pétry, these villages were created by the settlement of Mediomatrici populations.

=== Middle Ages ===
In the 12th century, Count Pierre of Lutzelbourg, baron of the Marmoutier estate, which he was responsible for defending, appropriated the forest of the neighbouring village of Hultehouse. Réginald, Pierre's son, returned the stolen property to the Marmoutier's abbey during Cardinal Théodovin's visit to Garrebourg.

== See also ==
- Communes of the Moselle department
