= Col de Saverne =

Coordinates: 48°45′19″N 7°19′50″E

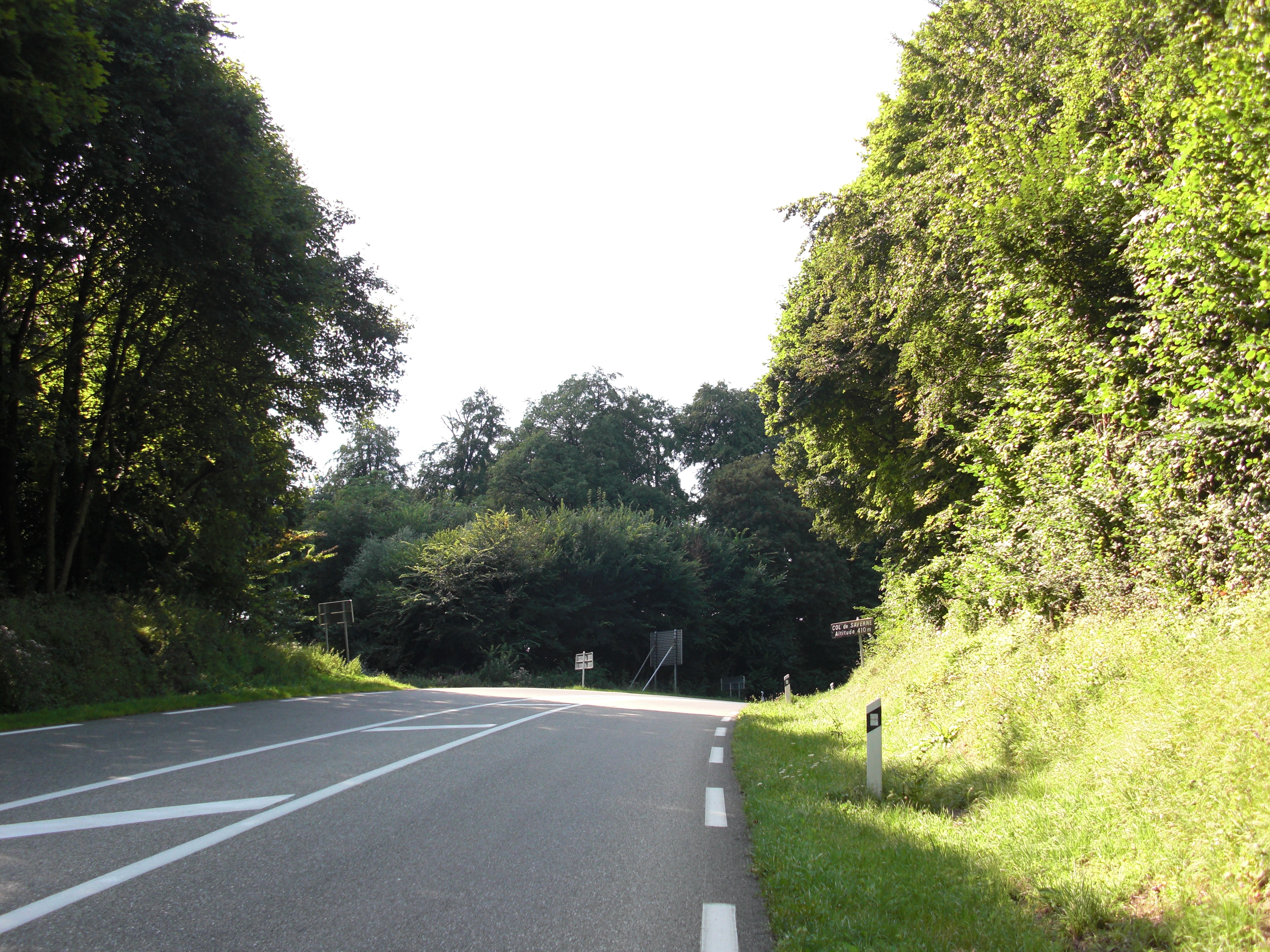
Col de Saverne

The Col de Saverne (French pronunciation: [kɔl də savɛʁn], Pass of Saverne or Saverne Pass; German: Zaberner Steige, pronounced [ˈtsaːbɐnɐ ˈʃtaɪ̯ɡə]) is a 410-m high natural pass in the north of the Vosges mountains, near Saverne, which permits travel between the départements of Bas-Rhin and Moselle, and therefore between Alsace and Lorraine.
Transport routes that traverse the Saverne Pass include national highway RN 4 and A4 autoroute A4, the Paris-Strasbourg railway, as well as the Marne-Rhine Canal.

The area is noted for its botanical gardens, especially the Jardin Botanique de Saverne and the Roseraie de Saverne.

The Saverne Gap (French: trouée de Saverne) is a gorge-like passage that cuts through the Vosges from Arzviller to Saverne, following the course of the Zorn River for most of its length. The passage is barely 100 yards wide at some points. It figured prominently into the advance of the U.S. XV Corps against German forces in the Second World War. The rapid traversal of the Saverne Gap resulted in a breakthrough by the French 2nd Armored Division, which subsequently liberated Strasbourg on November 23, 1944.

Johann Wolfgang von Goethe went through the pass twice on 23 June 1770 in order to visit Phalsbourg, and mentions the pass in detail in his autobiography Dichtung und Wahrheit.
