= Brouderdorff =

- Commune
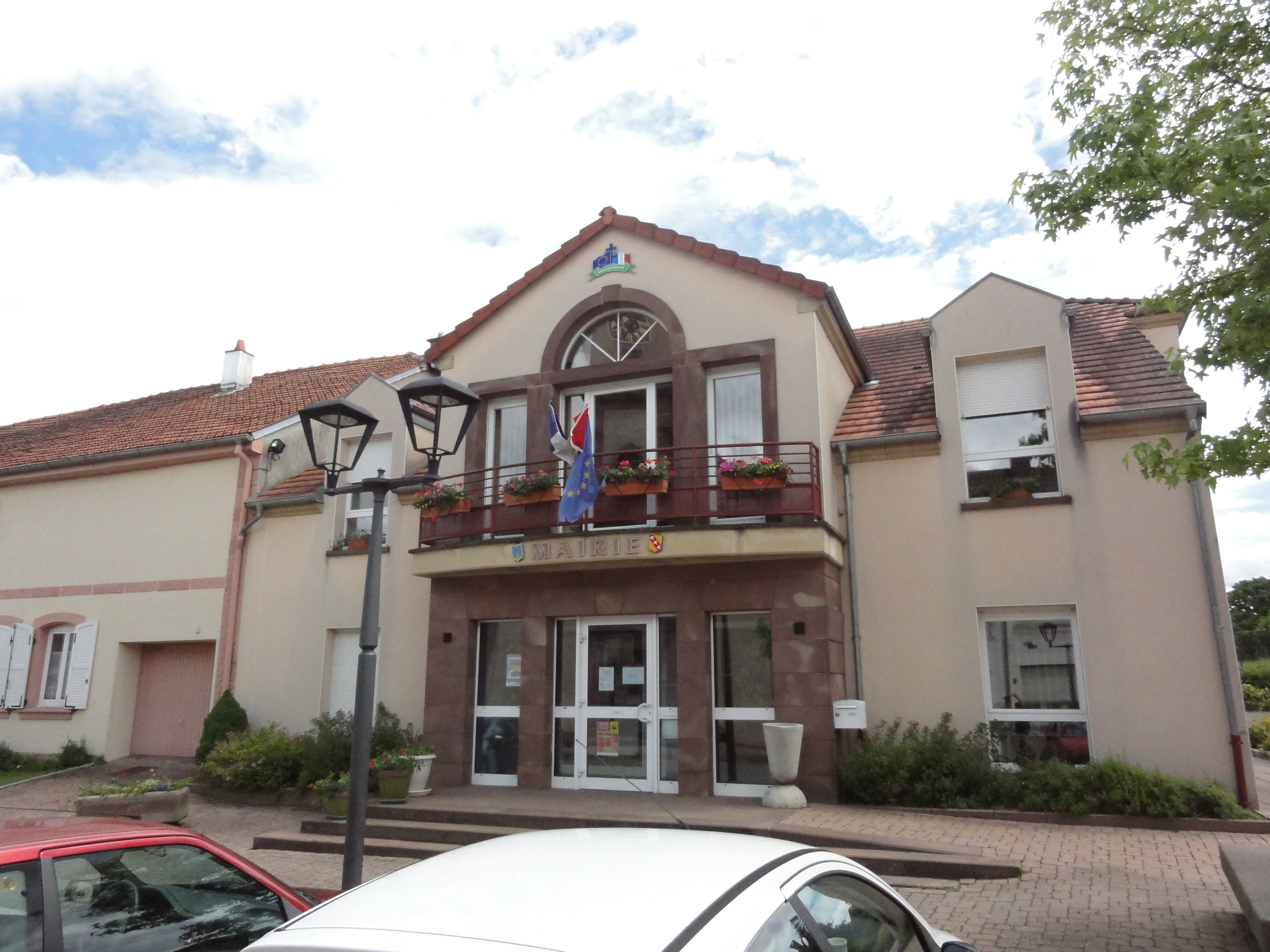
- The town hall in Brouderdorff

- Coat of arms
- Location of Brouderdorff
- Location within France Location within Grand Est
- Coordinates: 48°41′58″N 7°06′07″E
- Country: France
- Region: Grand Est
- Department: Moselle
- Arrondissement: Sarrebourg-Château-Salins
- Canton: Phalsbourg

Government
  - Mayor (2020–2026): François Klock
- Area^{1}: 4.78 km^{2} (1.85 sq mi)
- Elevation: 300 m (980 ft)
- Highest elevation: 355 m (1,165 ft)
- Lowest elevation: 266 m (873 ft)
- Population (2023): 987
  - Density: 206/km^{2} (535/sq mi)
- Time zone: UTC+01:00 (CET)
  - Summer (DST): UTC+02:00 (CEST)
- INSEE/Postal code: 57113 /57565
- ^{1} French Land Register data, which excludes lakes, ponds, glaciers > 1 km^{2} (0.386 sq mi or 247 acres) and river estuaries.

Brouderdorff (French pronunciation: [bʁudɛʁdɔʁf]; German: Bruderdorf) is a commune in the Moselle department in Grand Est in northeastern France.

== Toponymy ==
Brouderdorff means "the village of the brothers", because it was built by four brothers.

== History ==
The village of Brouderdorff was created in 1616 by the Counts of Lutzelbourg.

Between 1871 and 1918 Brouderdorff was annexed by the German Empire within the Reichsland Elsaß-Lothringen. The village suffered war damage between 1914 and 1918.

Brouderdorff was again annexed by Germany between 1940 and 1944.

== Population ==
Historical population
Year	Pop.	±% p.a.
1968	527	—
1975	608	+2.06%
1982	689	+1.80%
1990	720	+0.55%
1999	733	+0.20%
2007	899	+2.58%
2012	939	+0.87%
2017	966	+0.57%
2023	987	+0.36%
Source: INSEE

== See also ==
- Communes of the Moselle department
