= Hommarting =

- Commune
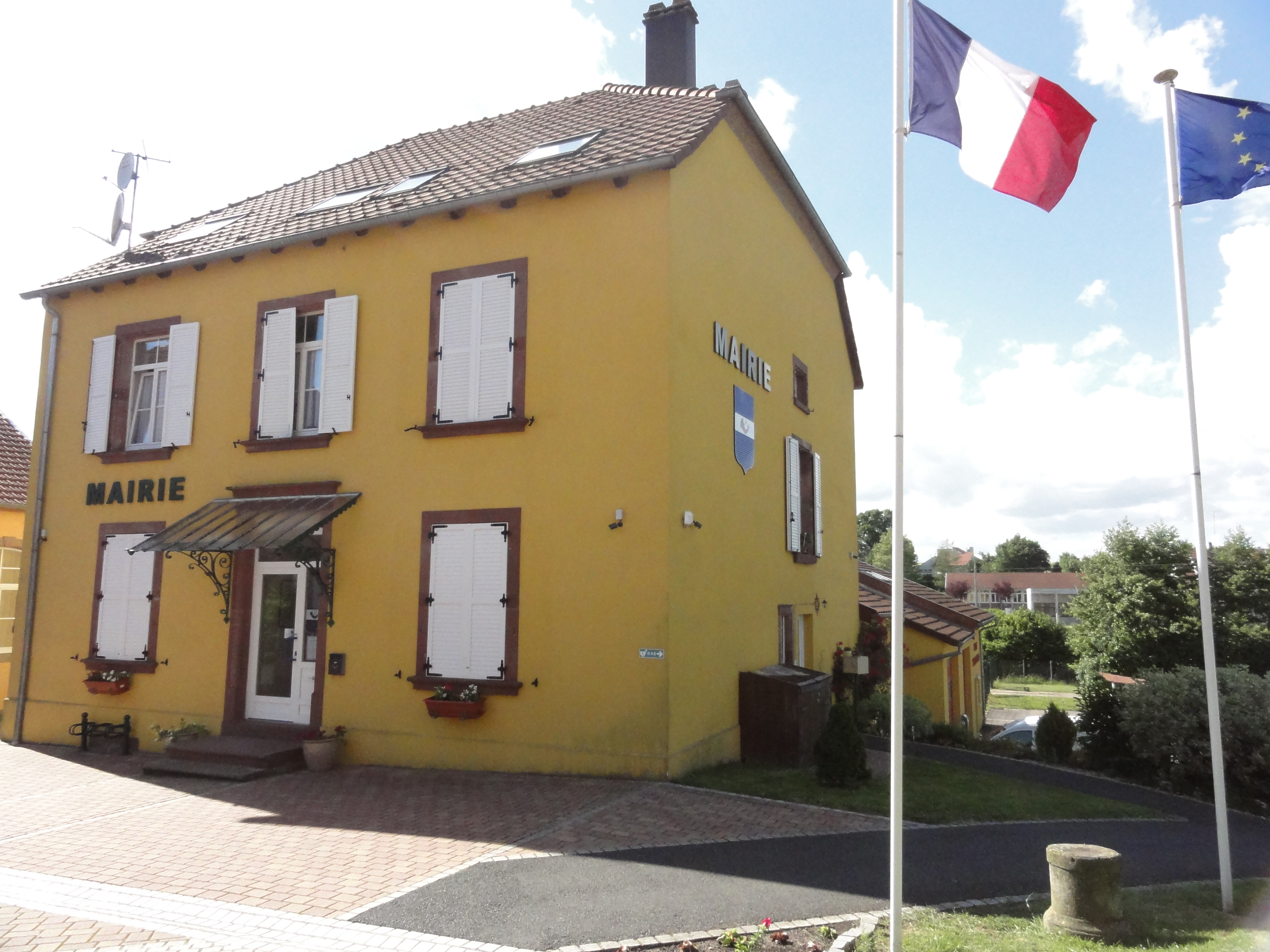
- The town hall in Hommarting

- Coat of arms
- Location of Hommarting
- Location within France Location within Grand Est
- Coordinates: 48°44′21″N 7°08′45″E
- Country: France
- Region: Grand Est
- Department: Moselle
- Arrondissement: Sarrebourg-Château-Salins
- Canton: Sarrebourg
- Intercommunality: CC Sarrebourg Moselle Sud

Government
  - Mayor (2020–2026): Jean-Louis Nisse
- Area^{1}: 10.19 km^{2} (3.93 sq mi)
- Elevation: 240 m (790 ft)
- Highest elevation: 336 m (1,102 ft)
- Lowest elevation: 257 m (843 ft)
- Population (2023): 847
  - Density: 83.1/km^{2} (215/sq mi)
- Time zone: UTC+01:00 (CET)
  - Summer (DST): UTC+02:00 (CEST)
- INSEE/Postal code: 57333 /57405
- ^{1} French Land Register data, which excludes lakes, ponds, glaciers > 1 km^{2} (0.386 sq mi or 247 acres) and river estuaries.

Hommarting (French pronunciation: [ɔmaʁtɛ̃]; German: Hommartingen) is a commune in the Moselle department in Grand Est in north-eastern France.

== Geography ==
This municipality is located in the historic region of Lorraine and is part of the pays de Sarrebourg.

It is located in the Rhine watershed within the Rhine-Meuse basin. It is drained by the Eichmatte stream, the Muellermatte stream, the Bubenbach stream and the Steiglenbach.

== Toponymy ==
Former names: Humertingen (XV^{e} siècle), Hummertingen (1490), Humertingen and Hommertingen (1525), Humerting (1556), Humerding (1675), Homertingen or Omertingen (1719), Homarting (1756), Hommartin (1793), Hommartingen (1871–1918), Humbertingen (1940–1944).

== History ==
Hommarting was a former possession of the Weissembourg and Marmoutier abbeys, as well as of the Bishopric of Metz. It was also held in fief by numerous lords (Lutzelbourg, Lening-Réchicourt).

In 1661, with the treaty of Vincennes between the duke of Lorraine and Louis XIV, the commune became French.

== See also ==
- Communes of the Moselle department
