= Marne–Rhine Canal =

Waterway in eastern France

Canal de la Marne au Rhin
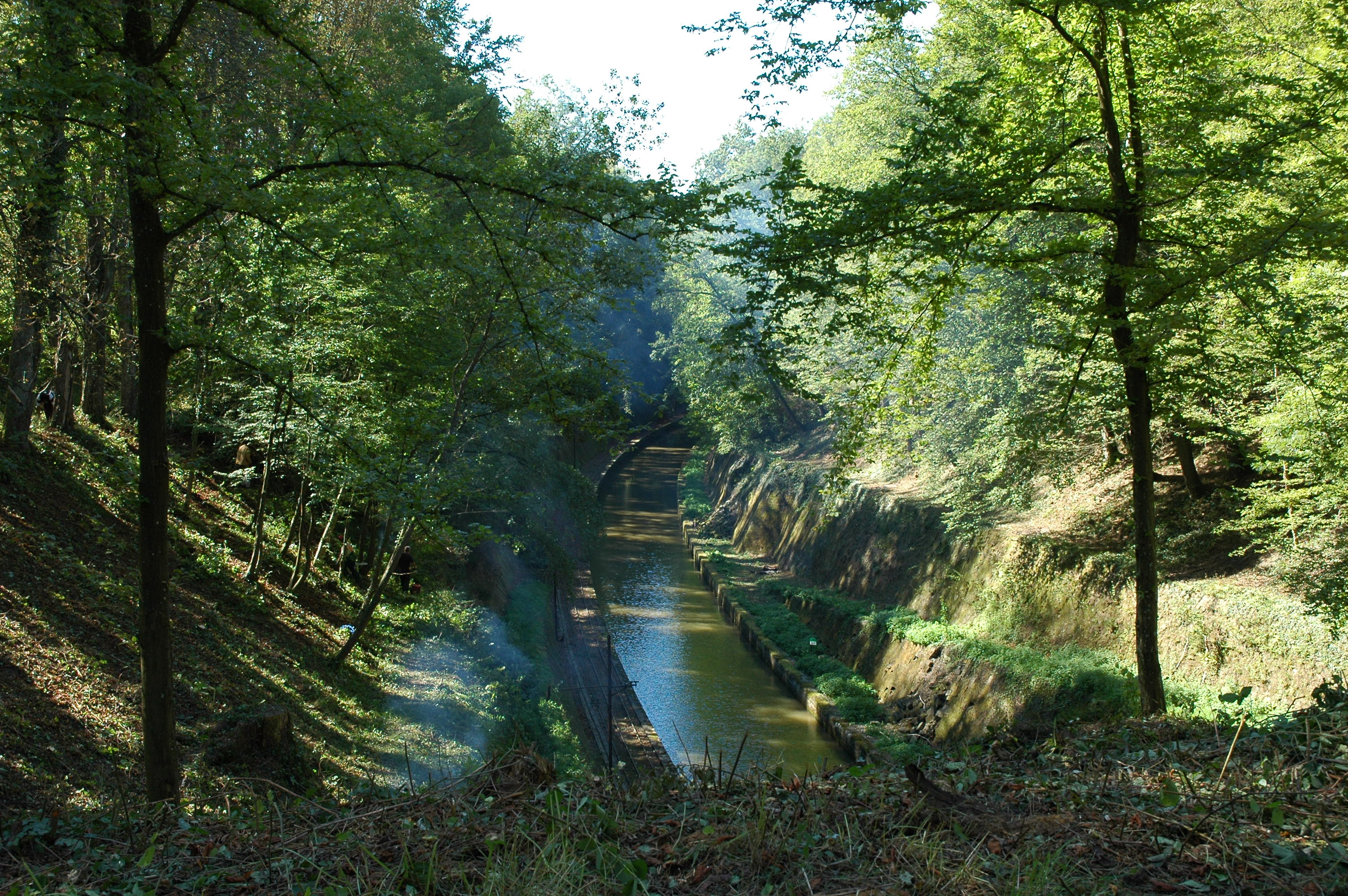
- The Marne-Rhine Canal at Niderviller, Moselle

Specifications
- Length: 313 km (194 mi)
- Locks: 154 (originally 178)

History
- Construction began: 1838
- Date completed: 1853

Geography
- Start point: Canal latéral à la Marne in Vitry-le-François
- End point: Rhine in Strasbourg
- Beginning coordinates: 48°43′48″N 4°36′24″E
- Ending coordinates: 48°35′26″N 7°47′16″E
- Connects to: Canal latéral à la Marne, Canal entre Champagne et Bourgogne, Canal de la Meuse, Moselle, Canal de la Sarre, Rhine

The Canal de la Marne au Rhin (French pronunciation: [kanal də la maʁn o ʁɛ̃], Marne–Rhine Canal) is a canal in north-eastern France. It connects the river Marne and the Canal entre Champagne et Bourgogne in Vitry-le-François with the port of Strasbourg on the Rhine. The original objective of the canal was to connect Paris and the north of France with Alsace and Lorraine, the Rhine, and Germany. The 313 km (194 mi) long canal was the longest in France when it opened in 1853.

== Description ==
The canal is suited for small barges (péniches), with a maximum size of 38.50 metres (126.3 ft) in length and 5.05 metres (16.6 ft) in width. It has 154 locks, including two in the Moselle. There are four tunnels. The Saint-Louis-Arzviller inclined plane is located between Arzviller and Saint-Louis and its construction replaced 17 locks.

In 1979, a 23 kilometres (14 mi) section along the Moselle valley was closed following the completion of the Moselle canalisation works between Frouard and Neuves-Maisons. The route is now made up as follows:

- Canal de la Marne au Rhin, western section (PK 0-131), connecting with the Canal de la Meuse at Troussey (PK 111), and with a branch to Houdelaincourt (PK 85),
- the navigable river Moselle from Toul to Pompey and the Frouard branch from Pompey to Frouard (a distance of 25 km, slightly longer than by the original canal),
- the eastern section, from Frouard to Strasbourg (PK 154-313); this section connects with the Nancy branch at Laneuveville-devant-Nancy (PK 169), the Canal de la Sarre at Gondrexange (PK 228), and the river Ill in Strasbourg (PK 311).

The western section, 131.4 km (81.6 mi) has 97 locks, 70 rising to the summit level and 27 down to the Moselle at Toul. The Moselle section has three locks of high-capacity Rhine dimensions on the river and one on the Frouard branch, and an additional Freycinet size lock connecting to the original canal in Frouard. The eastern section, 159 km (99 mi), has 56 locks, 21 rising to the summit level crossing the Vosges watershed and 35 down to Strasbourg.

Its course crosses the following départements and towns:

- Marne: Vitry-le-François
- Meuse: Bar-le-Duc, Ligny-en-Barrois, Void-Vacon
- Meurthe-et-Moselle: Toul, Nancy
- Moselle: Gondrexange, Sarrebourg
- Bas-Rhin: Saverne, Strasbourg

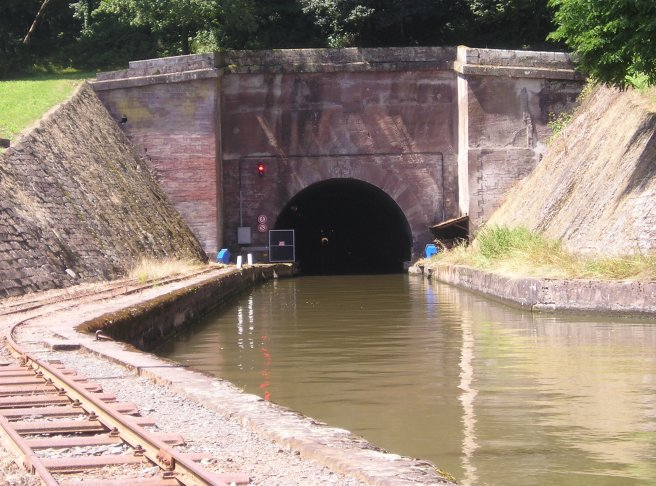
Tunnel near Arzviller

== En Route ==
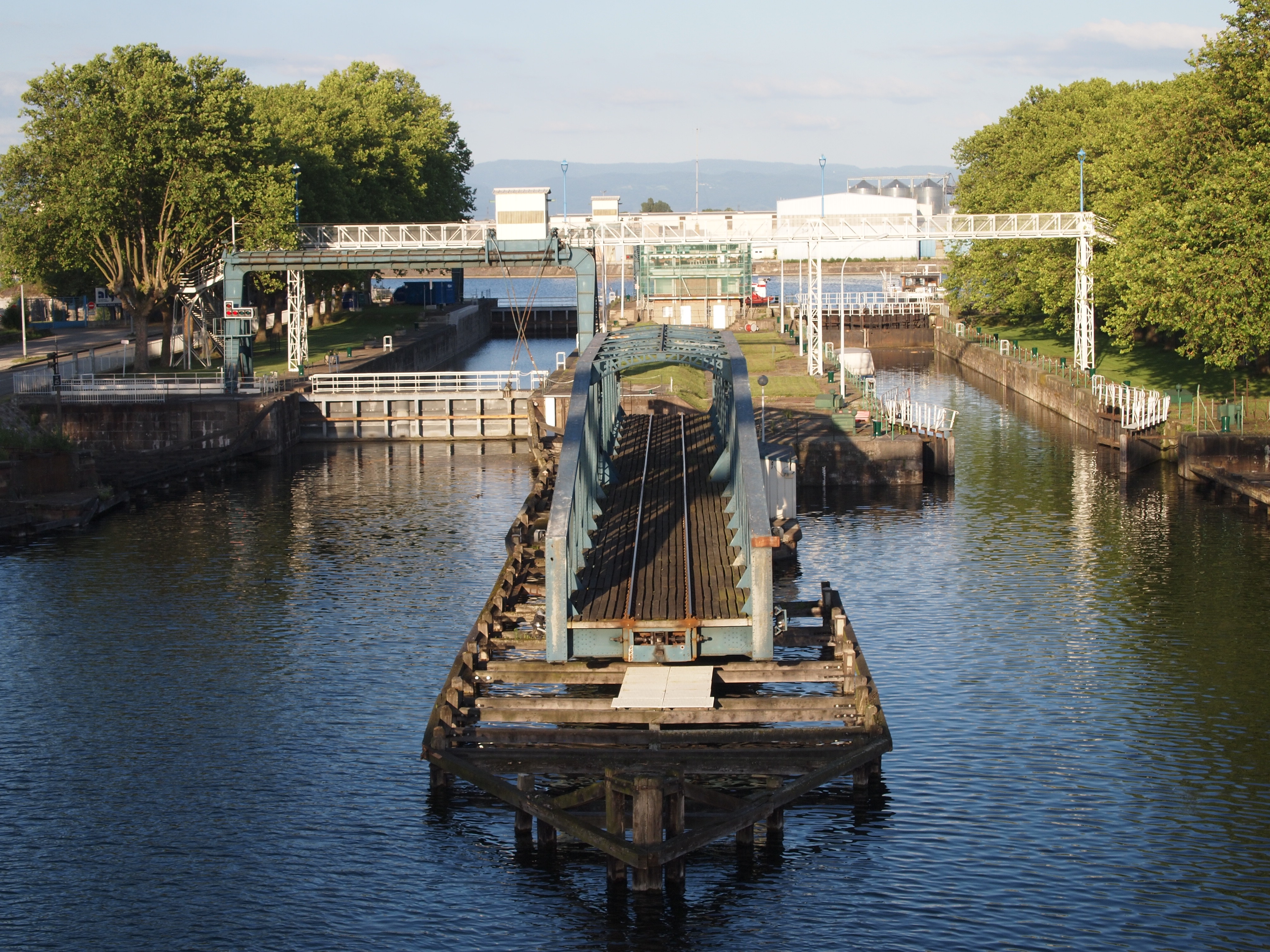
The end in Strasbourg

PK 0	Vitry-le-François	48°43′48″N 4°36′24″E
PK 47	Bar-le-Duc	48°46′27″N 5°10′08″E
PK 62	Ligny-en-Barrois	48°41′16″N 5°19′05″E
PK 86.5	Mauvages tunnel	48°35′04″N 5°31′08″E
PK 111	junction with Canal de la Meuse	48°42′52″N 5°41′24″E
PK 130	Toul	48°40′40″N 5°53′02″E
PK 131.5	junction with Moselle	48°40′59″N 5°54′21″E
PK 154.5	entrance to canal from Frouard branch of Moselle	
PK 164	Nancy	48°41′38″N 6°11′34″E
PK 178	Dombasle	48°37′41″N 6°20′42″E
PK 222	Réchicourt	48°41′32″N 6°50′42″E
PK 255	Saint-Louis-Arzviller inclined plane	48°42′57″N 7°13′06″E
PK 259	Lutzelbourg	48°44′09″N 7°15′23″E
PK 269	Saverne	48°44′34″N 7°21′59″E
PK 286	Hochfelden	48°44′56″N 7°34′10″E
PK 307	Souffelweyersheim	48°38′03″N 7°45′10″E
PK 313	Strasbourg	48°35′26″N 7°47′16″E

== See also ==
- List of canals in France
