= Jardin botanique du col de Saverne =

Botanical garden and arboretum in Alsace, France

Coordinates: 48.750°N 7.341°E

The Jardin botanique du col de Saverne (2.5 hectares), also known as the Jardin botanique de Saverne, is a botanical garden and arboretum located along the Col de Saverne near Saverne, Bas-Rhin, Alsace, France. It is open on weekends, and daily in the warmer months; an admission fee is charged.

The garden was established in 1931 by naturalists including botanist Emile Walter (1873-1953). Since 1965 it has been jointly managed by the Université Louis Pasteur de Strasbourg, the town of Saverne, and the garden association; in 2003 the Région Alsace also became a partner.

The garden is located on the Saverne Pass hillside at an altitude of 335 metres, and organized into sectors by plant classification. It describes its indigenous orchid section as the largest in France, with about 20 species; the garden also contains an excellent collection of ferns, as well as alpine plants and a peat bog for carnivorous plants. The arboretum occupies one third of the garden area, and contains species from North America, Europe, and Asia.

The garden's orchid collections include Aceras anthropophorum, Anacamptis pyramidalis, Bletilla striata, Cypripedium calceolus, Cypripedium formosanum, Dactylorhiza maculata, Gymnadenia conopsea, Himantoglossum hircinum, Orchis militaris, Orchis morio, and Orchis simia. Fern collections include Adiantum pedatum, Asplenium scolopendrium, Athyrium filix-femina, Blechnum spicant, Dryopteris affinis, Gymnocarpium robertianum, Matteuccia struthiopteris, Phegopteris connectilis, Phyllitis scolopendrium, and Physematium obtusum. Other specimens of interest include Ononis natrix, Pleioblastus nagashima, Saruma henryi, Shibataea kumasasa, and Sinowilsonia henryi.

Its arboretum contains a range of species including Abies cephalonica, Abies cilicica, Acer capillipes, Amelanchier lamarckii, Cladrastis sinensis, Crataegus mollis, Eryngium giganteum, Liriodendron tulipifera, Malus sieversii, Photinia davidiana, Picea asperata, Picea omorika, Pinus jeffreyi, Pinus sylvestris, Sequoiadendron giganteum, Sorbus aria, and Sorbus reducta.

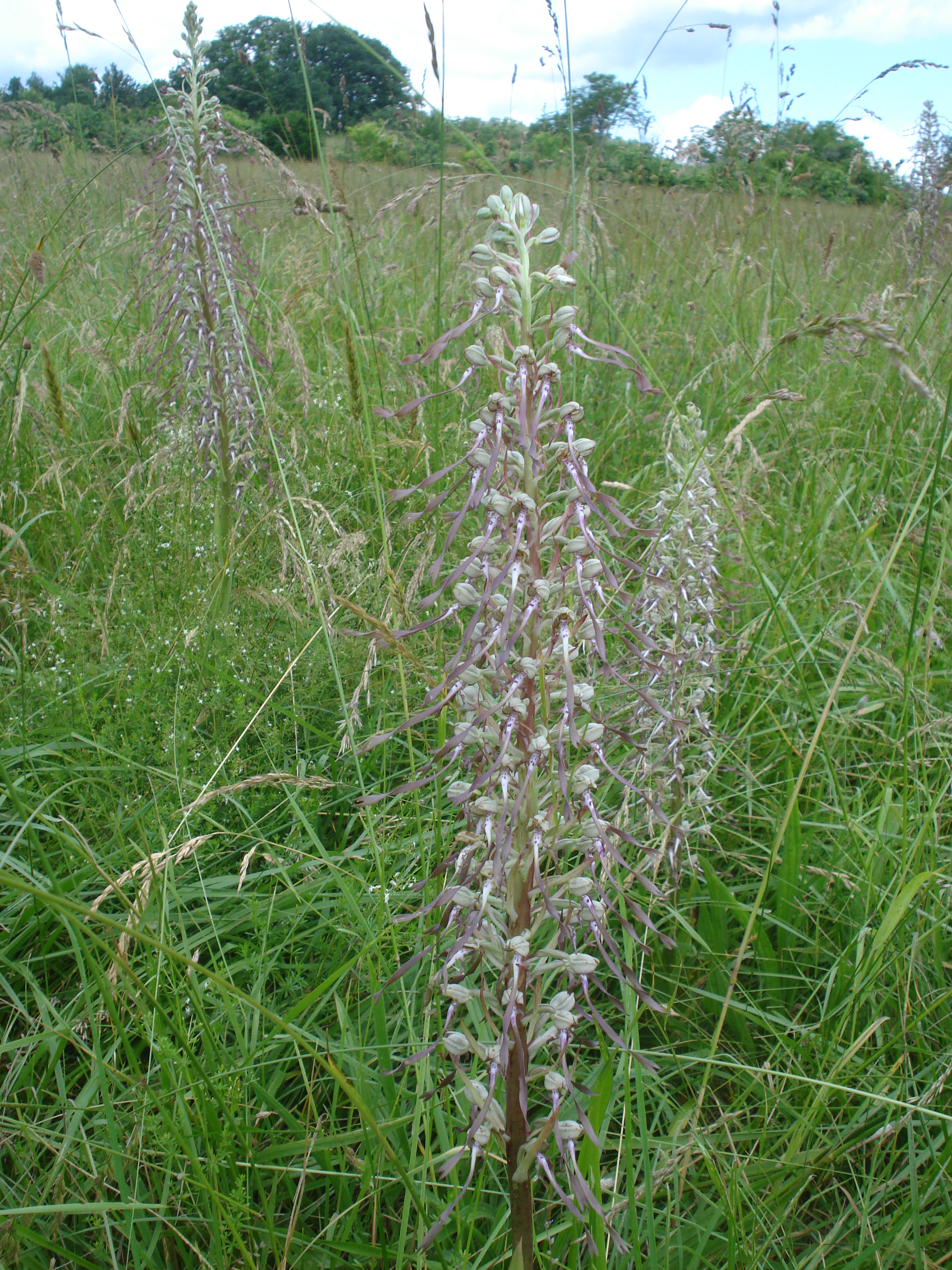
Jardin botanique du col de Saverne

== See also ==
- List of botanical gardens in France
