= Sarre Canal =

Canal in France

Coordinates: 48°42′N 6°55′E

Canal de la Sarre
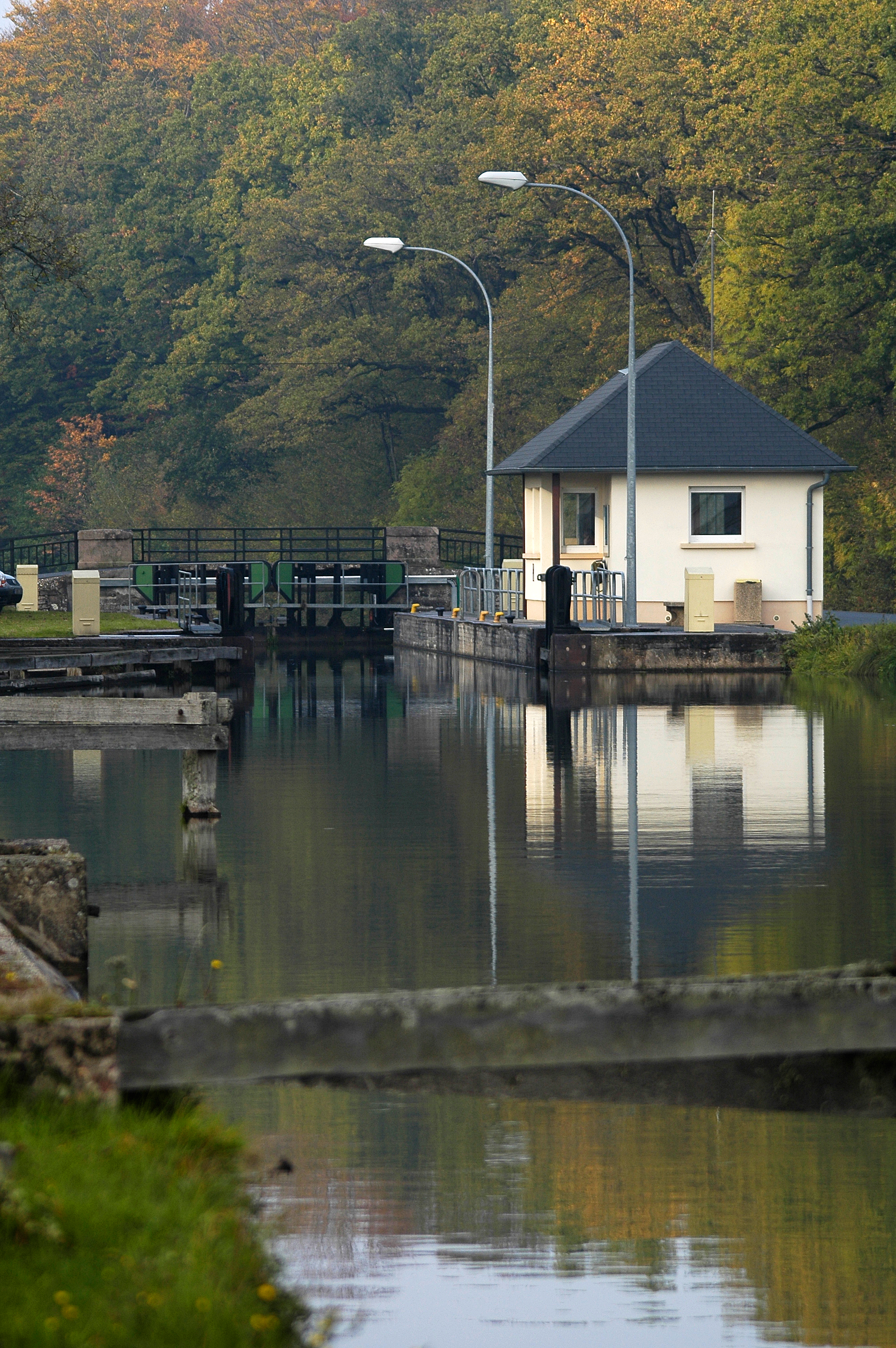
- Canal lock 1

Specifications
- Length: 75.5 km (46.9 mi)
- Locks: 30

History
- Current owner: VNF
- Construction began: 1861
- Date completed: 1866

Geography
- Start point: Canal de la Marne au Rhin in Gondrexange
- End point: Saar River in Sarreguemines

The Canal de la Sarre (French pronunciation: [kanal də la saʁ]), originally called Canal des Houillères de la Sarre ([kanal de ujɛʁ də la saʁ]), connects the Canal de la Marne au Rhin in Gondrexange to the canalised river Sarre (German: Saar) in Sarreguemines in northeastern France. For convenience this entry covers the entire waterway in France, including the canalised river. The canal is 63 km long, and the French portion of the canalised river Sarre is 12 km long, making a total of 75 km, with respectively 28 and 2 locks.

== History ==
The canal was built to carry coal from the mines around Saarbrücken, hence its original name. After a private company failed in 1844, the State took over the project and started works in 1861, to be completed in 1867. Although predating the Freycinet programme by nearly 20 years, it was built directly to these dimensions, justified by the volume of coal to be exported from the Saar collieries in Germany. The river Saar downstream from Saarbrücken was unnavigable until the canalisation works were completed in 1986.

== Development for tourism ==
The canal is rural in character and charming throughout. Through navigation down to the Moselle near Trier, 90 km beyond Saarbrücken, is possible, thanks to canalisation of the Saar in Germany. The cross-border connection was blocked for two years following closure of the first lock in Germany, at Güdingen, but was expected to be reopened in 2017.

== See also ==
- List of canals in France
