= Vieux-Lixheim =

- Commune
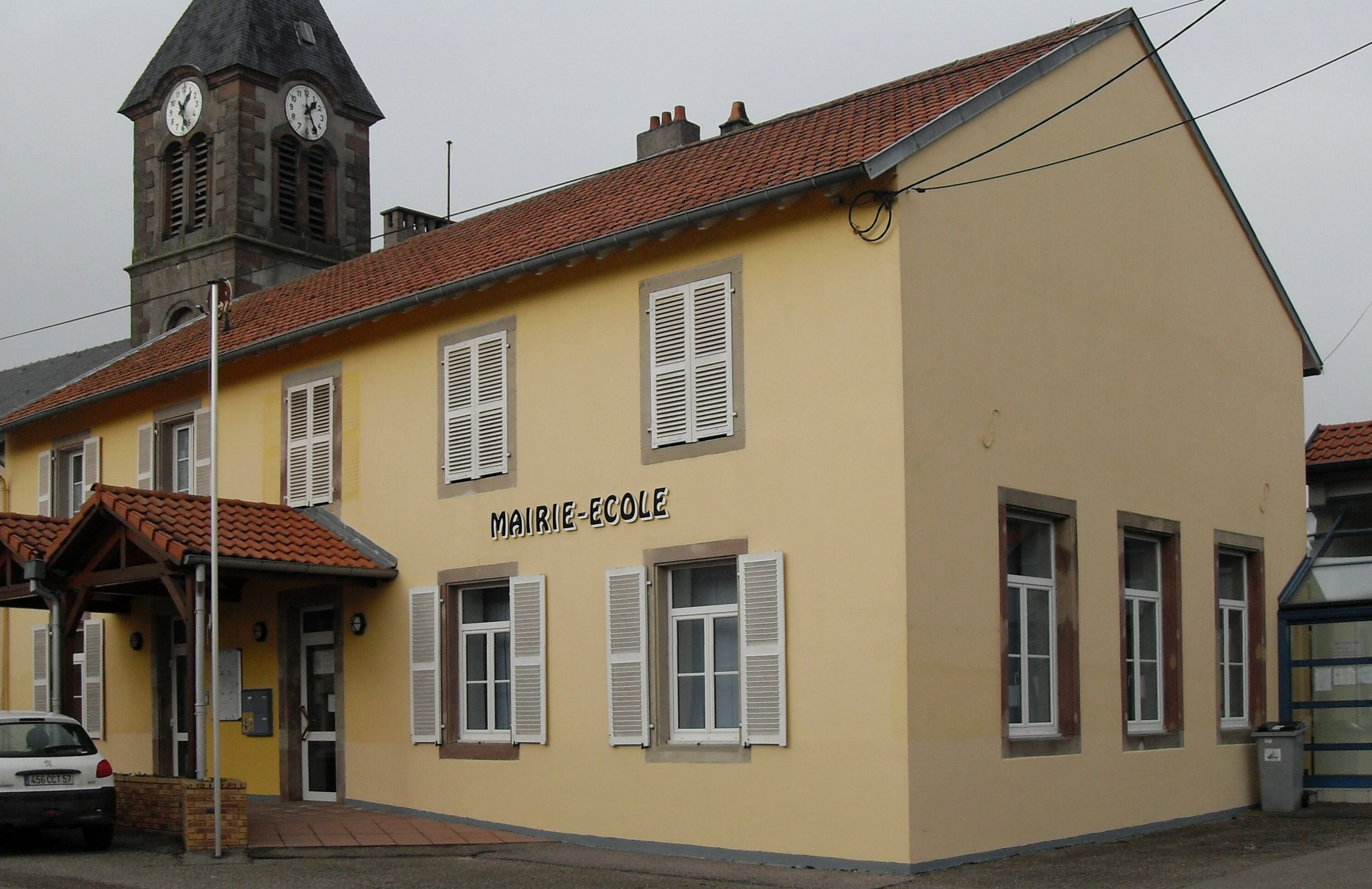
- The town hall and school in Vieux-Lixheim

- Coat of arms
- Location of Vieux-Lixheim
- Location within France Location within Grand Est
- Coordinates: 48°46′43″N 7°08′00″E
- Country: France
- Region: Grand Est
- Department: Moselle
- Arrondissement: Sarrebourg-Château-Salins
- Canton: Sarrebourg
- Intercommunality: Sarrebourg - Moselle Sud

Government
  - Mayor (2020–2026): Michel Bachet
- Area^{1}: 6.45 km^{2} (2.49 sq mi)
- Elevation: 300 m (980 ft)
- Highest elevation: 337 m (1,106 ft)
- Lowest elevation: 267 m (876 ft)
- Population (2023): 249
  - Density: 38.6/km^{2} (100/sq mi)
- Time zone: UTC+01:00 (CET)
  - Summer (DST): UTC+02:00 (CEST)
- INSEE/Postal code: 57713 /57635
- ^{1} French Land Register data, which excludes lakes, ponds, glaciers > 1 km^{2} (0.386 sq mi or 247 acres) and river estuaries.

Vieux-Lixheim (German: Altlixheim) is a commune in the Moselle department in Grand Est in north-eastern France. The commune Lixheim lies 1 km to the south-east.

== See also ==
- Communes of the Moselle department
