= Niederstinzel =

- Commune
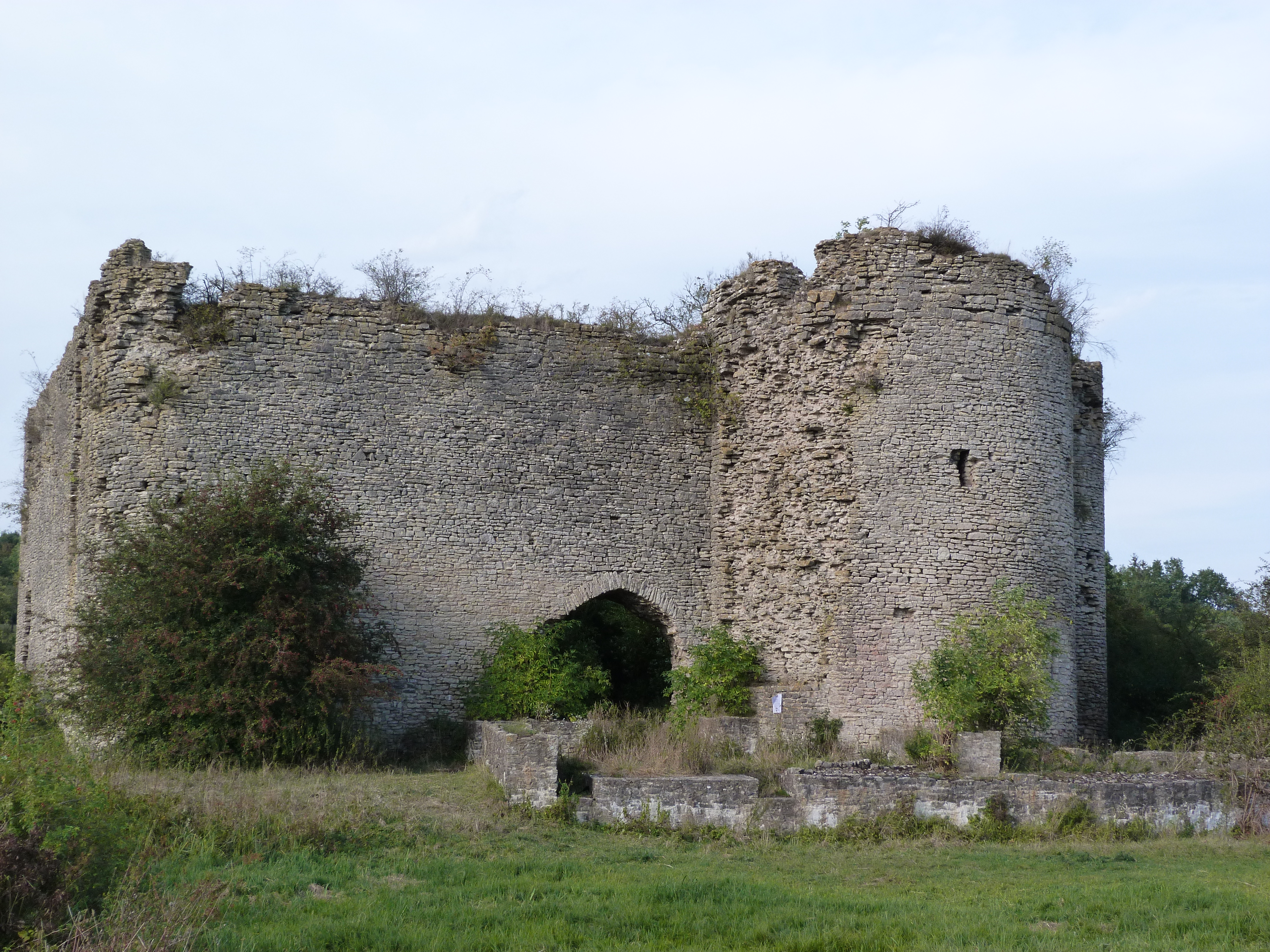
- The château of Geroldseck

- Coat of arms
- Location of Niederstinzel
- Location within France Location within Grand Est
- Coordinates: 48°51′48″N 7°01′56″E
- Country: France
- Region: Grand Est
- Department: Moselle
- Arrondissement: Sarrebourg-Château-Salins
- Canton: Sarrebourg
- Intercommunality: Sarrebourg - Moselle Sud

Government
  - Mayor (2020–2026): Patrick Sinteff
- Area^{1}: 12.96 km^{2} (5.00 sq mi)
- Elevation: 240 m (790 ft)
- Highest elevation: 286 m (938 ft)
- Lowest elevation: 222 m (728 ft)
- Population (2023): 235
  - Density: 18.1/km^{2} (47.0/sq mi)
- Time zone: UTC+01:00 (CET)
  - Summer (DST): UTC+02:00 (CEST)
- INSEE/Postal code: 57506 /57930
- ^{1} French Land Register data, which excludes lakes, ponds, glaciers > 1 km^{2} (0.386 sq mi or 247 acres) and river estuaries.

Niederstinzel is a commune in the Moselle department in Grand Est in north-eastern France. The similarly named commune Oberstinzel lies 8 km to the south.

== See also ==
- Communes of the Moselle department
