= Hellering-lès-Fénétrange =

- Commune
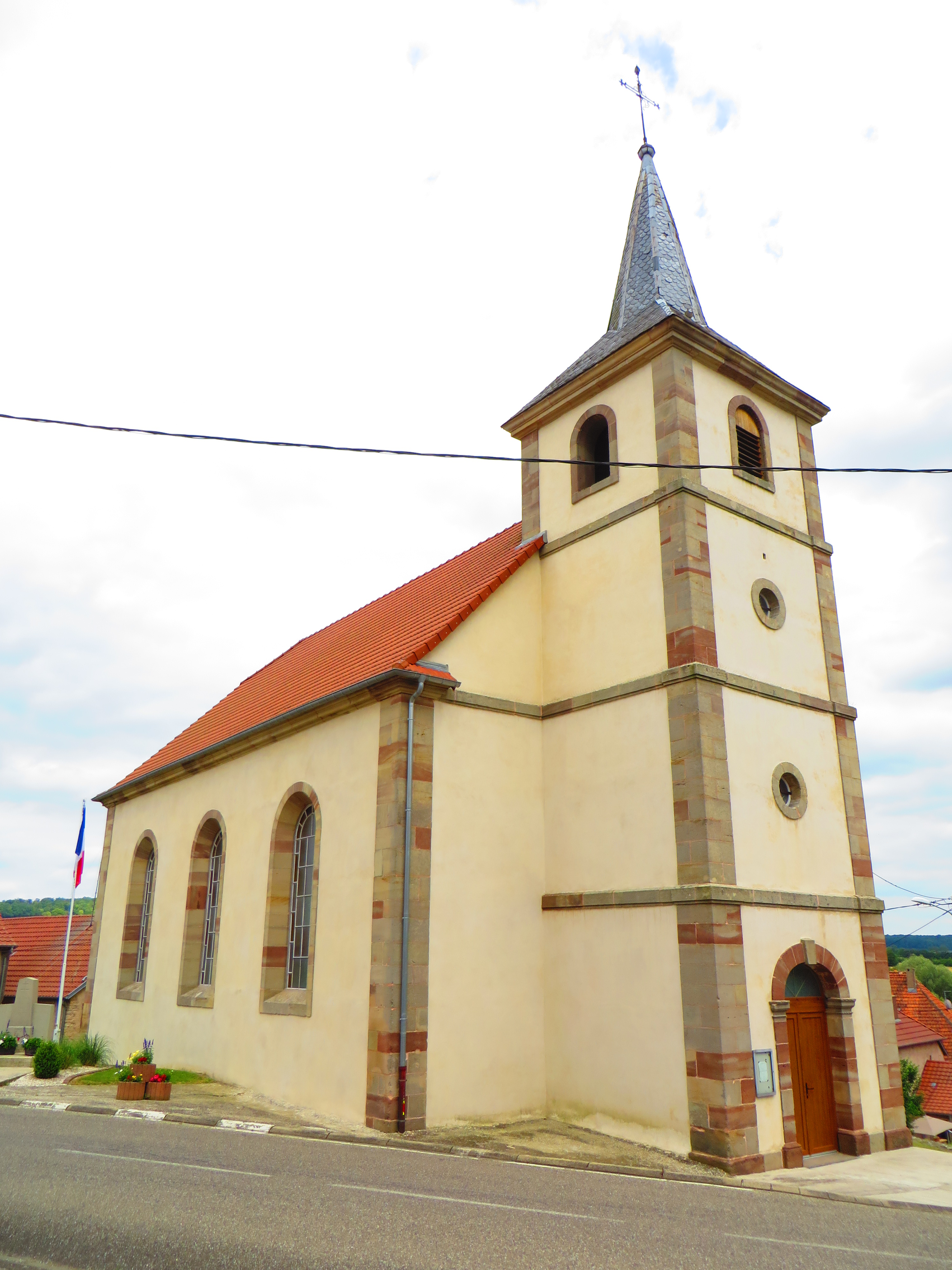
- Protestant church in Hellering-lès-Fénétrange

- Coat of arms
- Location of Hellering-lès-Fénétrange
- Location within France Location within Grand Est
- Coordinates: 48°48′37″N 7°03′52″E
- Country: France
- Region: Grand Est
- Department: Moselle
- Arrondissement: Sarrebourg-Château-Salins
- Canton: Sarrebourg
- Intercommunality: Sarrebourg - Moselle Sud

Government
  - Mayor (2020–2026): Daniel Berger
- Area^{1}: 4.05 km^{2} (1.56 sq mi)
- Highest elevation: 332 m (1,089 ft)
- Lowest elevation: 247 m (810 ft)
- Population (2023): 186
  - Density: 45.9/km^{2} (119/sq mi)
- Time zone: UTC+01:00 (CET)
  - Summer (DST): UTC+02:00 (CEST)
- INSEE/Postal code: 57310 /57930
- ^{1} French Land Register data, which excludes lakes, ponds, glaciers > 1 km^{2} (0.386 sq mi or 247 acres) and river estuaries.

Hellering-lès-Fénétrange (French pronunciation: [ɛlʁɛ̃ lɛ fenetʁɑ̃ʒ], literally Hellering near Fénétrange; German: Helleringen) is a commune in the Moselle department in Grand Est in north-eastern France.

== See also ==
- Communes of the Moselle department
