= Saint-Louis, Moselle =

Saint-Louis
- Commune
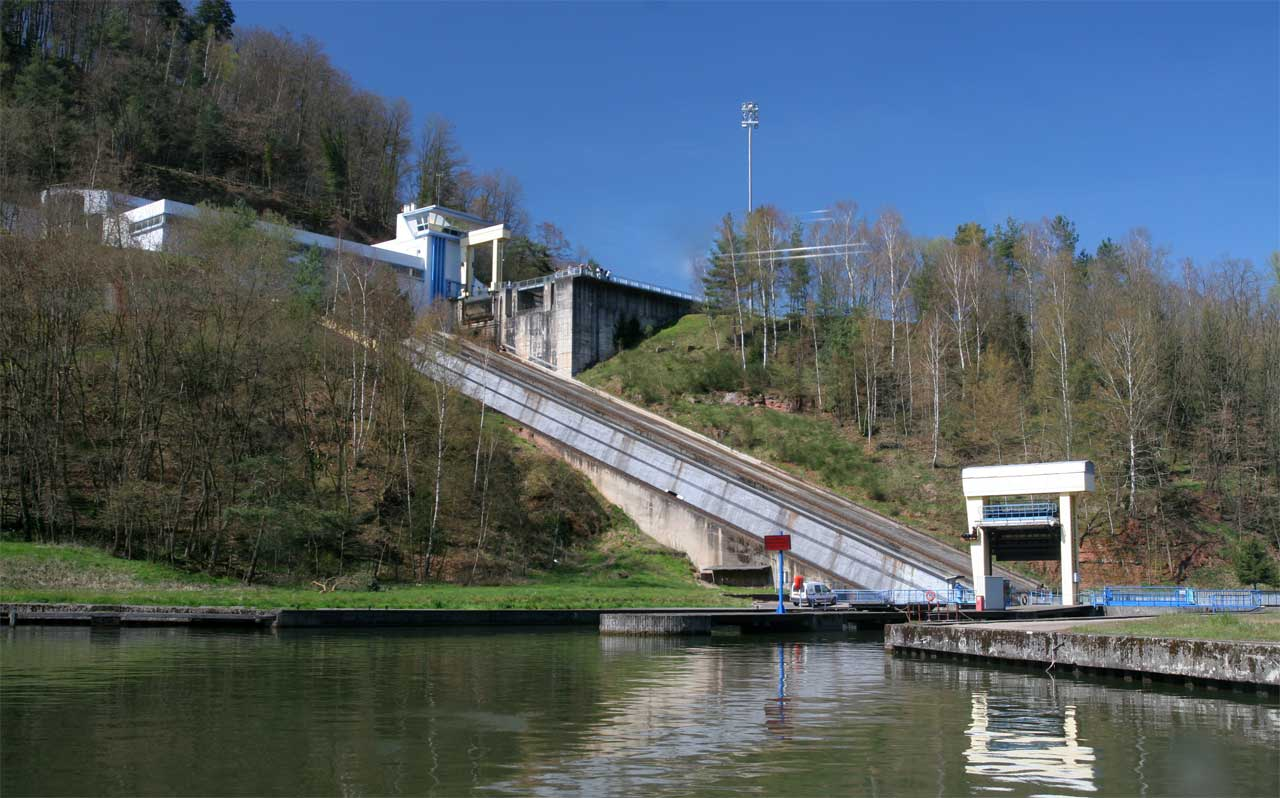
- Saint-Louis-Arzviller inclined plane

- Coat of arms
- Location of Saint-Louis
- Location within France Location within Grand Est
- Coordinates: 48°43′01″N 7°11′20″E
- Country: France
- Region: Grand Est
- Department: Moselle
- Arrondissement: Sarrebourg-Château-Salins
- Canton: Phalsbourg
- Intercommunality: Pays de Phalsbourg

Government
  - Mayor (2020–2026): Gilbert Fixaris
- Area^{1}: 9.28 km^{2} (3.58 sq mi)
- Highest elevation: 393 m (1,289 ft)
- Lowest elevation: 215 m (705 ft)
- Population (2023): 617
  - Density: 66.5/km^{2} (172/sq mi)
- Time zone: UTC+01:00 (CET)
  - Summer (DST): UTC+02:00 (CEST)
- INSEE/Postal code: 57618 /57820
- ^{1} French Land Register data, which excludes lakes, ponds, glaciers > 1 km^{2} (0.386 sq mi or 247 acres) and river estuaries.

Saint-Louis (French pronunciation: [sɛ̃ lwi]; German: Sankt Ludwig bei Pfalzburg; Lorraine Franconian: Sînt-Lui) is a commune in the Moselle department in Grand Est in north-eastern France.

== See also ==
- Communes of the Moselle department
- Saint-Louis-Arzviller inclined plane
