= Arzviller =

- Commune
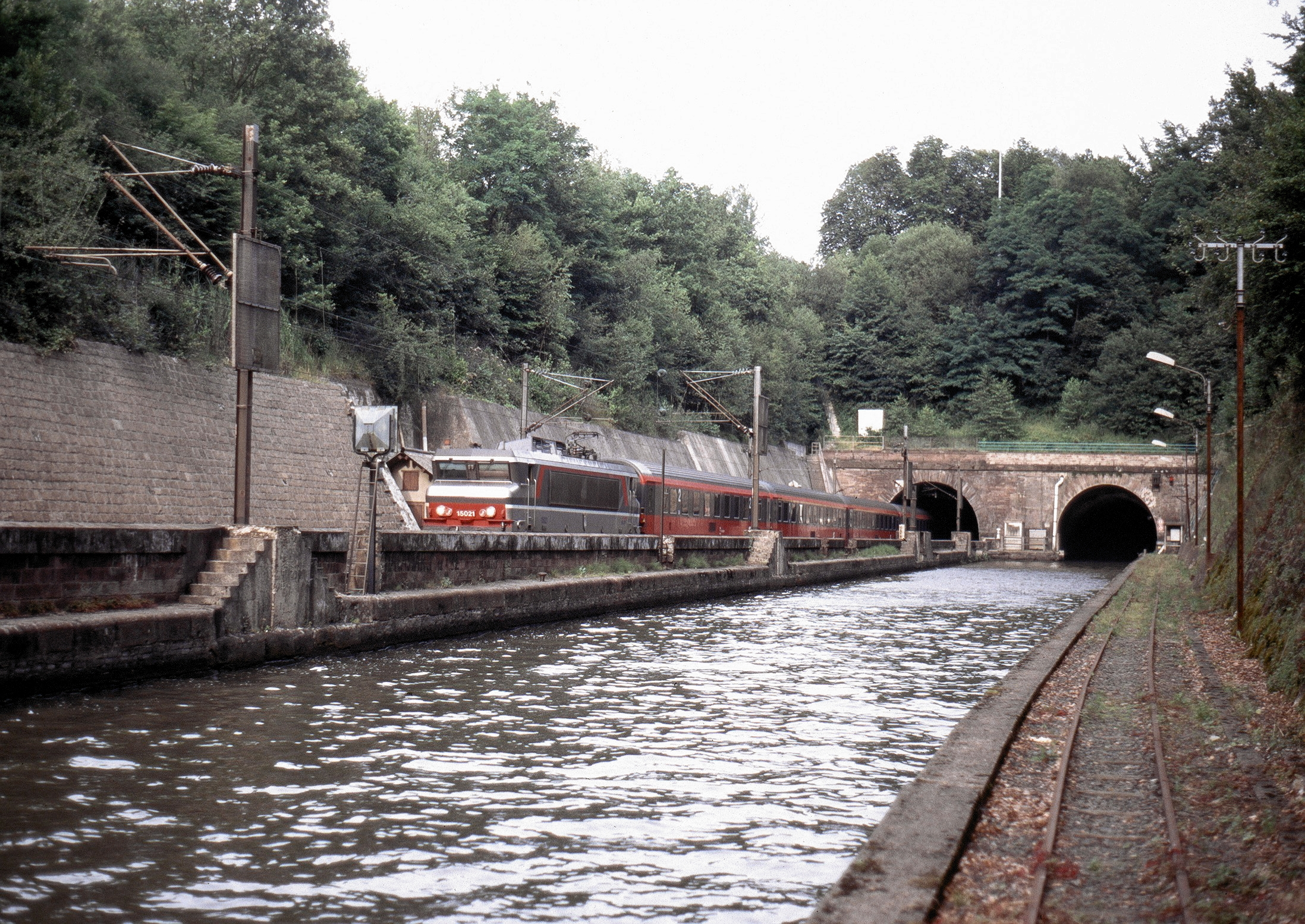
- Tunnel of the Marne-Rhine Canal in Arzviller

- Coat of arms
- Location of Arzviller
- Location within France Location within Grand Est
- Coordinates: 48°43′13″N 7°09′58″E
- Country: France
- Region: Grand Est
- Department: Moselle
- Arrondissement: Sarrebourg-Château-Salins
- Canton: Phalsbourg
- Intercommunality: CC Pays Phalsbourg

Government
  - Mayor (2020–2026): Philippe Schott
- Area^{1}: 5.21 km^{2} (2.01 sq mi)
- Elevation: 320 m (1,050 ft)
- Highest elevation: 354 m (1,161 ft)
- Lowest elevation: 273 m (896 ft)
- Population (2023): 516
  - Density: 99.0/km^{2} (257/sq mi)
- Time zone: UTC+01:00 (CET)
  - Summer (DST): UTC+02:00 (CEST)
- INSEE/Postal code: 57033 /57405
- ^{1} French Land Register data, which excludes lakes, ponds, glaciers > 1 km^{2} (0.386 sq mi or 247 acres) and river estuaries.

Arzviller (French pronunciation: [aʁzvilɛʁ]; German: Arzweiler) is a commune in the Moselle department in Grand Est in northeastern France.

Its particularity lies in its Franco-German influences and its Germanic dialect, which make it, along with the other villages in the region, a cultural exception.

== Geography ==
Arzviller is located in the historic region of Lorraine and is part of the pays de Sarrebourg.

The village is close to the Saint-Louis-Arzviller inclined plane and the rock of Dabo. It is an hour's drive from Strasbourg, Nancy and Metz thanks to its proximity to the A4 highway and the RN4.

== Population ==
Historical population
Year	Pop.	±% p.a.
1968	507	—
1975	486	−0.60%
1982	544	+1.62%
1990	508	−0.85%
1999	516	+0.17%
2007	521	+0.12%
2012	551	+1.13%
2017	535	−0.59%
2023	516	−0.60%
Source: INSEE

== Cultural events and festivities ==
Throughout the year, Arzviller is animated by the St. John's Eve celebrations, the messti, the Christmas market and many other cultural and sporting events.

== See also ==
- Saint-Louis-Arzviller inclined plane
- Communes of the Moselle department
