= Dolving =

- Commune
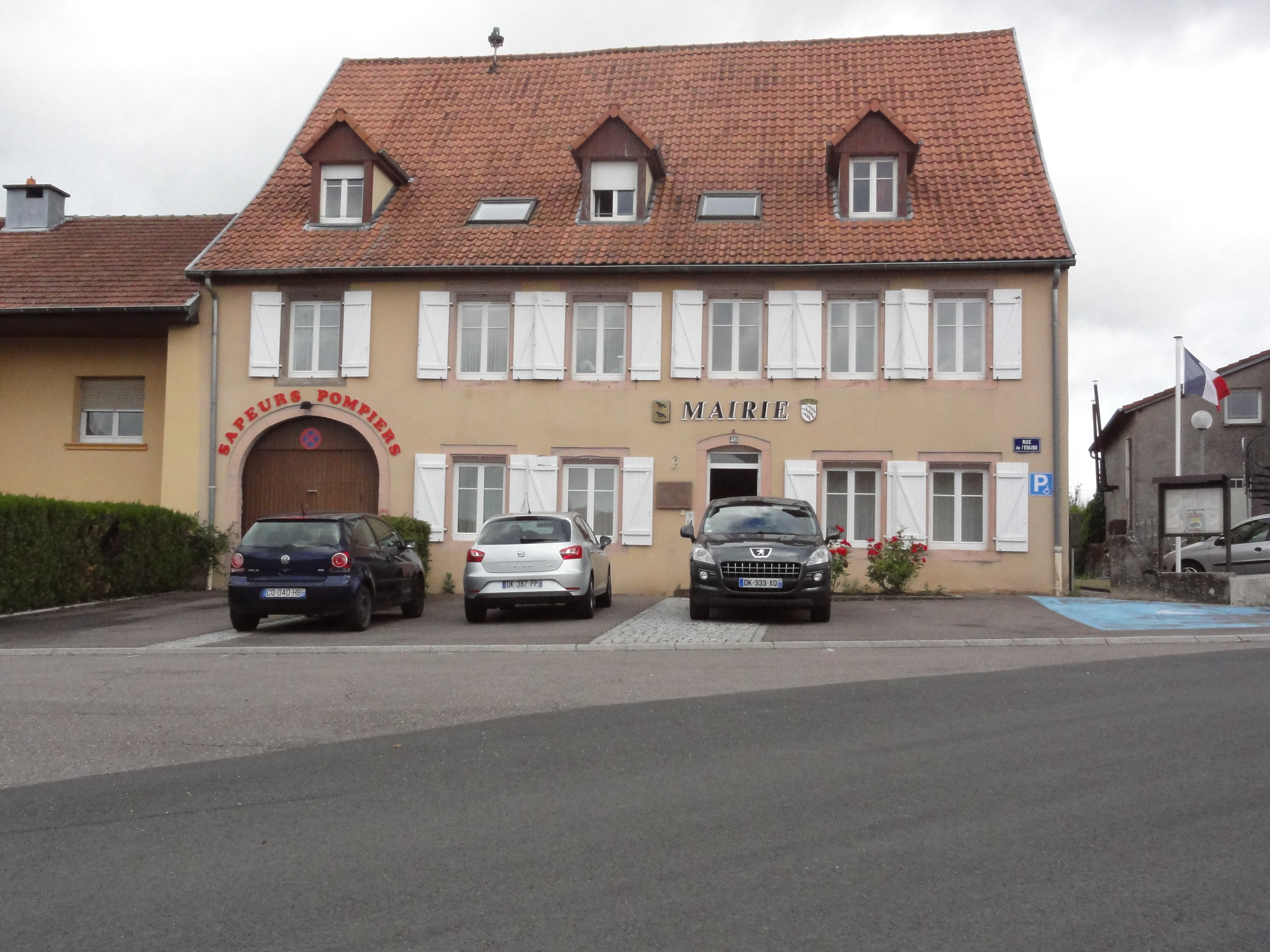
- The town hall in Dolving

- Coat of arms
- Location of Dolving
- Location within France Location within Grand Est
- Coordinates: 48°46′34″N 7°01′16″E
- Country: France
- Region: Grand Est
- Department: Moselle
- Arrondissement: Sarrebourg-Château-Salins
- Canton: Sarrebourg
- Intercommunality: Sarrebourg - Moselle Sud

Government
  - Mayor (2020–2026): Antoine Littner
- Area^{1}: 6.66 km^{2} (2.57 sq mi)
- Elevation: 300 m (980 ft)
- Highest elevation: 313 m (1,027 ft)
- Lowest elevation: 237 m (778 ft)
- Population (2023): 344
  - Density: 51.7/km^{2} (134/sq mi)
- Time zone: UTC+01:00 (CET)
  - Summer (DST): UTC+02:00 (CEST)
- INSEE/Postal code: 57180 /57400
- ^{1} French Land Register data, which excludes lakes, ponds, glaciers > 1 km^{2} (0.386 sq mi or 247 acres) and river estuaries.

Dolving (French pronunciation: [dɔlvɛ̃]; German: Dolvingen) is a commune in the Moselle department in Grand Est in north-eastern France.

== See also ==
- Communes of the Moselle department
