= Hultehouse =

- Commune
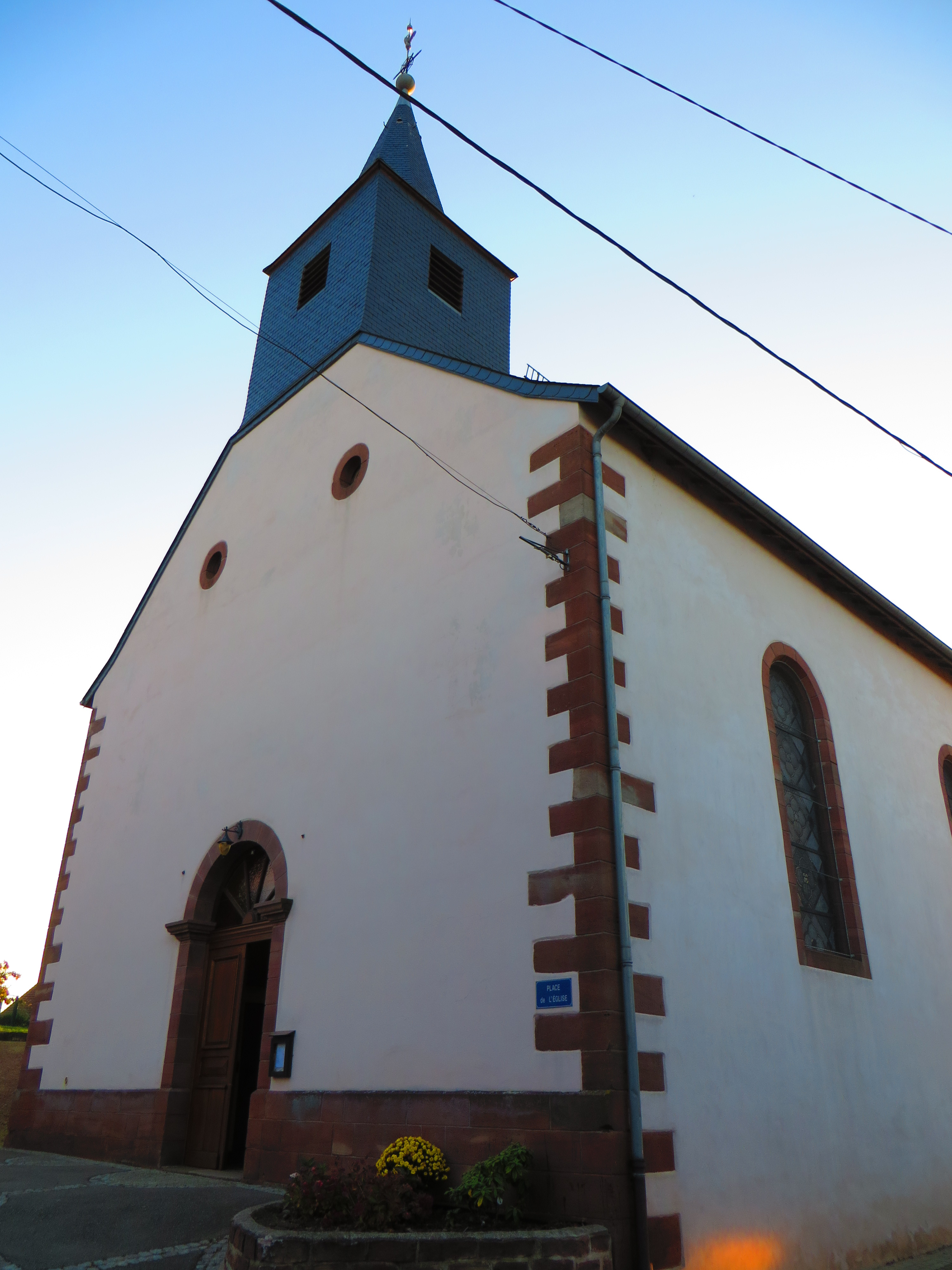
- The church in Hultehouse

- Coat of arms
- Location of Hultehouse
- Location within France Location within Grand Est
- Coordinates: 48°43′11″N 7°15′42″E
- Country: France
- Region: Grand Est
- Department: Moselle
- Arrondissement: Sarrebourg-Château-Salins
- Canton: Phalsbourg
- Intercommunality: CC du Pays de Phalsbourg

Government
  - Mayor (2020–2026): Philippe Mouton
- Area^{1}: 4.58 km^{2} (1.77 sq mi)
- Elevation: 400 m (1,300 ft)
- Highest elevation: 463 m (1,519 ft)
- Lowest elevation: 205 m (673 ft)
- Population (2023): 360
  - Density: 79/km^{2} (200/sq mi)
- Time zone: UTC+01:00 (CET)
  - Summer (DST): UTC+02:00 (CEST)
- INSEE/Postal code: 57339 /57820
- ^{1} French Land Register data, which excludes lakes, ponds, glaciers > 1 km^{2} (0.386 sq mi or 247 acres) and river estuaries.

Hultehouse (1801: Hultenhausen; German: Hültenhausen) is a commune in the Moselle department in Grand Est in north-eastern France.

== See also ==
- Communes of the Moselle department
