= Hilbesheim =

- Commune
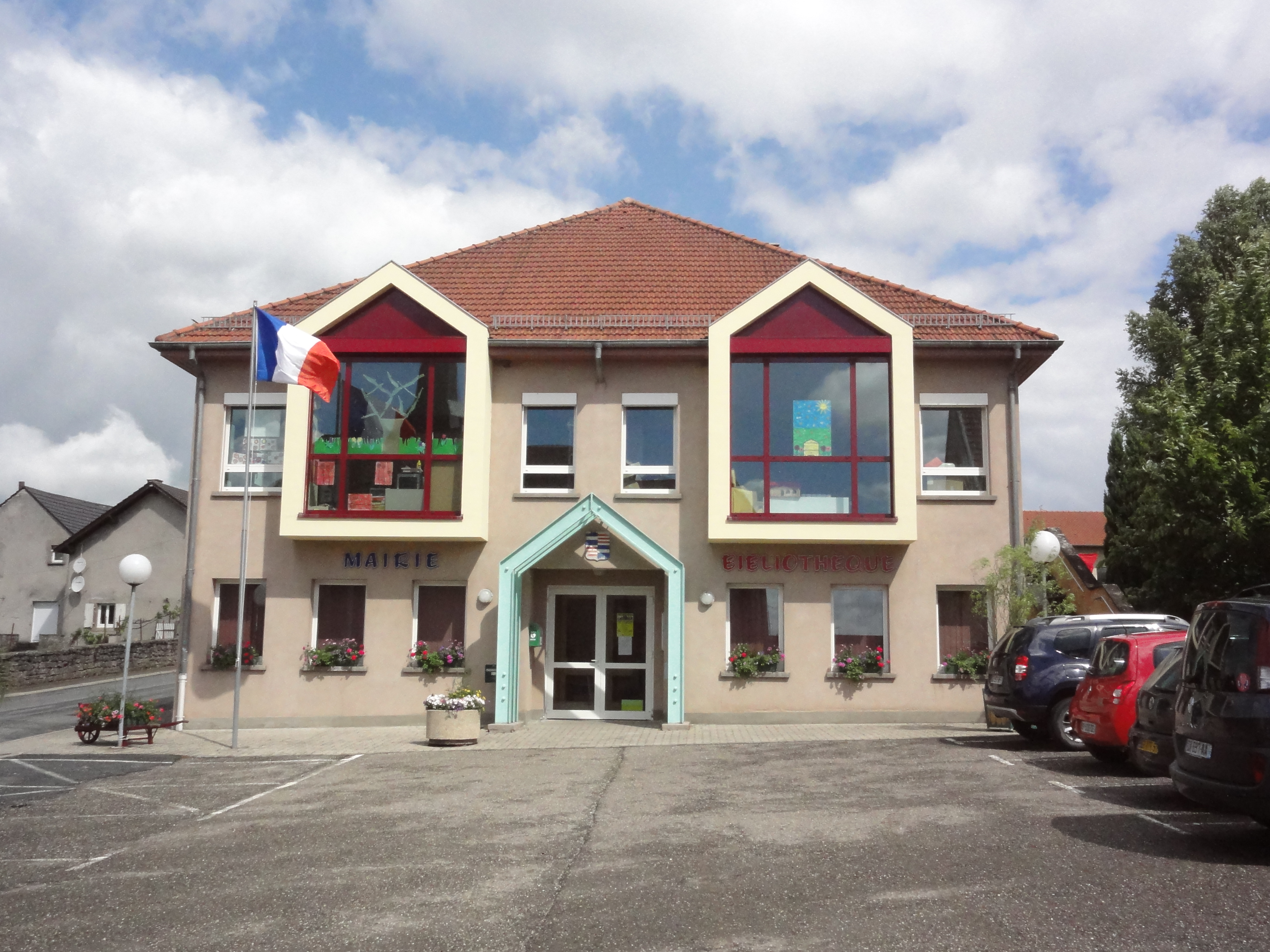
- The town hall and library in Hilbesheim

- Coat of arms
- Location of Hilbesheim
- Location within France Location within Grand Est
- Coordinates: 48°46′39″N 7°05′49″E
- Country: France
- Region: Grand Est
- Department: Moselle
- Arrondissement: Sarrebourg-Château-Salins
- Canton: Sarrebourg
- Intercommunality: Sarrebourg - Moselle Sud

Government
  - Mayor (2020–2026): Jean-Marc Mazerand
- Area^{1}: 7.52 km^{2} (2.90 sq mi)
- Elevation: 325 m (1,066 ft)
- Highest elevation: 337 m (1,106 ft)
- Lowest elevation: 257 m (843 ft)
- Population (2023): 617
  - Density: 82.0/km^{2} (213/sq mi)
- Time zone: UTC+01:00 (CET)
  - Summer (DST): UTC+02:00 (CEST)
- INSEE/Postal code: 57324 /57400
- ^{1} French Land Register data, which excludes lakes, ponds, glaciers > 1 km^{2} (0.386 sq mi or 247 acres) and river estuaries.

Hilbesheim (French pronunciation: [ilbəsaim]; German: Hilbesheim) is a commune in the Moselle department in Grand Est in north-eastern France.

== See also ==
- Communes of the Moselle department
