= Oberstinzel =

- Commune
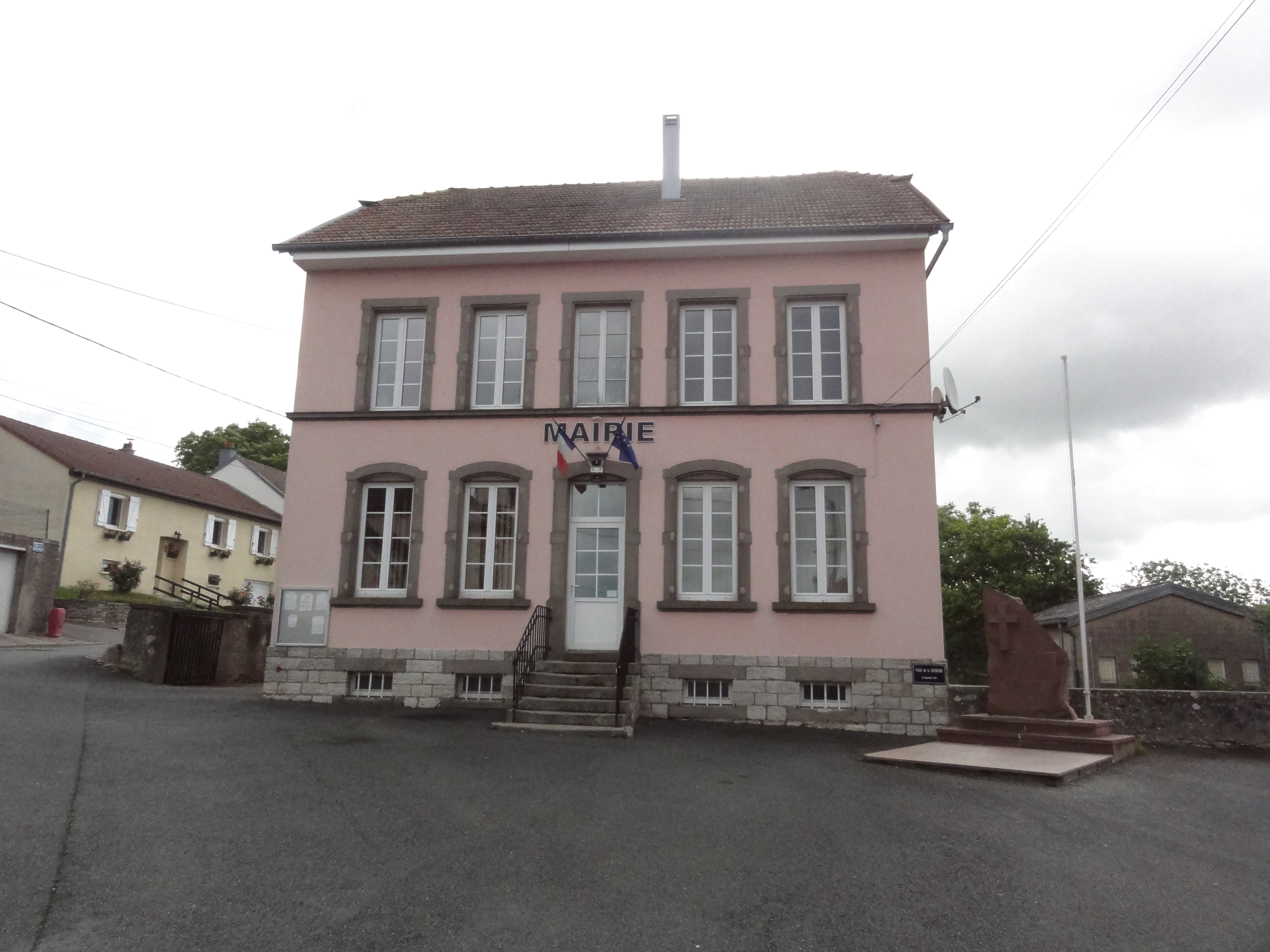
- The town hall in Oberstinzel

- Coat of arms
- Location of Oberstinzel
- Location within France Location within Grand Est
- Coordinates: 48°47′42″N 7°02′06″E
- Country: France
- Region: Grand Est
- Department: Moselle
- Arrondissement: Sarrebourg-Château-Salins
- Canton: Sarrebourg
- Intercommunality: Sarrebourg - Moselle Sud

Government
  - Mayor (2020–2026): Clement Boudinet
- Area^{1}: 5.07 km^{2} (1.96 sq mi)
- Elevation: 280 m (920 ft)
- Highest elevation: 323 m (1,060 ft)
- Lowest elevation: 232 m (761 ft)
- Population (2023): 316
  - Density: 62.3/km^{2} (161/sq mi)
- Time zone: UTC+01:00 (CET)
  - Summer (DST): UTC+02:00 (CEST)
- INSEE/Postal code: 57518 /57930
- ^{1} French Land Register data, which excludes lakes, ponds, glaciers > 1 km^{2} (0.386 sq mi or 247 acres) and river estuaries.

Oberstinzel is a commune in the Moselle department in Grand Est in north-eastern France. The similarly named commune Niederstinzel lies 8 km to the north.

== See also ==
- Communes of the Moselle department
