= Lutzelbourg =

- Commune
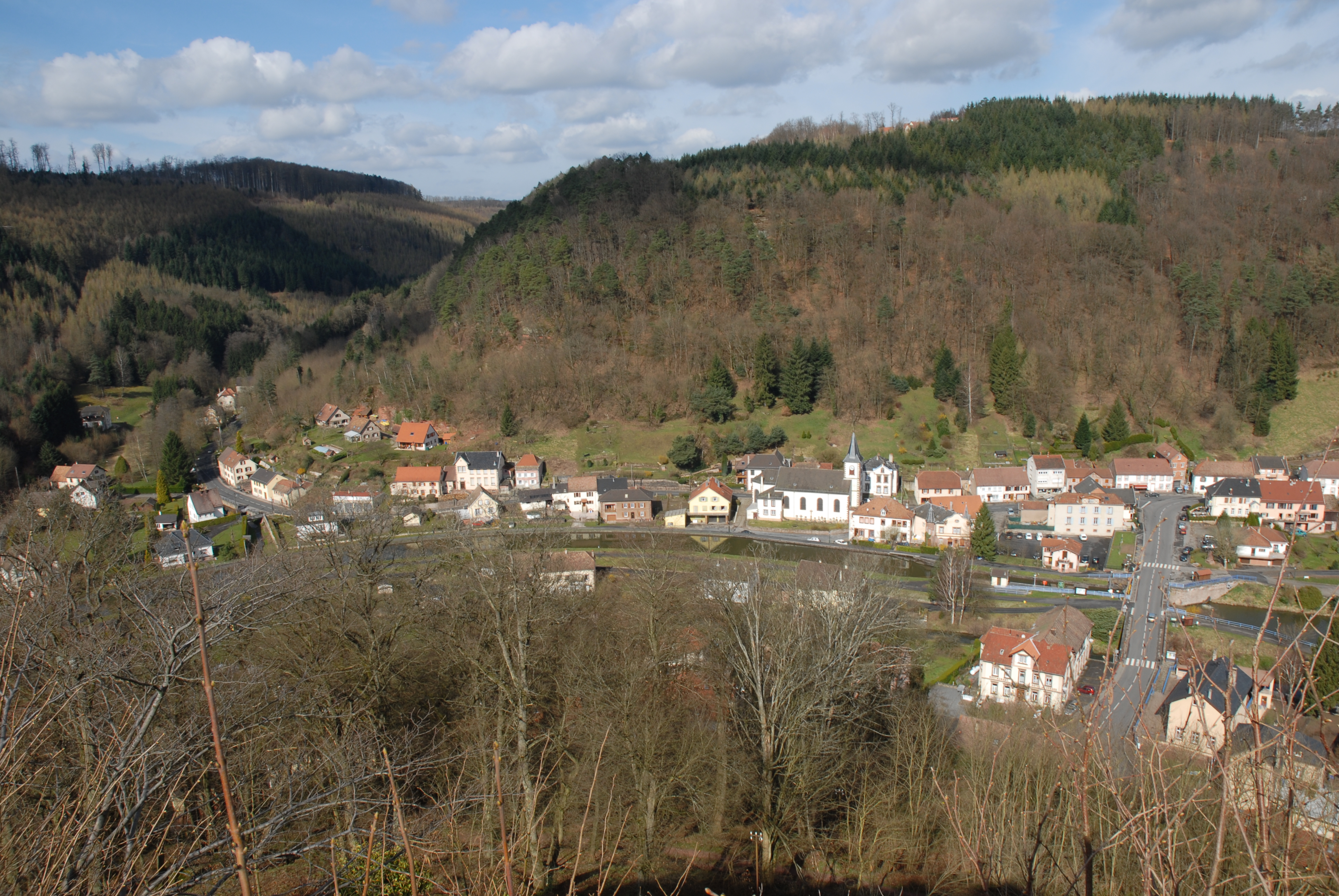
- A general view of Lutzelbourg

- Coat of arms
- Location of Lutzelbourg
- Location within France Location within Grand Est
- Coordinates: 48°44′07″N 7°15′07″E
- Country: France
- Region: Grand Est
- Department: Moselle
- Arrondissement: Sarrebourg-Château-Salins
- Canton: Phalsbourg
- Intercommunality: CC du Pays de Phalsbourg

Government
  - Mayor (2020–2026): Grégoire Perry
- Area^{1}: 5.84 km^{2} (2.25 sq mi)
- Elevation: 225 m (738 ft)
- Highest elevation: 397 m (1,302 ft)
- Lowest elevation: 205 m (673 ft)
- Population (2023): 551
  - Density: 94.3/km^{2} (244/sq mi)
- Time zone: UTC+01:00 (CET)
  - Summer (DST): UTC+02:00 (CEST)
- INSEE/Postal code: 57427 /57820
- ^{1} French Land Register data, which excludes lakes, ponds, glaciers > 1 km^{2} (0.386 sq mi or 247 acres) and river estuaries.

Lutzelbourg (French pronunciation: [lytsəlbuʁ]; German: Lützelburg) is a commune in the Moselle department in Grand Est in north-eastern France. This town is located in the historic region of Lorraine and is part of the country of Sarrebourg.

Its inhabitants are called the Lutzelbourgeois. It is located on the Marne-Rhine Canal.

== Geography ==
Crossed by the Marne-Rhine canal, the town of Lutzelbourg is located 3.5 km from Phalsbourg, 10 km from Saverne and 4 km from the inclined plane of Saint-Louis-Arzviller. The village is surrounded by four hills.

Lutzelbourg station is on the Line from Paris-Est to Strasbourg-Ville and was the origin of the old Line from Lutzelbourg to Drulingen, now downgraded and deposited.

The cycle path along the Marne-Rhine canal leads to Saverne, Strasbourg or Sarrebourg.

Twinning of towns between Lutzelbourg / Moselle and Lützelburg (Gablingen) / Bavaria. For about 20 years, a partnership has taken the form of regular meetings.

== Toponymy ==
The name can be broken down into two terms in Middle High German: "lützel", namely "small", and "Burg", namely "fortified place, castle" (although this gave the term "bourg" in French with a completely different meaning). Finally, the name translates to "small fortification". It is the same etymology as that of the city of Luxembourg which is always called Lëtzebuerg in Luxembourgish.

== History ==
- In the 12th century, the seigneury came under the bishop of Metz.
- The stronghold was besieged and destroyed by the Duke of Lorraine in 1151.
- In the 16th century, the castle had become a den of brigands; it was ruined during the fighting between the Count of Hanau and Franz von Sickingen in 1523.
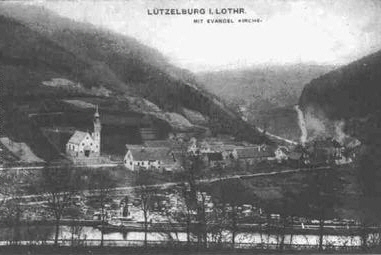
View of the village with the Lutheran church, early 20th century.

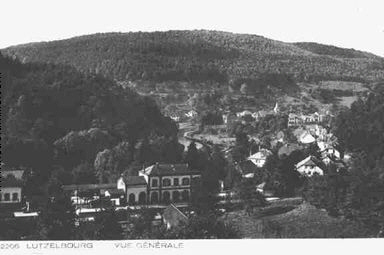
View of the village with the train station, early 20th century.

=== Second World War ===
Coming from Metz, Adolf Hitler, Chancellor of the Reich, came to Lutzelbourg on 26 December 1940, where he was received at the Hôtel des Vosges, for a Christmas Eve, in the presence of the troops from the sector. The armored train, parked in the Arzviller railway tunnel, was waiting for the "Führer" at 6:40 pm for the return to Berlin, where he arrived the next morning.

== Local culture and heritage ==
=== Places and monuments ===
==== Civil buildings ====
- Remains of an ancient farm;
- Traces of a Roman tower;
- Port de plaisance;
- Castle of Lutzelbourg;
- Plan incliné de Saint-Louis-Arzviller (à 4 km).

==== Religious buildings ====
- Church Saint-Michel (18th century), enlarged 1834 1869;
- Lutheran Church, rue de Phalsbourg built between 1907 and 1909.
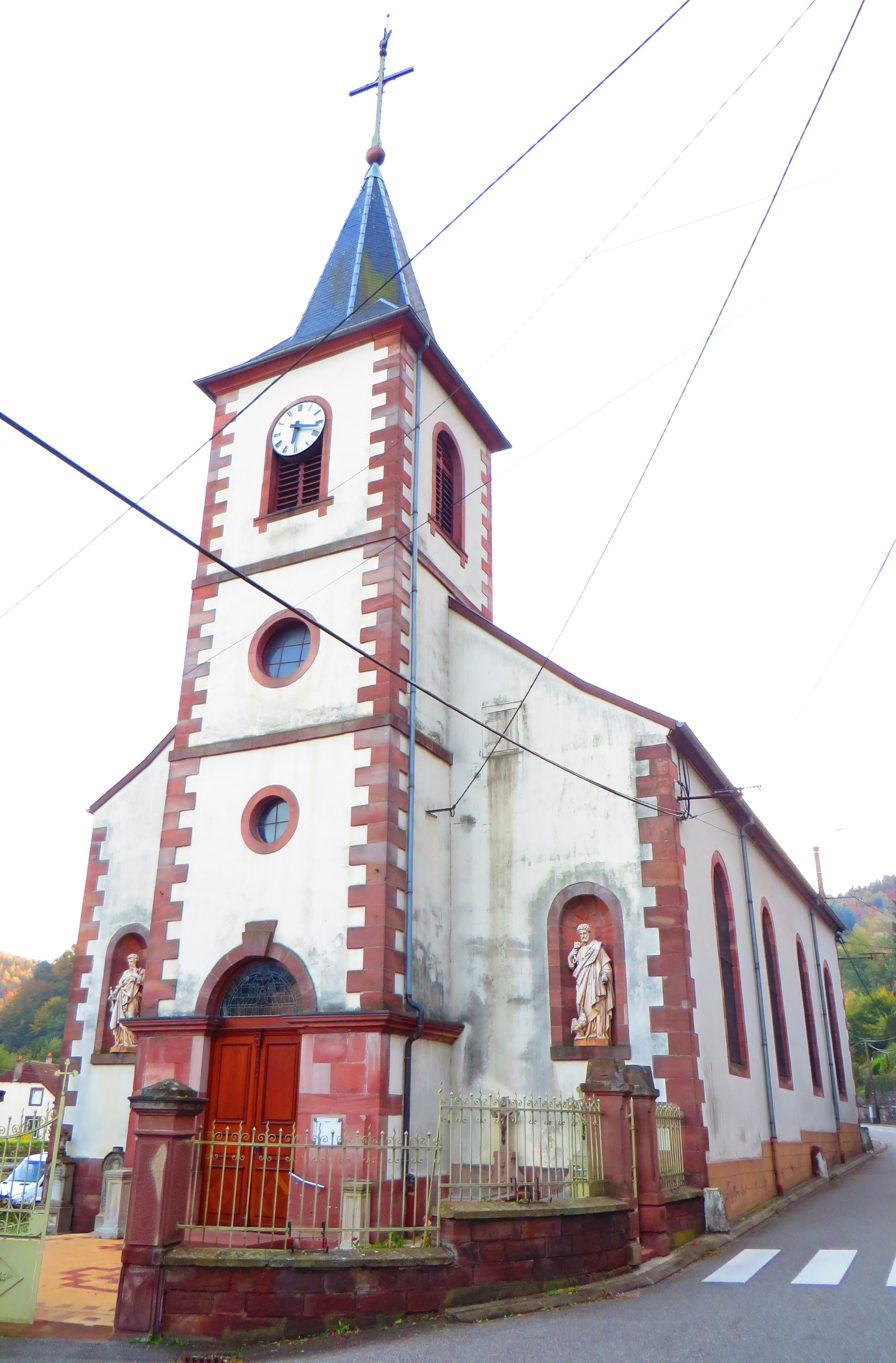
Church Saint-Michel.

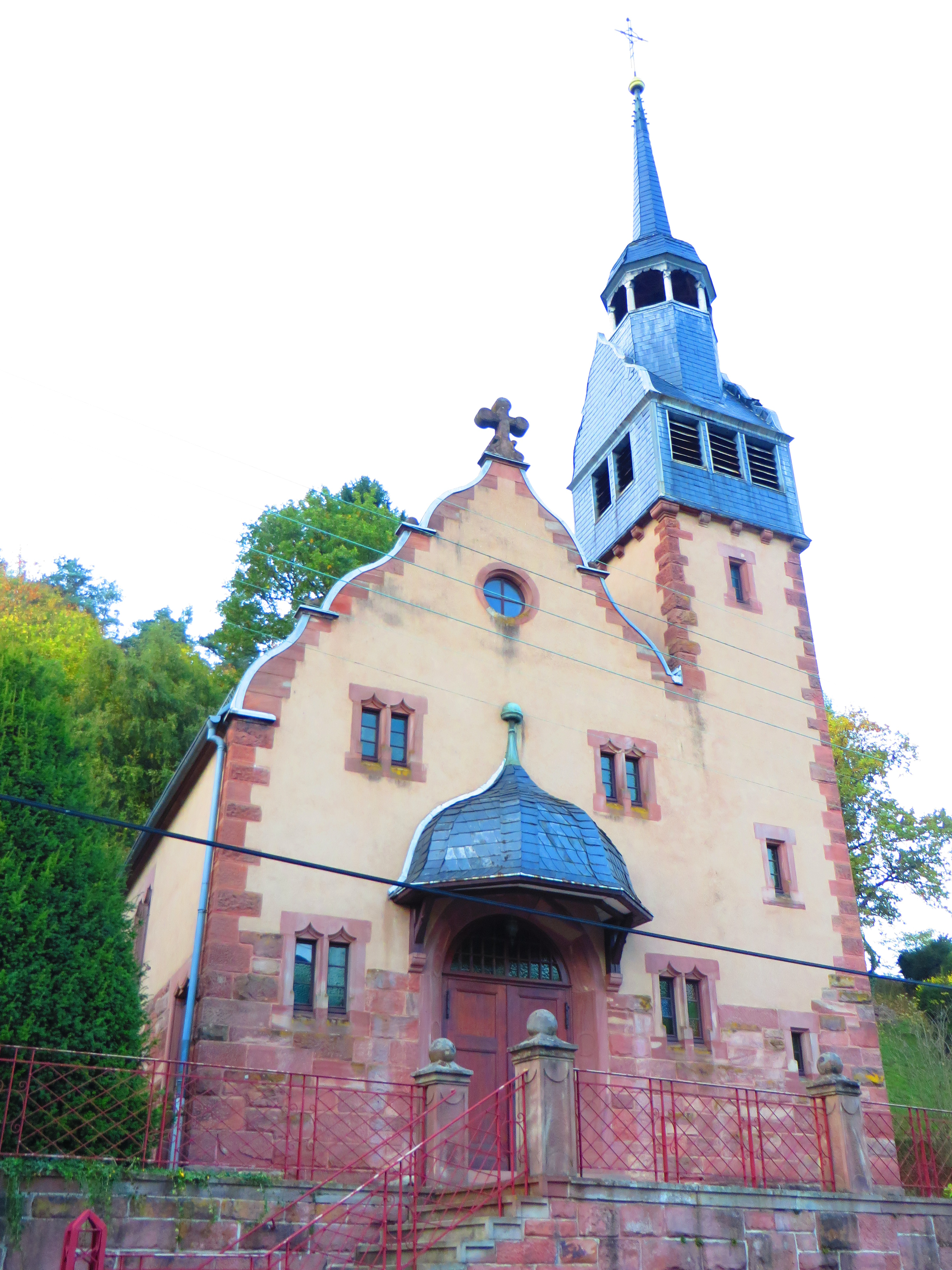
Lutheran Church.

=== Personalities linked to the municipality ===
- In 1900, Eugène Koeberlé bought the castle to consolidate it, carry out archaeological excavations and restore it.

== See also ==
- Communes of the Moselle department
