= Raon-sur-Plaine =

- Commune
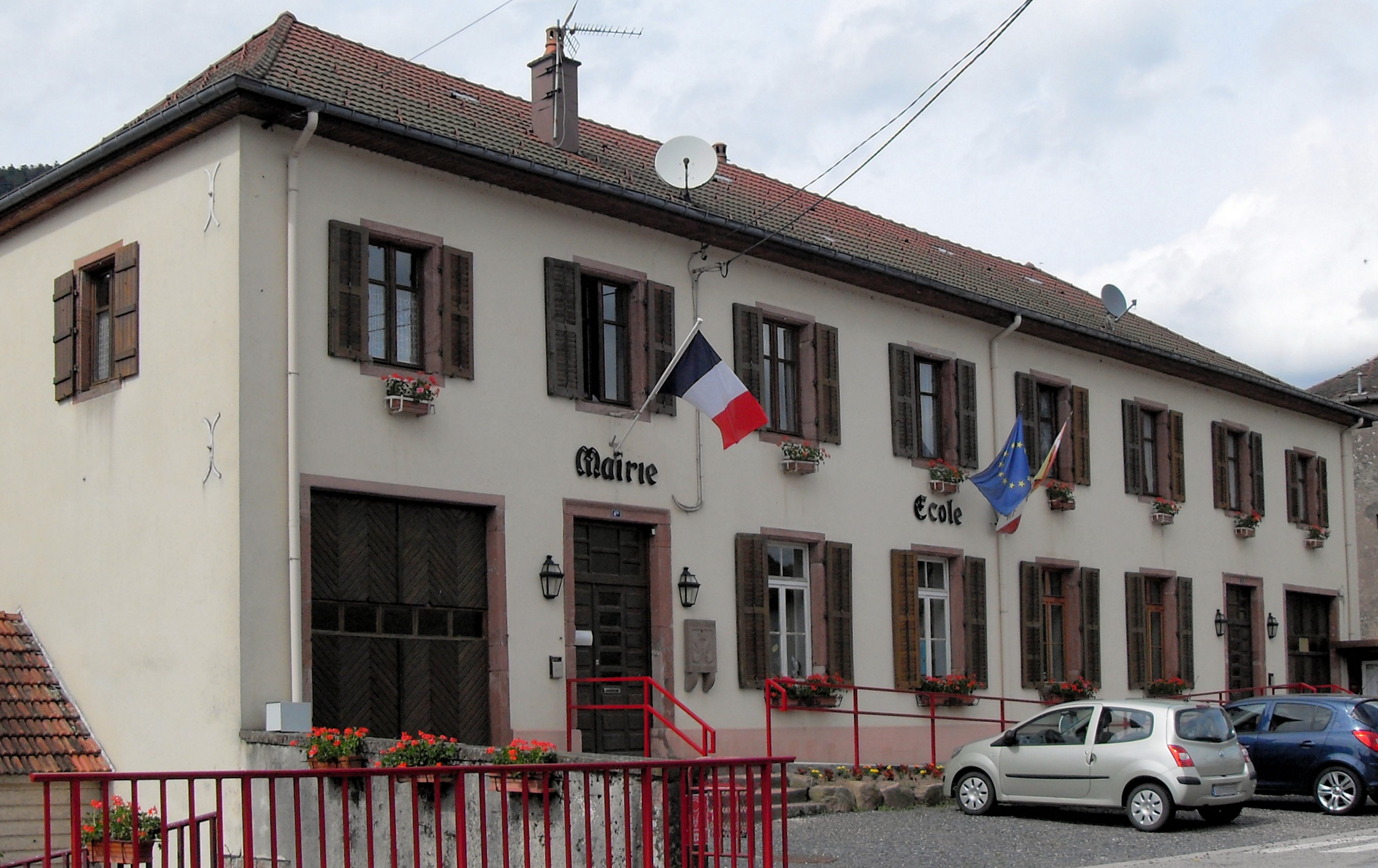
- The town hall and school in Raon-sur-Plaine

- Coat of arms
- Location of Raon-sur-Plaine
- Location within France Location within Grand Est
- Coordinates: 48°30′43″N 7°05′51″E
- Country: France
- Region: Grand Est
- Department: Vosges
- Arrondissement: Saint-Dié-des-Vosges
- Canton: Raon-l'Étape
- Intercommunality: CA Saint-Dié-des-Vosges

Government
  - Mayor (2020–2026): Denis Henry
- Area^{1}: 3.54 km^{2} (1.37 sq mi)
- Elevation: 430 m (1,410 ft)
- Highest elevation: 744 m (2,441 ft)
- Lowest elevation: 405 m (1,329 ft)
- Population (2023): 135
  - Density: 38.1/km^{2} (98.8/sq mi)
- Time zone: UTC+01:00 (CET)
  - Summer (DST): UTC+02:00 (CEST)
- INSEE/Postal code: 88373 /88110
- ^{1} French Land Register data, which excludes lakes, ponds, glaciers > 1 km^{2} (0.386 sq mi or 247 acres) and river estuaries.

Raon-sur-Plaine (French pronunciation: [ʁaɔ̃ syʁ plɛn]) is a commune in the Vosges department in Grand Est in northeastern France. Inhabitants are known as Raonnais.

== Geography ==
Raon-sur-Plaine is positioned in the Celles Valley, 3 kilometres (2 mi) to the west of the highest point of the North Vosges Mountains, the Donon Peak. The valley is a classic V-shaped one, followed by the River Plaine which here follows a relatively indirect course.

Sited at an average altitude of 430 meters, the little village is surrounded by a number of hills, such as the Hazelle and the Charaille, and contains several mountain streams such as the Goudiot streams.

The vegetation is dominated by conifer forests which historically have been a source of wealth.

The climate is 'continental' which means, by the standards of central France, cold winters, but warm summers, supported by relatively high levels of precipitation.

The layout of the village is broadly linear, set along the route of a former main road linking Lorraine with Strasbourg in Alsace. The road was 'declassified' after 1972, by when alternative routes to the north and south had been upgraded.

The confined nature of the valley and the mountainous terraine enforce a compact layout for the village itself. The mountain topography also enforces a collaborative approach to agriculture: it is no coincidence that the mayor since 2001 has been a member of the (by Anglo-American criteria) pragmatic French Communist Party.

== History ==
It is believed that Celts, Gauls and Romans inhabited the valley long before the arrival of Christian monks. Records indicate that around 640 St Gondelbert founded the Benedictine monastery at Senones. The monks rapidly cleared the valley sufficiently to extend the settled land beyond Raon as far as Mount Donon, also including Lake Maix and the valley of the Bruche. The extent of this settlement approximately defines the territory that centuries later became the Principality of Salm-Salm after the settlement of 1751.

From the eighth century, the abbey took to inviting chosen "devout" and powerful individuals (les "voués") nominated by the powerful Bishops of Metz, to attend to defending its lands. This the first time one comes across mention of the name Salm in connection with the territory. Towards the end of the eleventh century the territory acquired a more assertive protector in the form of Count Herman II. Arriving at the abbey as its protector, he managed to take over its temporal powers by a sort of coup d'état. However, the next year the marriage of Herman's daughter, Christine of Salm signalled the dividing of the county between Herman's son, Henry and Christine who through her marriage transferred that part of the territory on the other side of the Plaine River to what would become a separate branch of the family. A new village grew up on the opposite bank of the river in the form of Raon-lès-Leau which now, thanks to events in the second half of the nineteenth century, is not even in the same département as Raon-sur-Plaine.

Through and beyond the later medieval period, the history of the villages in the valley dominated by Celles-sur-Plaine was effectively the history of Salm-Salm. After the French Revolution the territory was 'voluntarily' attached to France after the revolutionary army blocked the valley and the inhabitants ran out of food. Under the revolutionary settlement, Raon-sur-Plaine found itself in the canton of Allarmont. Under Napoleon I the administrative map of France was extensively reworked and in 1805 Raon was incorporated into the commune of Schirmeck, which at this stage was still part of the Vosges département.

In 1871, following the French defeat in the Franco-Prussian War and the signing of the Treaty of Frankfurt, Raon-sur-Plaine and its close neighbour Raon-lès-Leau were initially annexed by Prussia, along with the rest of Alsace-Lorraine. However, due to repetitive protests from the local population, the two villages were soon returned to France, but not without the loss of most of their surrounding forests, which the Germans intended to keep as a glacis for the defensive position of Mount Donon. These terms were accepted by the French government which was desperately trying and more focused on retaining territorial control of a private railway line at Avricourt. Opinions vary as to which nation state benefited from this last minute revision of the Treaty of Frankfurt, but for the villagers stripped of most of their rich forests, the deal was poor. Local discontent was perpetuated after 1919 and 1945 when France found itself on the winning side of both World Wars against Germany, but Paris decided against restoring the borders from before the Franco-Prussian War. Most of the woodland which before 1871 belonged to Raon-sur-Plaine and Raon-lès-Leau an thus to Lorraine therefore remains, since that date, a part of Grandfontaine in Alsace.

== See also ==
- Communes of the Vosges department
