= Raon-lès-Leau =

- Commune
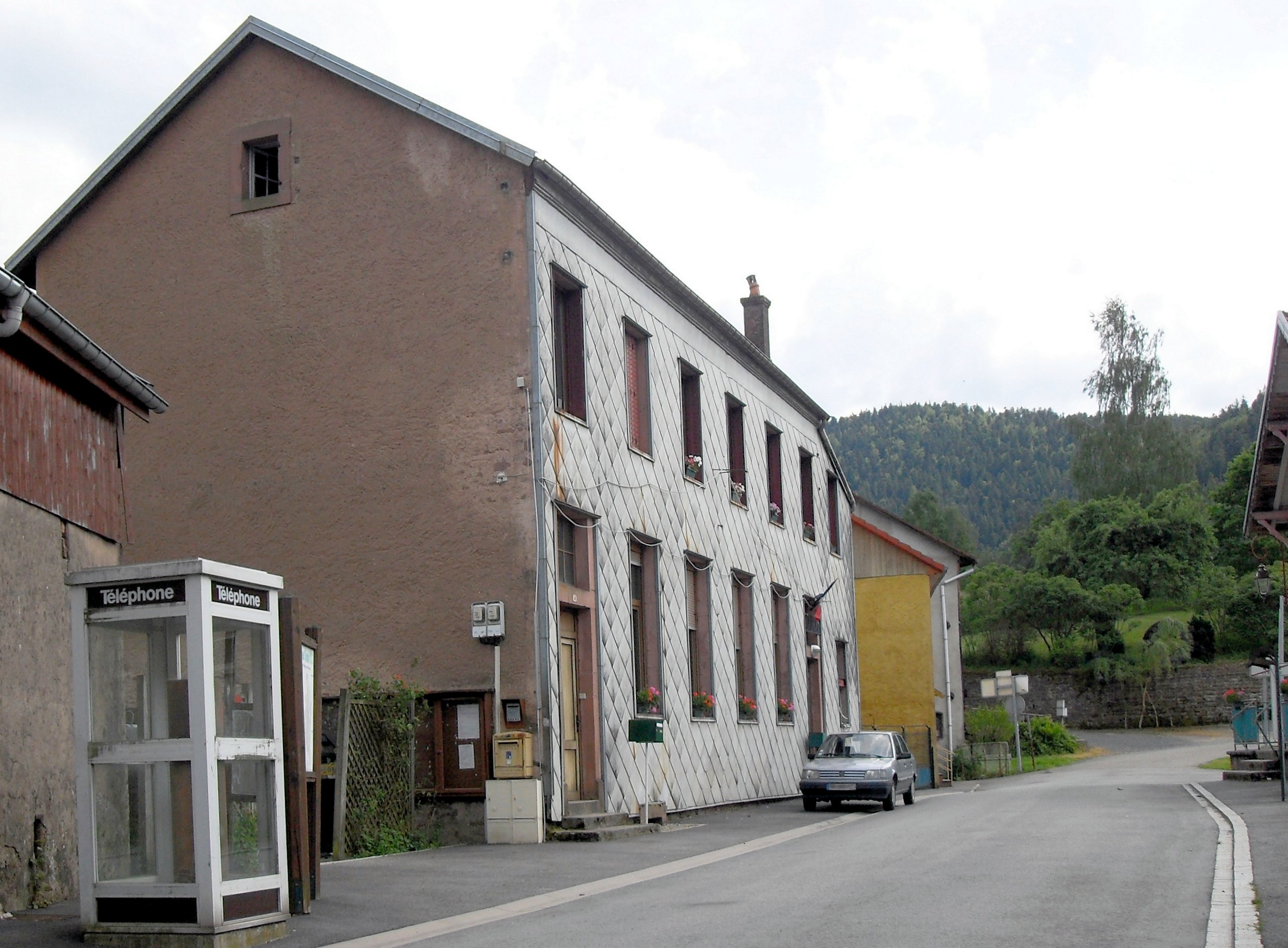
- The town hall and school in Raon-lès-Leau

- Coat of arms
- Location of Raon-lès-Leau
- Location within France Location within Grand Est
- Coordinates: 48°30′50″N 7°05′41″E
- Country: France
- Region: Grand Est
- Department: Meurthe-et-Moselle
- Arrondissement: Lunéville
- Canton: Baccarat
- Intercommunality: CA Saint-Dié-des-Vosges

Government
  - Mayor (2020–2026): Étienne Meire
- Area^{1}: 1.31 km^{2} (0.51 sq mi)
- Elevation: 440 m (1,440 ft)
- Highest elevation: 550 m (1,800 ft)
- Lowest elevation: 411 m (1,348 ft)
- Population (2023): 40
  - Density: 31/km^{2} (79/sq mi)
- Time zone: UTC+01:00 (CET)
  - Summer (DST): UTC+02:00 (CEST)
- INSEE/Postal code: 54443 /54540
- ^{1} French Land Register data, which excludes lakes, ponds, glaciers > 1 km^{2} (0.386 sq mi or 247 acres) and river estuaries.

Raon-lès-Leau (French pronunciation: [ʁaɔ̃ lɛ lo]) is a commune in the Meurthe-et-Moselle department in north-eastern France.

== History ==
In 1871, following the French defeat in the Franco-Prussian War and the signing of the Treaty of Frankfurt, Raon-lès-Leau and its close neighbour Raon-sur-Plaine were initially annexed by Prussia, along with the rest of Alsace-Lorraine. However, due to repetitive protests from the local population, the two villages were soon returned to France, but not without the loss of most of their surrounding forests, which the Germans intended to keep as a glacis for the defensive position of Mont Donon. These terms were accepted by the French government which was desperately trying and more focused on retaining territorial control of a private railway line at Avricourt. Opinions vary as to which nation state benefited from this last minute revision of the Treaty of Frankfurt, but for the villagers stripped of most of their rich forests, the deal was poor. Local discontent was perpetuated after 1919 and 1945 when France found itself on the winning side of both World Wars against Germany, but Paris decided against restoring the borders from before the Franco-Prussian War. Most of the woodland which before 1871 belonged to Raon-sur-Plaine and Raon-lès-Leau an thus to Lorraine therefore remains, since that date, a part of Grandfontaine in Alsace.

== See also ==
- Communes of the Meurthe-et-Moselle department
