= Avricourt =

Avricourt is the name of the following communes in France:

- Avricourt, Meurthe-et-Moselle, in the Meurthe-et-Moselle department
- Avricourt, Moselle, in the Moselle department
- Avricourt, Oise, in the Oise department
