= Grandfontaine, Bas-Rhin =

Grandfontaine Grossbrunn
- Commune
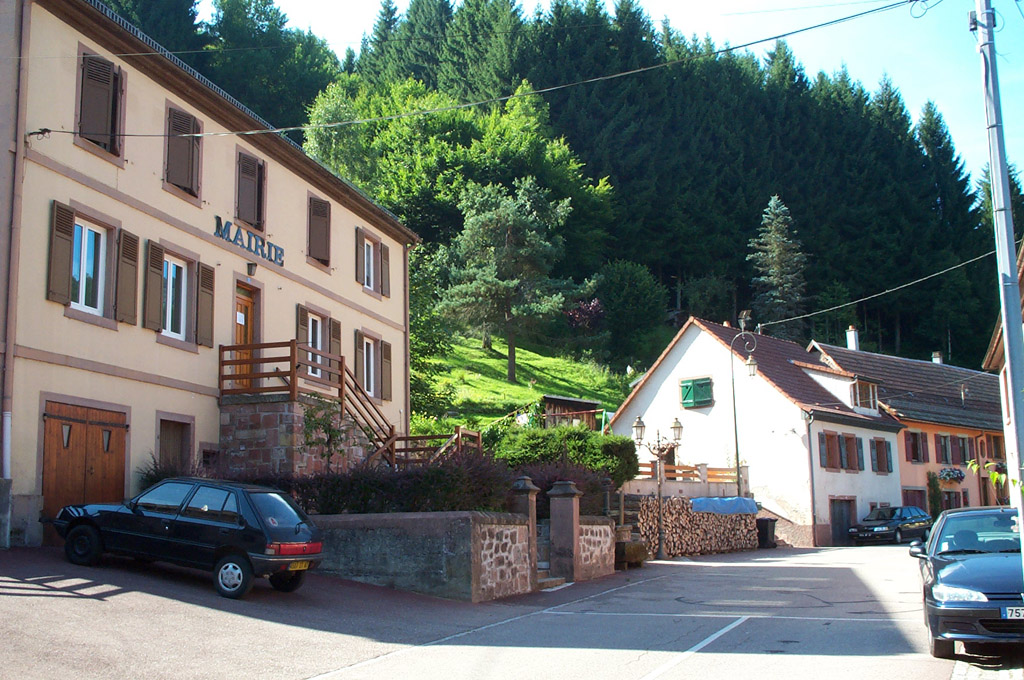
- The town hall in Grandfontaine

- Coat of arms
- Location of Grandfontaine
- Location within France Location within Grand Est
- Coordinates: 48°29′36″N 7°09′42″E
- Country: France
- Region: Grand Est
- Department: Bas-Rhin
- Arrondissement: Molsheim
- Canton: Mutzig

Government
  - Mayor (2020–2026): Philippe Remy
- Area^{1}: 39.52 km^{2} (15.26 sq mi)
- Highest elevation: 1,008 m (3,307 ft)
- Lowest elevation: 390 m (1,280 ft)
- Population (2023): 398
  - Density: 10.1/km^{2} (26.1/sq mi)
- Time zone: UTC+01:00 (CET)
  - Summer (DST): UTC+02:00 (CEST)
- INSEE/Postal code: 67165 /67130
- ^{1} French Land Register data, which excludes lakes, ponds, glaciers > 1 km^{2} (0.386 sq mi or 247 acres) and river estuaries.

Grandfontaine (French pronunciation: [ɡʁɑ̃fɔ̃tɛn]; German: Michelbrunn; Alsatian: Grossbrunn) is a commune in the Bas-Rhin department in Grand Est in north-eastern France. In the German dialect of the region it is called Grosbrun.

== Name ==
For many centuries the names Grandfontaine and Framont were used interchangeably. The name Grandfontaine and its Alsatian equivalent, Grosbrun, both describe an abundant water spring. The name Framont comes from the name of the mountain that overlooks the village, derived from the latinate name Ferratus mons (Iron-rich mountain) recorded in 1261. Today the name Framont is used only for a small site at the bottom of the valley where metal based industries grew up.

== Geography ==
The village is positioned in the south of the Bas-Rhin département and on the departmental boundary with the Moselle département. 40 kilometres (25 mi) west of Molsheim, Grandfontaine stretches out beside several mountain streams which feed into the river Bruche at Schirmeck 5 kilometres (3 mi) to the east. This is a mountain village, with most of the buildings at between 400 and 700 meters above sea level, and the rest of the territory being occupied almost entirely by the forest. Surrounding peaks include the Donon (1008m), the Tête des Blanches Roches (916 m), the Corbeille (899 m), the Maxe (863 m), the Rond Perthuis (849m), the Tête Mathis (838 m) and the Haut de la Charaille (758 m).

Following the boundary changes of 1872 (see below) whereby the land imputed to Alsatian Grandfontaine was expanded to include forests which, formerly, had been part of Lorraine, two rivers that flow through Lorraine, the Plaine and the White Sarre, both have their source in the commune.

By road Grandfontaine is accessible using the departmental road RD 392 which runs from Schirmeck a short distance to the south-east through Grandfontaine to the Donon Pass (718 m) which is where the road leaves Alsace and enters Lorraine. The nearest railway station, at Schirmeck, is on the regional Strasbourg-Molsheim-Saales-Saint-Dié-Épinal line.

=== Adjacent communes ===
Wisches lies to the north-east, Schirmeck to the south-east, Moussey to the south-west, and Vexaincourt, Luvigny, Raon-sur-Plaine and Raon-lès-Leau are all over the mountains to the west. Turquestein-Blancrupt is to the north-west.

== History ==
For a more detailed political history of the district, please refer to the entry on Salm-en-Vosges (currently only available in French).

The history of Grandfontaine is closely linked to the exploitation of the iron deposits in the adjacent hills, which predates written records and probably dates back to antiquity, but was certainly the defining activity of the community during the later Middle Ages and, above all, between the sixteenth and nineteenth centuries. The first surviving mention of the metal extraction arises in connection with the troubled the thirteenth century when the area found itself caught between the expansionist ambitions of the Counts of Salm and the wish of the Bishop of Metz, Jacob of Lorraine, to limit the power of the major secular land owners. The resulting struggles dislocated the metallurgy businesses of "Ferratus Mons" (the Iron Mountain). The industry appears to have been restored by the sixteenth century when mining and the associated iron works reached a hitherto unprecedented scale, marked in the middle of the century by the introduction of modern blast furnaces which were able to last for several years and, weather permitting, produce Cast iron blocks. These more robust and profitable furnaces were introduced to Grandfontaine by Thierry Buron from Varennes-en-Argonne, site of another booming iron business a hundred or so kilometres to the west. The exercise involved transferring a successful technology from the iron works controlled by the Counts of Salm to an iron area on the frontiers of Lorraine and Alsace. The resulting climate of exceptional prosperity together with the monopoly over iron production in the region enjoyed by the Salm family were lost following the destruction inflicted by the Thirty years War, and the subsequent warring between France and The Empire which continued until after the death of Louis XIV, by which time Alsace was becoming accustomed to being part of France.

After 1715, the focus of French expansionism moved increasingly overseas: the death of the Sun King triggered a return to prosperity for the iron foundries of Grandfontaine. Under the dynamic leadership of a new director named Pierre Launay the Forges of Framont quickly regained their reputation: in 1720 the Duke of Lorraine looked no further for the iron castings needed for the construction of his new château at Lunéville. Along with the rest of Alsace, the community experienced a prolonged period of prosperity through the rest of the eighteenth century.

By the middle of the nineteenth century it was becoming more difficult to provide cast iron product of consistent quality, the best veins of ore having by now been exhausted. Recovering the remaining ore became more expensive and the economics of the smelting process were adversely affected by the increasing cost of charcoal. The loss of profitability prompted several attempts to reorganise the business, but the best years were clearly over and on 7 April 1863 the forges were closed.

In 1871 Grandfontaine benefited from a last minute renegotiation following the surrender of Alsace and Lorraine to Germany. France was keen to retain a railway line of which, under the terms originally imposed, six kilometres near Avricourt would have ended up in Germany. The Germans were however persuaded to return the small amount of land involved to France in return for a large area of woodland surrounding the nearby communes of Raon-sur-Plaine and Raon-lès-Leau in Lorraine. The woodland provided excellent scope for profitable forestry and contributed to the prosperity of Grandfontaine (now in Germany). After 1919 and again in 1944, when Alsace and Lorraine were transferred back to France, there was no appetite for returning to the pre-1871 frontier between Alsace and Lorraine: the lucrative forests remain in Alsace and the Grandfontaine commune has retained them, notwithstanding the protests from Raon across the mountains in Lorraine.

== Notable people ==
British author Nicolas Freeling died at his home in Grandfontaine on 20 July 2003.

== Points of interest ==
Les Minières is a nineteenth-century iron ore mine restored to operational status by the local commune, complemented by a small museum retracing the operation of the mine over the centuries and displaying some of mineralogical riches of the region.

== See also ==
- Communes of the Bas-Rhin department

Grandfontaine official website
