= War reparations =

Compensation payments made after a war by one side to the other

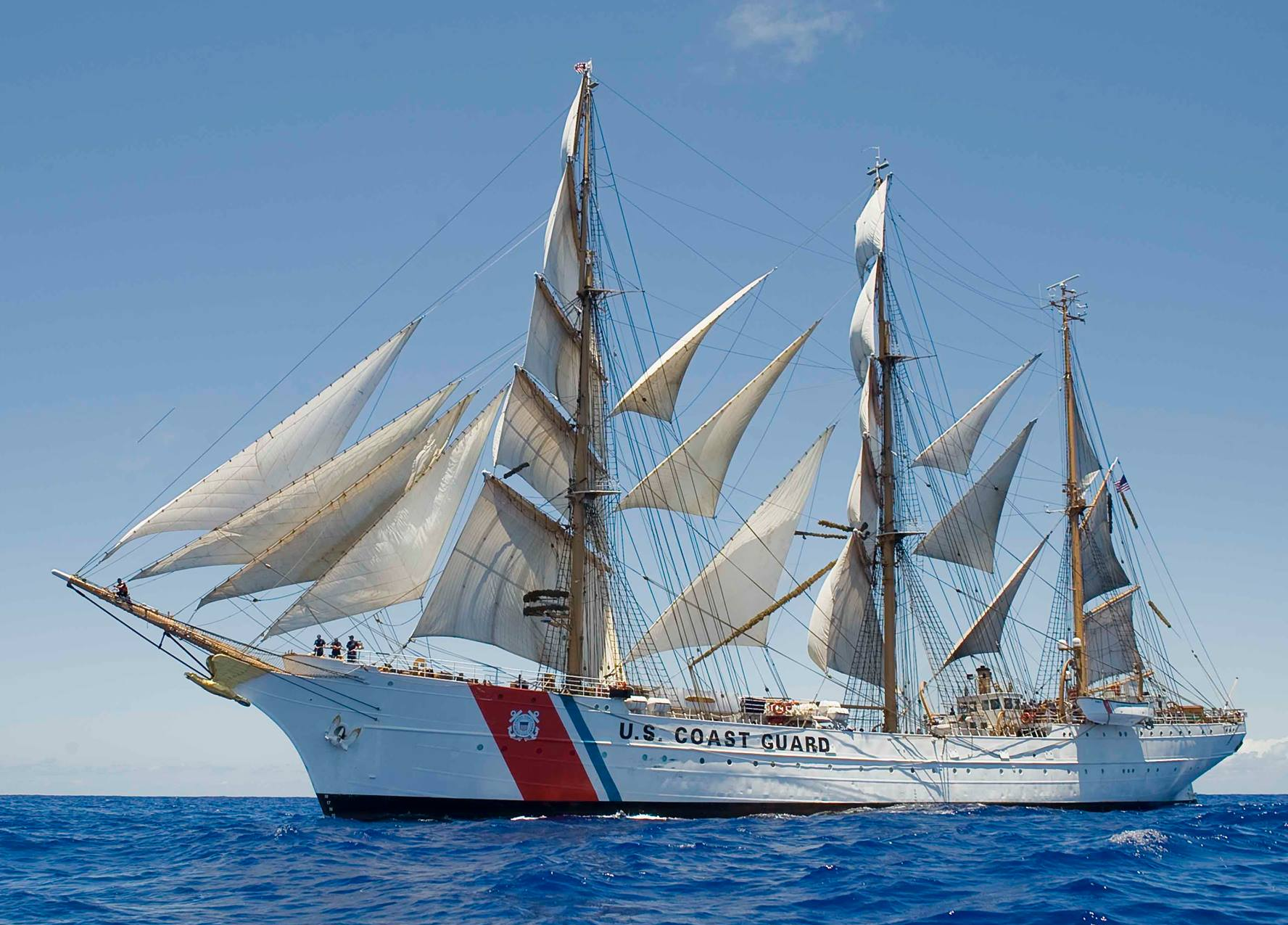
The USCGC Eagle, built in 1936 as Horst Wessel for the German Navy, was taken by the United States as reparations in 1946.

War reparations are compensation payments made after a war by one side to the other. They are intended to cover damage or injury inflicted during a war. War reparations can take the form of hard currency, precious metals, natural resources, industrial assets, or intellectual properties. Loss of territory in a peace settlement is usually considered to be distinct from war reparations.

War reparations are often governed by treaties which belligerent parties negotiate as part of a peace settlement. Payment of reparations often occur as part of a condition to remove occupying troops or under the threat of re-occupation. The legal basis for war reparations in modern international law is Article 3 of the Hague Convention of 1907.

Prominent examples of war reparations include Carthage's indemnity paid to Rome following the First Punic War, French reparations following the Napoleonic Wars, Haiti's reparations to France following the Haitian War of Independence (1791–1804), French reparations to Germany following the Franco-Prussian War (1870–1871), and German reparations following World War I.

== History ==
Making one party pay a war indemnity is a common practice with a long history.

Rome imposed large indemnities on Carthage after the First (Treaty of Lutatius, 241 BC) and Second Punic Wars.

There was also the case of 230 million silver taels in reparations imposed on defeated China after the First Sino-Japanese War led Japan to a similar decision.

There have been attempts to codify reparations both in the Statutes of the International Criminal Court and the UN Basic Principles on the Right to a Remedy and Reparation for Victims, and some scholars have argued that individuals should have a right to seek compensation for wrongs they sustained during warfare through tort law.

States do not necessarily end up repaying the war debts that they initially agreed to.

=== Europe ===
==== Kalmar War ====
King Christian IV of Denmark attacked Sweden in the 1611–1613 Kalmar War but failed to accomplish his main objective of forcing it to return to the Kalmar Union. The war led to no territorial changes, but Sweden was forced to pay a war indemnity of 1 million silver riksdaler to Denmark, an amount known as the Älvsborg ransom. King Christian used this money to found several towns and fortresses, most notably Glückstadt (founded as a rival to Hamburg) and Christiania.

==== Napoleonic War ====
Following Napoleon's final loss at the Battle of Waterloo, under the Treaty of Paris (1815), defeated France was ordered to pay 700 million francs in indemnities. France was also to pay additional money to cover the cost of providing additional defensive fortifications to be built by neighbouring Coalition countries. It was the most expensive war reparation ever paid by a country (in proportion to its GDP).

==== Franco-Prussian War ====
After the Franco-Prussian War, according to conditions of Treaty of Frankfurt (May 10, 1871), France was obliged to pay a war indemnity of 5 billion gold francs in five years. The indemnity was proportioned, according to population, to be the exact equivalent to the indemnity imposed by Napoleon on Prussia in 1807. German troops remained in parts of France until the last installment of the indemnity was paid in September 1873, ahead of schedule.

==== Greco-Turkish War of 1897 ====
Following the Greco-Turkish War (1897), defeated Greece was forced to pay a large war indemnity to Turkey (£4 million). Greece, which was already in default, was compelled to permit oversight of its public finances by an international financial commission.

==== World War I ====
Russians agreed to pay reparations to the Central Powers when Russia exited the war in the Treaty of Brest-Litovsk (which was repudiated by the Bolshevik government eight months later). Bulgaria paid reparations of 2.25 billion gold francs (90 million pounds) to the Entente, according to the Treaty of Neuilly.

Germany agreed to pay reparations of 132 billion gold marks to the Triple Entente in the Treaty of Versailles. When Germany stopped making payments in 1932 after the agreement reached at the Lausanne Conference failed to be ratified, Germany had paid only a part of the sum. This still left Germany with debts it had incurred in order to finance the reparations, and these were revised by the Agreement on German External Debts in 1953. After another pause pending the reunification of Germany, the last installment of these debt repayments was paid on 3 October 2010.

==== World War II Germany ====
During World War II, Germany extracted payments from occupied countries, compelled loans, stole or destroyed property. In addition, countries were obliged to provide resources, and forced labour.

After World War II, according to the Potsdam Conference held between July 17 and August 2, 1945, Germany was to pay the Allies US$23 billion mainly in machinery and manufacturing plants. Dismantling in the West stopped in 1950. Reparations to the Soviet Union stopped in 1953 (only paid by the GDR).

Beginning before the German surrender and continuing for the next two years, the United States pursued a vigorous program of harvesting technological and scientific know-how as well as patents and many leading scientists in Germany (known as Operation Paperclip). Historian John Gimbel, in his book Science Technology and Reparations: Exploitation and Plunder in Postwar Germany, states that the "intellectual reparations" (referring to German scientists) taken by the Allies amounted to close to $10 billion. German reparations were partly to be in the form of forced labor. By 1947, approximately 4,000,000 German POWs and civilians were used as forced labor (under various headings, such as "reparations labor" or "enforced labor") in Europe, Canada and the United States after the end of the Second World War.

==== World War II Italy ====
According to the Treaty of Peace with Italy, 1947, Italy agreed to pay reparations of about US$125 million to Yugoslavia, US$105 million to Greece, US$100 million to the Soviet Union, US$25 million to Ethiopia, and US$5 million to Albania.

==== World War II Hungary ====
Hungary agreed to pay reparations of US$200 million to the Soviet Union, and US$100 million apiece to Czechoslovakia and Yugoslavia.

==== World War II Romania ====
Romania agreed to pay reparations of US$300 million to the Soviet Union. Romanian economists estimated that by February 1947 the Romanian economy had suffered further losses due to returning seized goods (US$320 million), restoring properties to the United Nations and their nationals (US$200 million), renouncing German debts (US$200 million), irregular requisitioning (US$150 million) and maintenance of the Soviet Army unit on its territory (US$75 million). Romania paid $5.6 million in 1945 and, in the assessment of Digi24, it was coerced to pay through SovRom $2 billion.

==== World War II Finland ====
Finland could only negotiate an interim peace deal with Soviet Union by agreeing to extensive reparations, and was eventually the only country to pay settled war reparations in full. The total amount of reparations rose to US$500 million, at the value of the dollar in 1953.

=== Japan ===
==== Sino-Japanese War of 1895 ====
The Treaty of Shimonoseki, signed on April 17, 1895, obliged China to pay an indemnity of 200 million silver taels (¥3.61 billion) to Japan; and to open the ports of Shashi, Chongqing, Suzhou and Hangzhou to Japanese trade.

==== World War II Japan ====
According to Article 14 of the Treaty of San Francisco (1951):

It is recognized that Japan should pay reparations to the Allied Powers for the damage and suffering caused by it during the war....Japan will promptly enter into negotiations with Allied Powers so desiring, whose present territories were occupied by Japanese forces and damaged by Japan, with a view to assisting to compensate those countries for the cost of repairing the damage done, by making available the services of the Japanese people in production, salvaging and other work for the Allied Powers in question.

War reparations made pursuant to the San Francisco Peace Treaty with Japan (1951) include: reparations amounting to US$550 million (198 billion yen 1956) were made to the Philippines, and US$39 million (14.04 billion yen 1959) to South Vietnam; payment to the International Committee of the Red Cross to compensate prisoners of war (POW) of 4.5 million pounds sterling (4.54109 billion yen) was made; and Japan relinquished all overseas assets, approximately US$23.681 billion (379.499 billion yen).

Japan signed the peace treaty with 49 nations in 1952 and concluded 54 bilateral agreements that included those with Burma (US$20 million 1954, 1963), South Korea (US$300 million 1965), Indonesia (US$223.08 million 1958), the Philippines (US$525 million/52.94 billion yen 1967), Malaysia (25 million Malaysian dollars/2.94 billion yen 1967), Thailand (5.4 billion yen 1955), Micronesia (1969), Laos (1958), Cambodia (1959), Mongolia (1977), Spain ($5.5 million 1957), Switzerland, the Netherlands ($10 million 1956), Sweden and Denmark. Payments of reparations started in 1955, lasted for 23 years and ended in 1977. For countries that renounced any reparations from Japan, it agreed to pay an indemnity and/or grants in accordance with bilateral agreements. In the Joint Communiqué of the Government of Japan and the Government of the People's Republic of China (1972), the People's Republic of China renounced its demand for war reparations from Japan. In the Soviet–Japanese Joint Declaration of 1956, the Soviet Union waived its rights to reparations from Japan, and both Japan and the Soviet Union waived all reparations claims arising from war. Additionally, Ceylon (now Sri Lanka), under President J. R. Jayewardene, declined war reparations from Japan.

=== Iraq ===
==== Invasion of Kuwait ====
After the Gulf War, Iraq accepted United Nations Security Council Resolution 687, which declared Iraq's financial liability for damage caused in its invasion of Kuwait. The United Nations Compensation Commission (UNCC) was established, and US$350 billion in claims were filed by governments, corporations, and individuals. UNCC accepted and awarded compensations claims for $52.4 billion to approximately 1.5 million successful claimants; as of July 2019, $48.7 billion has been paid and only $3.7 billion was left to be paid to Kuwait on behalf of the Kuwait Petroleum Corporation. The UNCC says that its prioritization of claims by natural people, ahead of claims by governments and entities or corporations (legal persons), "marked a significant step in the evolution of international claims practice". Funds for these payments were to come from a 30% share of Iraq's oil revenues from the oil for food program.

==== Invasion by the United States ====
Certain groups in Iraq and the United States have campaigned for reparations by the United States for the devastation and health effects suffered by Iraqi citizens during the overthrow of Saddam Hussein in the Iraq War. However, there has been little international support.

=== Iran ===
During the 2025–2026 Iran–United States negotiations, the United States and Iran agreed to a memorandum of understanding that included US$300billion of funds to be provided by the United States and allies to be used for economic development and reconstruction. The United States government described program as "a conduit for private investment, not a reparations program".

During the conflict, Iran effectively maintained sovereignty over the Strait of Hormuz, charging $2 million as transit fee. Iran's government justified the fees as reparations for the 2026 war.

== See also ==
- Boxer Protocol
- Haitian independence debt
- Legal remedy
- Reparation (legal)
- Reparations Agreement between Israel and West Germany, Holocaust reparations
- Reparations (transitional justice)
- Restitution
- Treaty on Basic Relations between Japan and the Republic of Korea (1965)
- Treaty of Frankfurt (1871)
- Treaty of San Francisco (1951)
- Treaty of Versailles
- Potsdam Conference
- Yalta Conference
- World War I reparations, made from Germany due to the signing of the Treaty of Versailles
