= George Abel Schreiner =

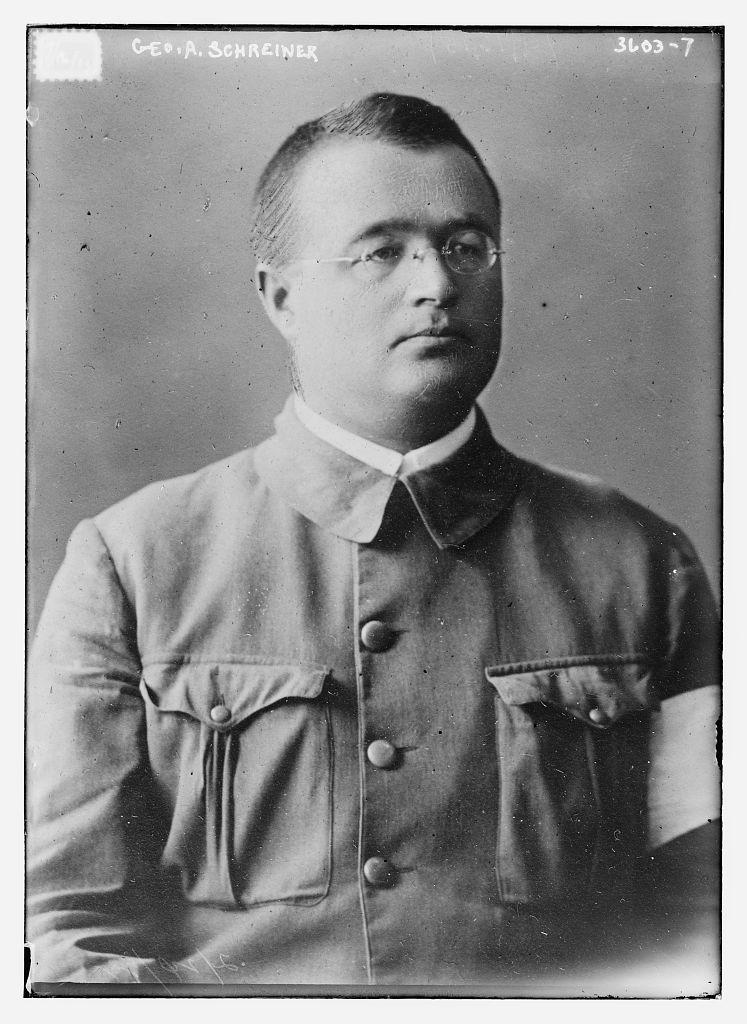
- Schreiner in 1916
- Born: August 21, 1875; Avricourt, Alsace-Lorraine, Germany
- Died: January 21, 1942 (aged 66); Daytona Beach, Florida, United States
- Other name: George A. Schreiner
- Occupation: World War I correspondent for the Associated Press.

George Abel Schreiner (August 21, 1875 - January 21, 1942) was a German-American war correspondent during World War I for the Associated Press.

== Biography ==
He was born on August 21, 1875, in Avricourt, Alsace-Lorraine, Germany. He migrated to the United States on October 15, 1900. He was a war correspondent during World War I for the Associated Press. He died on January 21, 1942, in Daytona Beach, Florida.
