= Camphausen =

Camphausen is a German surname. Notable people with the name include:

- Gottfried Ludolf Camphausen (1803–1890), Prussian politician and Prime Minister
- Otto von Camphausen (1812–1896), Prussian statesman
- Wilhelm Camphausen (1818–1885, Düsseldorf), painter of historical and battle scenes
