= Avricourt, Meurthe-et-Moselle =

Avricourt
- Commune
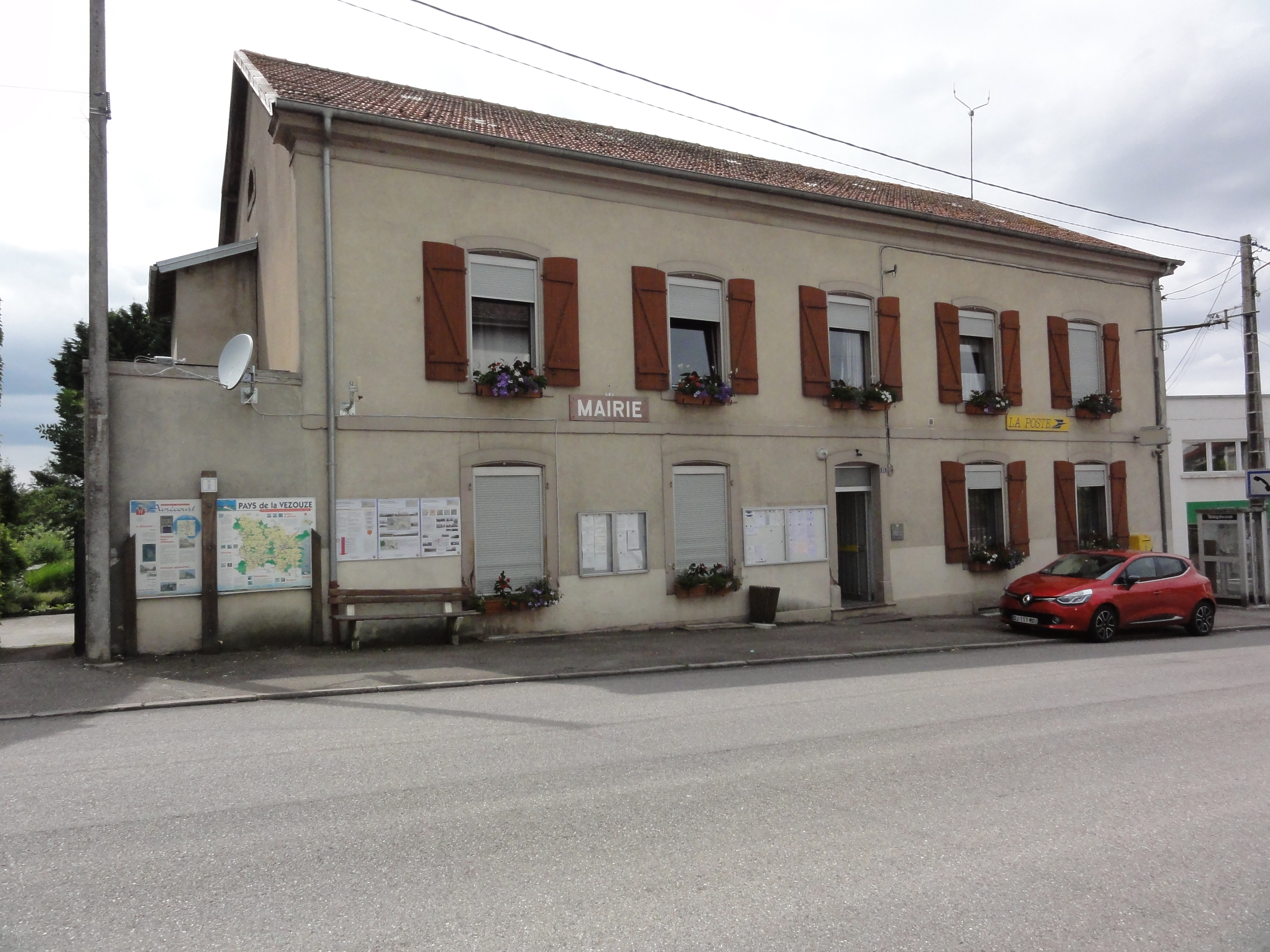
- The town hall in Avricourt

- Coat of arms
- Location of Avricourt
- Location within France Location within Grand Est
- Coordinates: 48°38′43″N 6°48′23″E
- Country: France
- Region: Grand Est
- Department: Meurthe-et-Moselle
- Arrondissement: Lunéville
- Canton: Baccarat
- Intercommunality: CC Vezouze Piémont

Government
  - Mayor (2020–2026): Denis Lambotte
- Area^{1}: 2.25 km^{2} (0.87 sq mi)
- Elevation: 312 m (1,024 ft)
- Highest elevation: 336 m (1,102 ft)
- Lowest elevation: 277 m (909 ft)
- Population (2023): 377
  - Density: 168/km^{2} (434/sq mi)
- Time zone: UTC+01:00 (CET)
  - Summer (DST): UTC+02:00 (CEST)
- INSEE/Postal code: 54035 /54450
- ^{1} French Land Register data, which excludes lakes, ponds, glaciers > 1 km^{2} (0.386 sq mi or 247 acres) and river estuaries.

Avricourt (French pronunciation: [avʁikuʁ]) is a commune in the Meurthe-et-Moselle department in northeastern France.

Avricourt, Meurthe-et-Moselle is adjacent to Avricourt, Moselle with which it formed a single entity until a revision of the Treaty of Frankfurt in 1871.

== Population ==
Historical population
| Year | Pop. | ±% p.a. |
|---|---|---|
| 1968 | 565 | — |
| 1975 | 531 | −0.88% |
| 1982 | 543 | +0.32% |
| 1990 | 524 | −0.44% |
| 1999 | 442 | −1.87% |
| 2007 | 420 | −0.64% |
| 2012 | 400 | −0.97% |
| 2017 | 386 | −0.71% |
| 2023 | 377 | −0.39% |
Source: INSEE

== See also ==
- Avricourt, Moselle
- Communes of the Meurthe-et-Moselle department
