= Otto von Camphausen =

Prussian statesman (1812–1896)

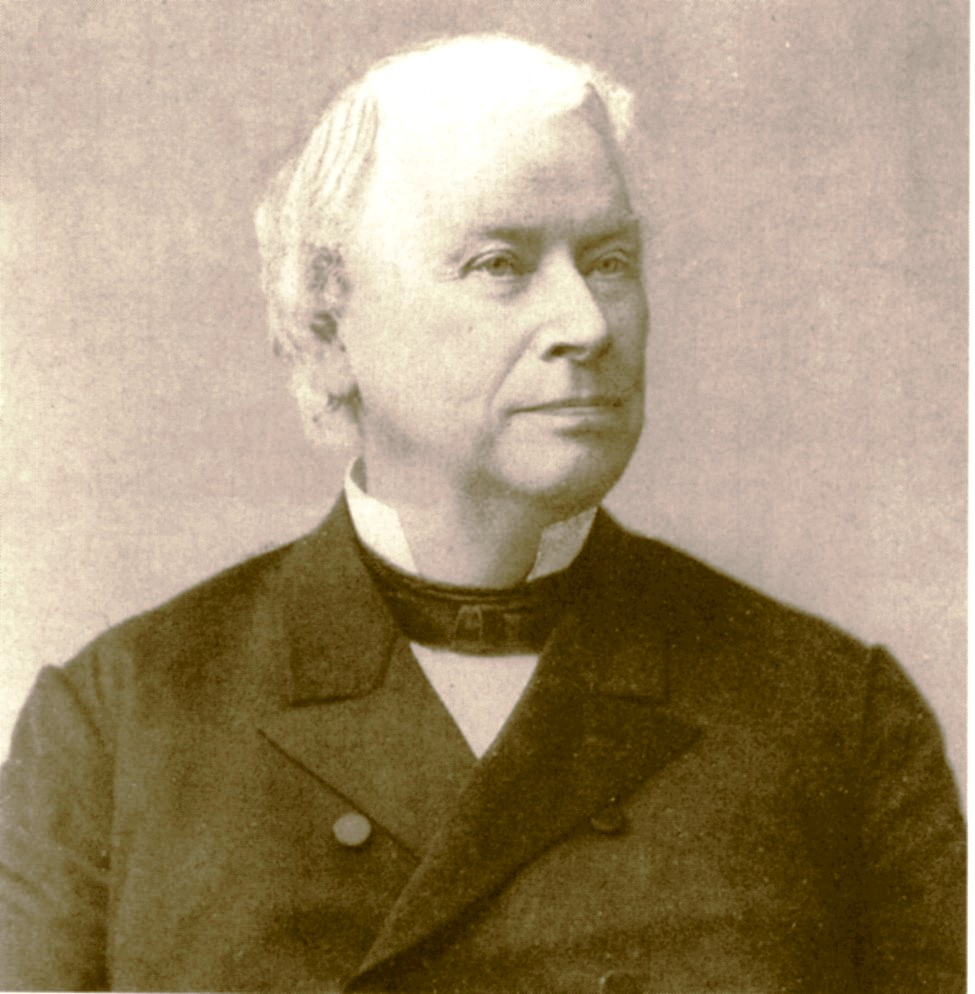
Otto von Camphausen

Otto von Camphausen (21 October 1812 – 18 May 1896) was a Prussian statesman.

== Biography ==
Camphausen was born in Hünshoven, part of Geilenkirchen on the right bank of the River Wurm, in the Rhine Province. Having studied jurisprudence and political economy at the University of Bonn, Heidelberg University, the Ludwig-Maximilians-Universität München, and the Friedrich Wilhelm University of Berlin, he entered the legal career at Cologne, and immediately devoted his attention to financial and commercial questions.

Nominated assessor in 1837, he acted for five years in this capacity in Magdeburg and Coblenz, became in 1845 counselor in the ministry of finance, and was in 1849 elected a member of the second chamber of the Prussian diet, joining the Moderate Liberal party.

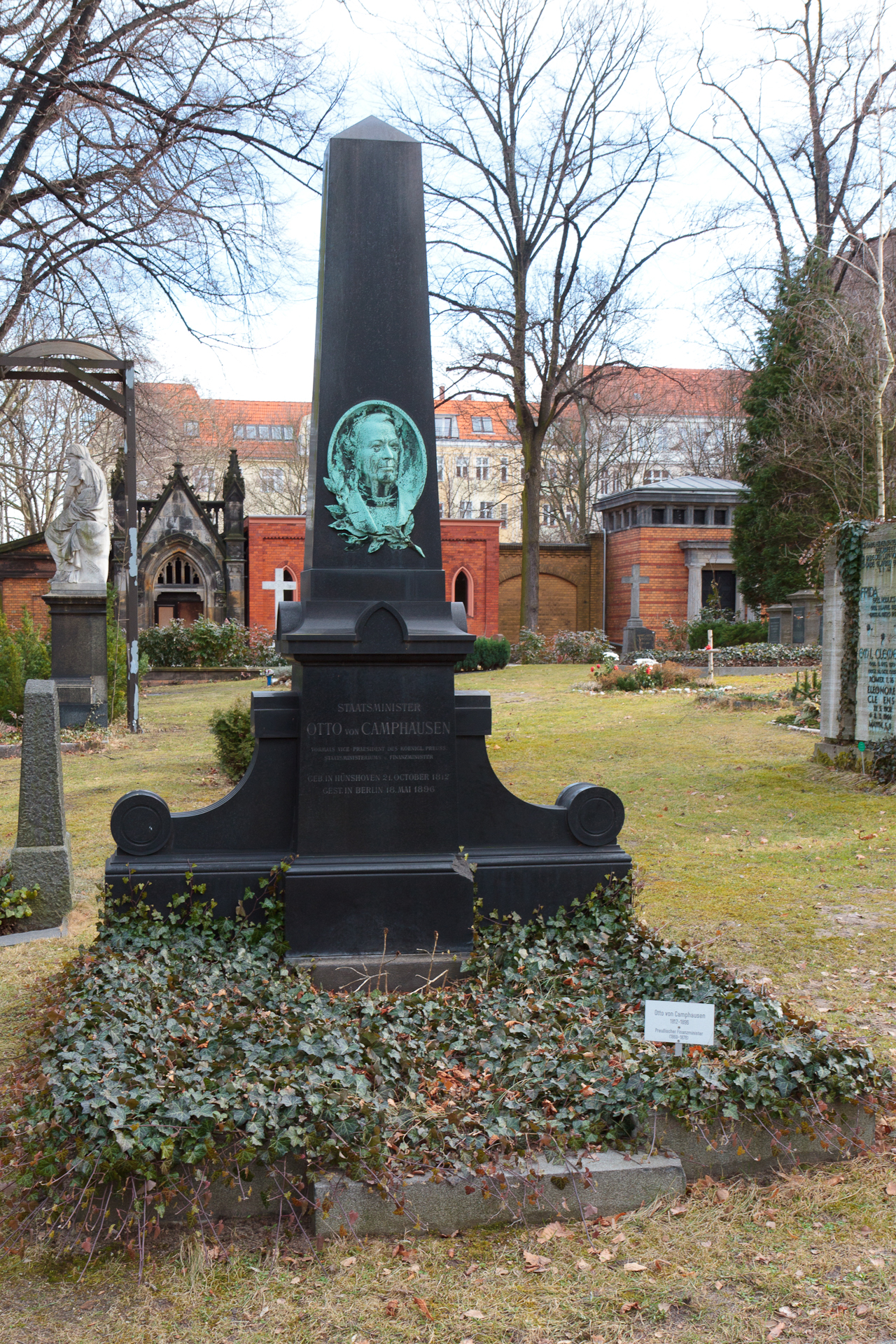
Grave of Camphausen in Berlin

In 1869, he was appointed minister of finance. On taking office, he was confronted with a deficit in the revenue, which he successfully cleared off by effecting a conversion of a greater part of the state loans. The Franco-Prussian War indemnity enabled him to redeem a considerable portion of the state debt and to remit certain taxes. He was, however, a too warm adherent of free trade principles to enjoy the confidence either of the Agrarian Party or of Prince Otto von Bismarck, and his antagonism to the tobacco monopoly and the general economic policy of the latter brought about his retirement.

Camphausen's great services to Prussia were recognized by his sovereign in the bestowal of the Order of the Black Eagle in 1895, a dignity carrying with it a patent of nobility. He died at Berlin.
