= French indemnity =

1871 war indemnity paid by France to Germany

The French indemnity was the indemnity the French Third Republic paid to the German Empire after the French defeat in the Franco-Prussian War in 1871.

== Background ==
An armistice was concluded on 28 January 1871 to allow elections to the French National Assembly. A preliminary peace was signed on 26 February with the Treaty of Frankfurt signed on 10 May.

The Prussian State Ministry on 8 February recommended an indemnity of 1 billion thaler (3 billion francs), 95% of which would be paid to the army. The Prussian Finance Minister Otto von Camphausen said:

The German nation had after all suffered so many additional losses in blood and material goods which are beyond all accounting that it is entirely justified to assess the price of the war generously and in addition to the estimated sum to demand an appropriate surcharge for the incalculable damages.

The Prussian Chancellor Otto von Bismarck sent his personal banker Gerson von Bleichröder to negotiate between the French government and French financial circles. Adolphe Thiers, the head of the French provisional government, offered an indemnity of 1.5 billion francs and claimed that France would be unable to pay 5 billion. Bismarck responded by saying that the Prussian Army would occupy France, "we will see if we can get 5 billion francs from it". Bismarck wrote that "France being the richest country in Europe, nothing could keep her quiet but effectually to empty her pockets".

The French National Assembly ratified the terms by 546 votes to 107.

== Indemnity ==
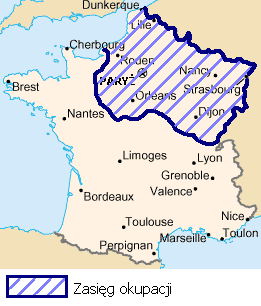
Area of France under Prussian occupation until payment of the indemnity was complete (including Alsace-Lorraine, which was ceded to Germany)

The indemnity was 5 billion francs, with German troops occupying France until it was paid. The 5 billion gold marks, converted using the retail price index in 2011, was worth 342 billion. Converted using the GDP deflater it amounted to 479 billion and substantially more according to other comparisons such as GDP per capita. The indemnity was proportioned, according to population, to be equivalent to the indemnity imposed by Napoleon on Prussia in the Treaties of Tilsit in 1807.

== Aftermath ==
The last payment of the indemnity was paid in early September 1873, two years before the deadline, and the German army of occupation was withdrawn in mid-September.

It was generally assumed at the time that the indemnity would cripple France for thirty or fifty years. However, the Third Republic that emerged after the war embarked on an ambitious programme of reforms: it introduced banks, built schools (reducing illiteracy), improved roads, increased railways into rural areas, encouraged industry and promoted French national identity rather than regional identities. France also reformed the army, adopting conscription.

In Germany the swift payment of the indemnity caused a stock market boom, along with an asset bubble in the form of a property boom. This lasted until the Panic of 1873 which ushered in the Long Depression until 1896.
