= Mont Donon =

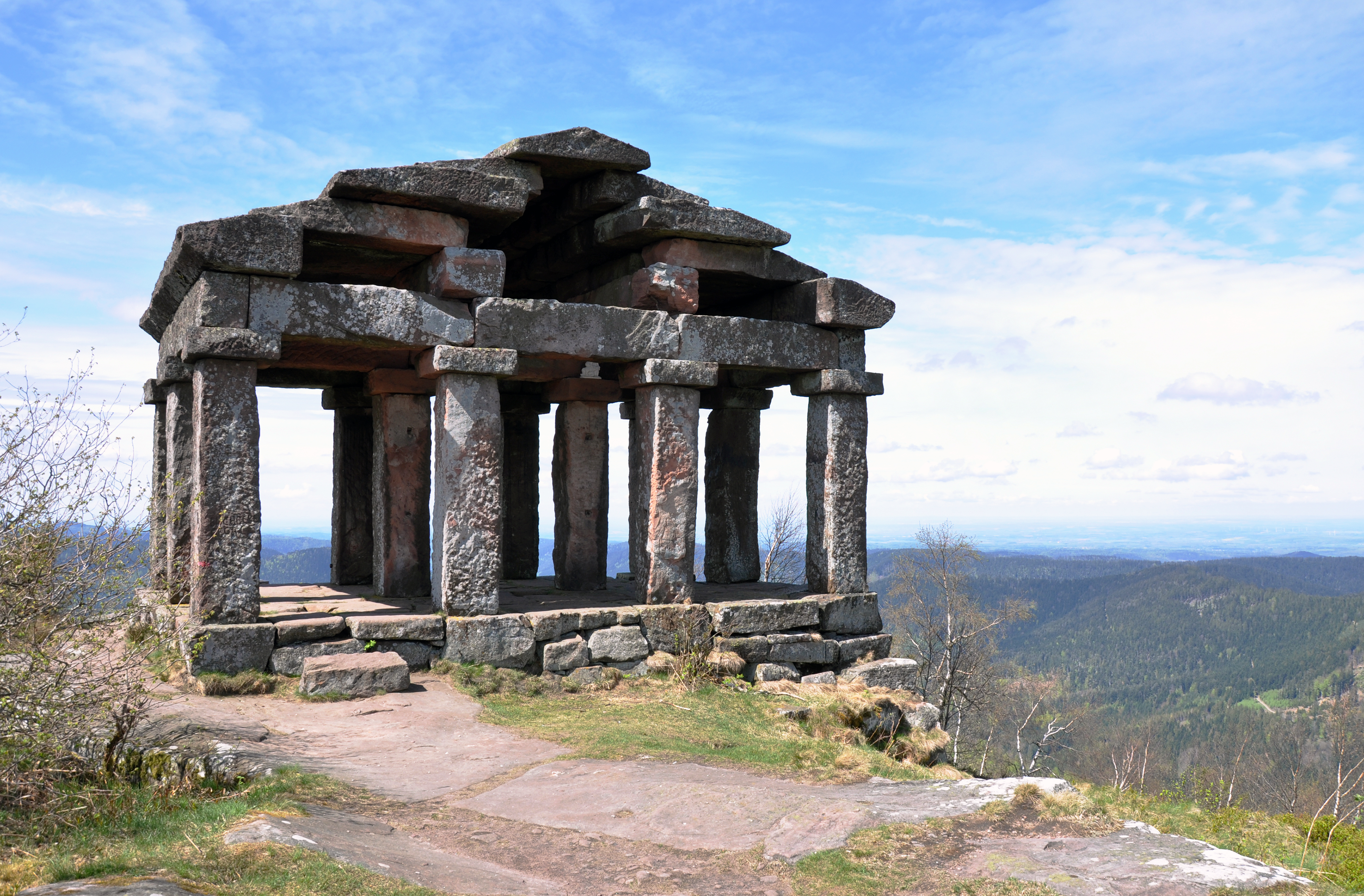
- Temple-like structure built in 1869 at the summit of Mont Donon to protect archeological remains

Highest point
- Elevation: 1,009 m (3,310 ft)
- Prominence: 270 m (890 ft)
- Coordinates: 48°30′50″N 07°10′15″E

Geography
- Location within France
- Location: Bas-Rhin, France
- Parent range: Vosges Mountains

Mont Donon is the highest peak in the northern Vosges. It is a Category 2 climb in the Tour de France.

On Donon, there is an 80-metre-tall (260 ft) lattice tower for TV transmission. Its TV transmission antennas are covered by a polymeric cylinder, which gives its structure a characteristic shape.

An engraved block of sandstone near the summit commemorates the conception of Victor Hugo.

Many archaeological remains of a Gallo-Roman sanctuary have been found on and around the top of the mountain. They are now displayed in the Musée archéologique de Strasbourg.

== World War I ==
During the earliest stages of World War I, Mount Donon was the site of heavy fighting between German and French troops between 14 August and 22 August 1914 and specially on 21 and 22 August.

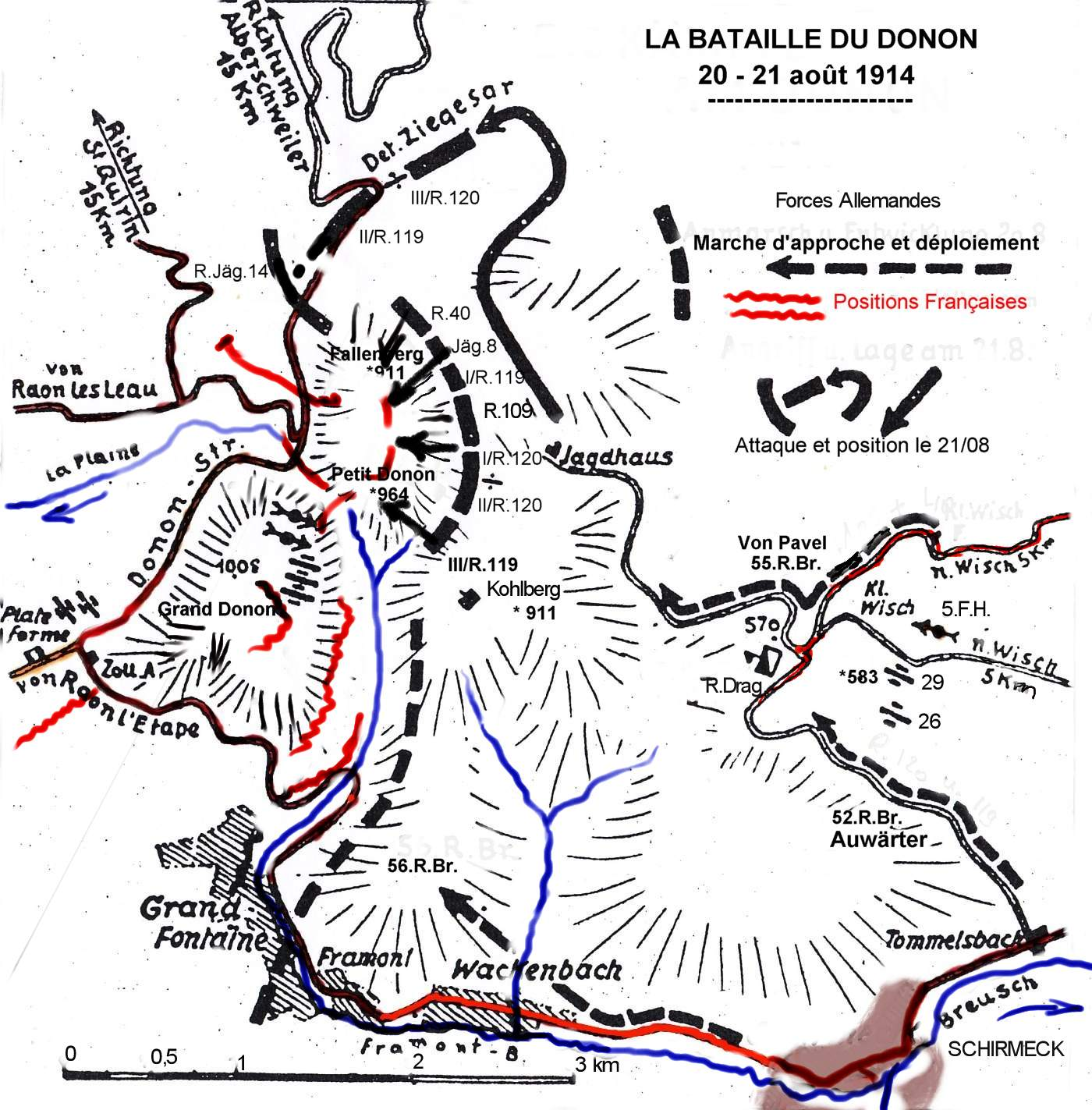
Map of Donon Battle.

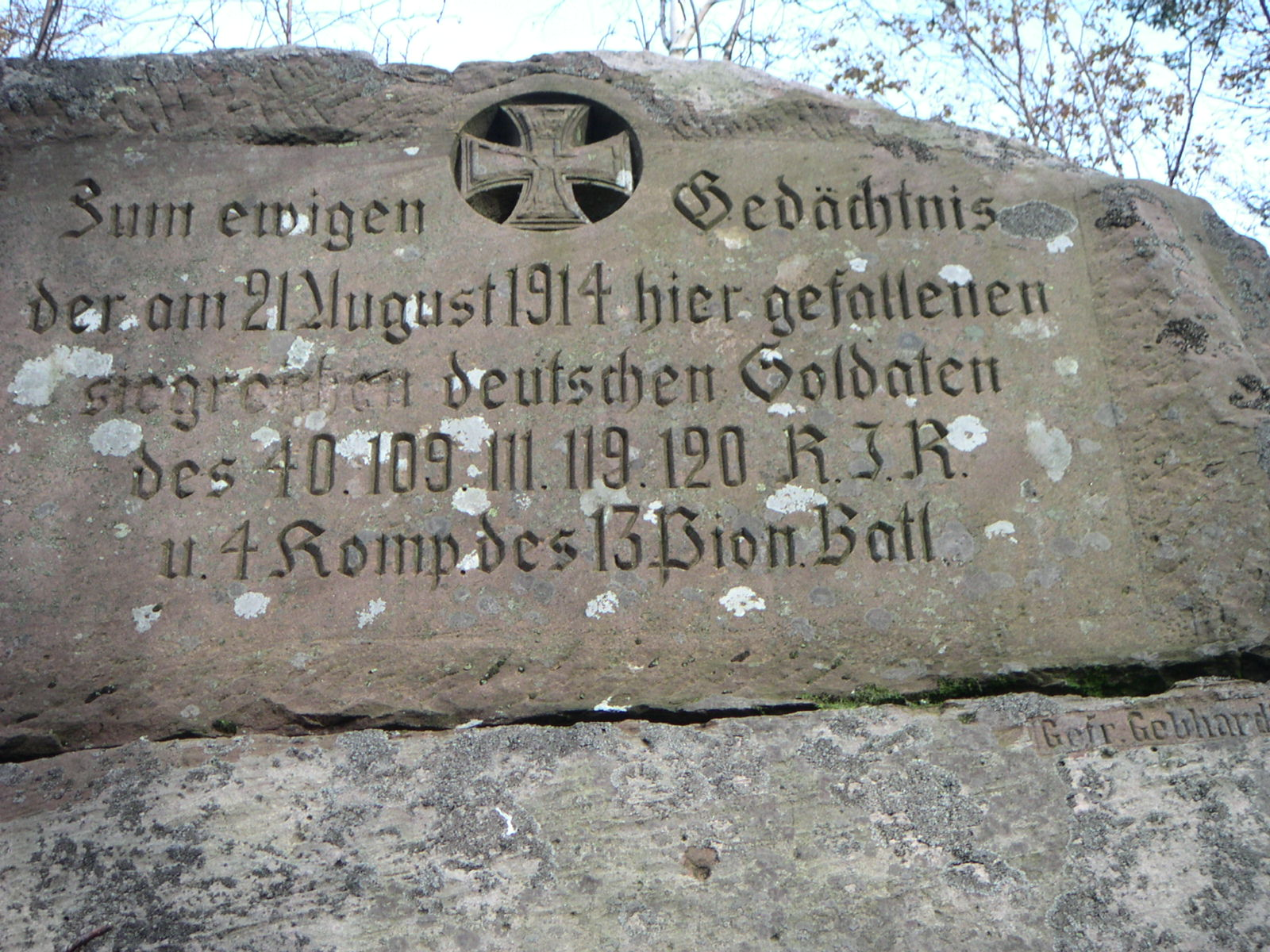
Memorial to German troops fallen on August 21, 1914

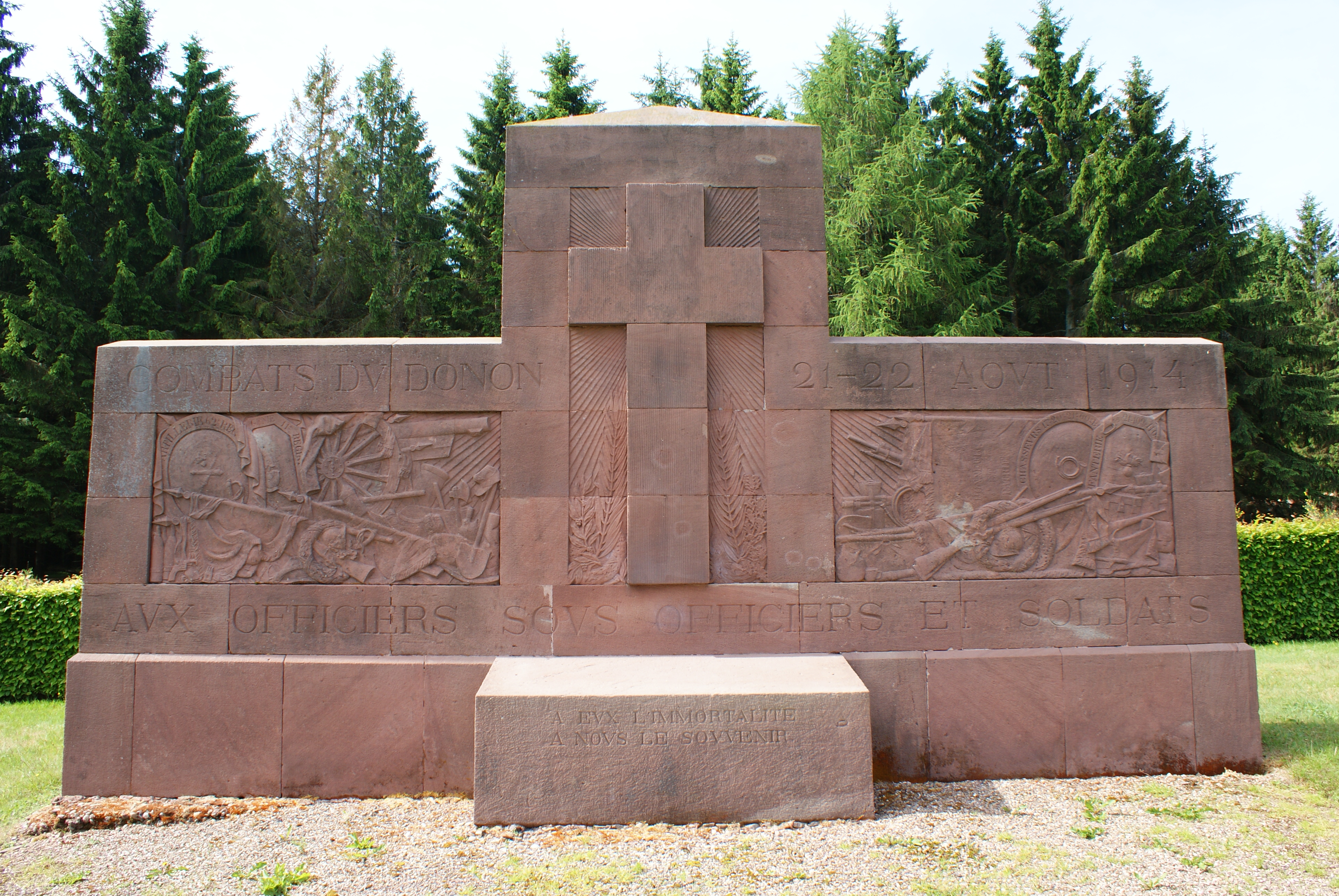
Memorial to French troops fallen on August 21 and 22, 1914

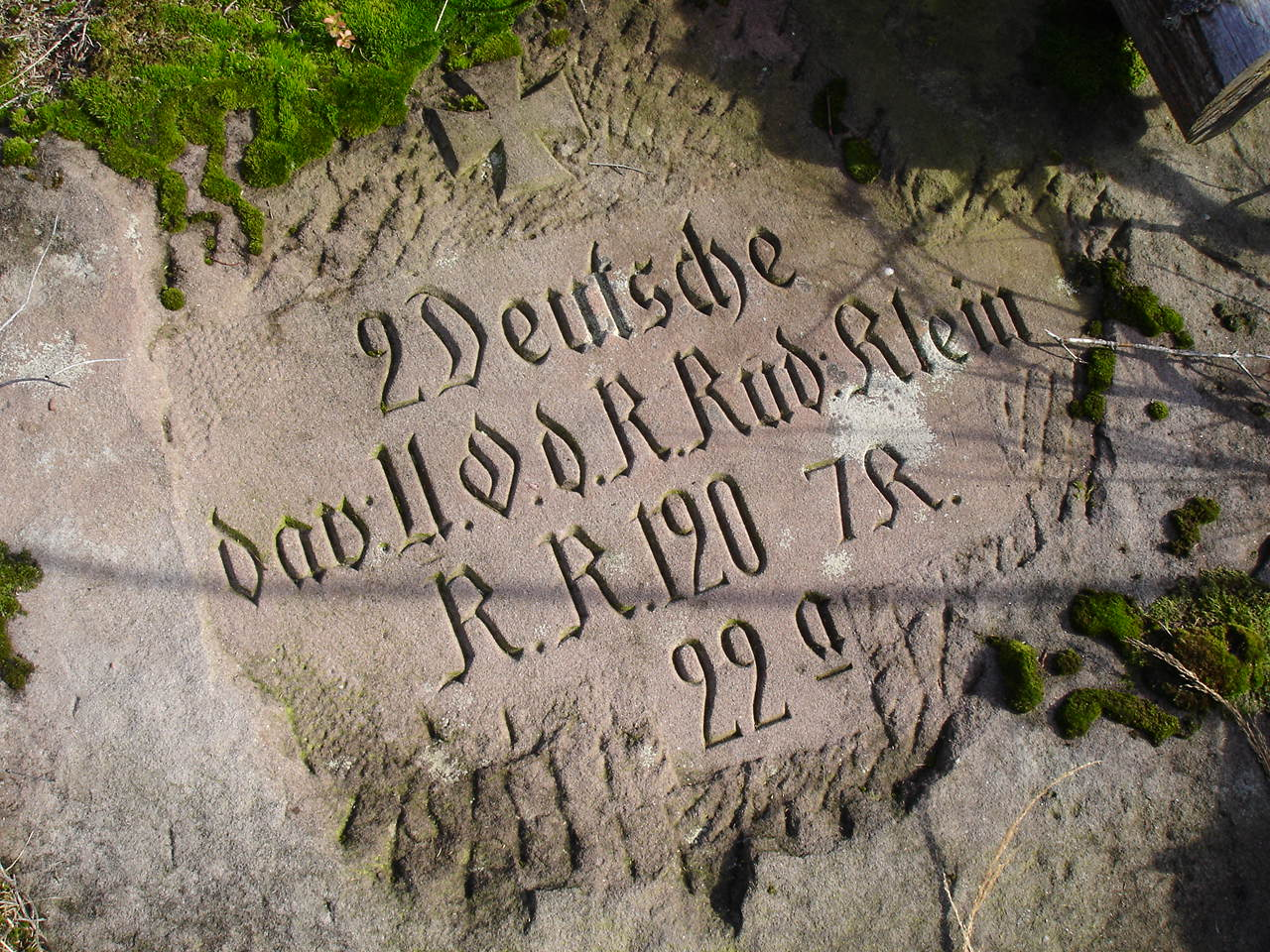
Grave of 2 Germans killed on August 22

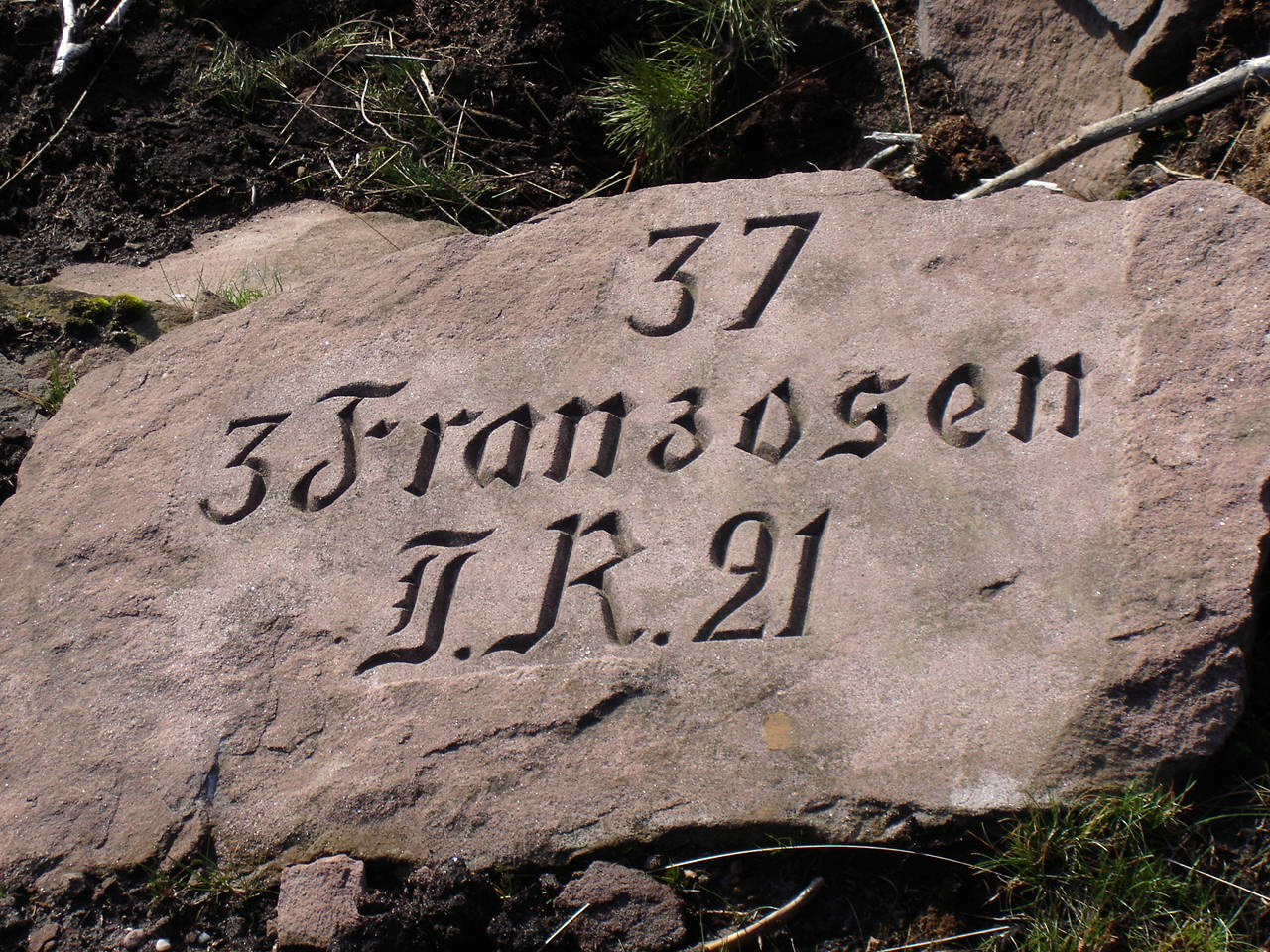
Grave of 3 Frenchmen
