= Avricourt, Moselle =

Avricourt
- Commune
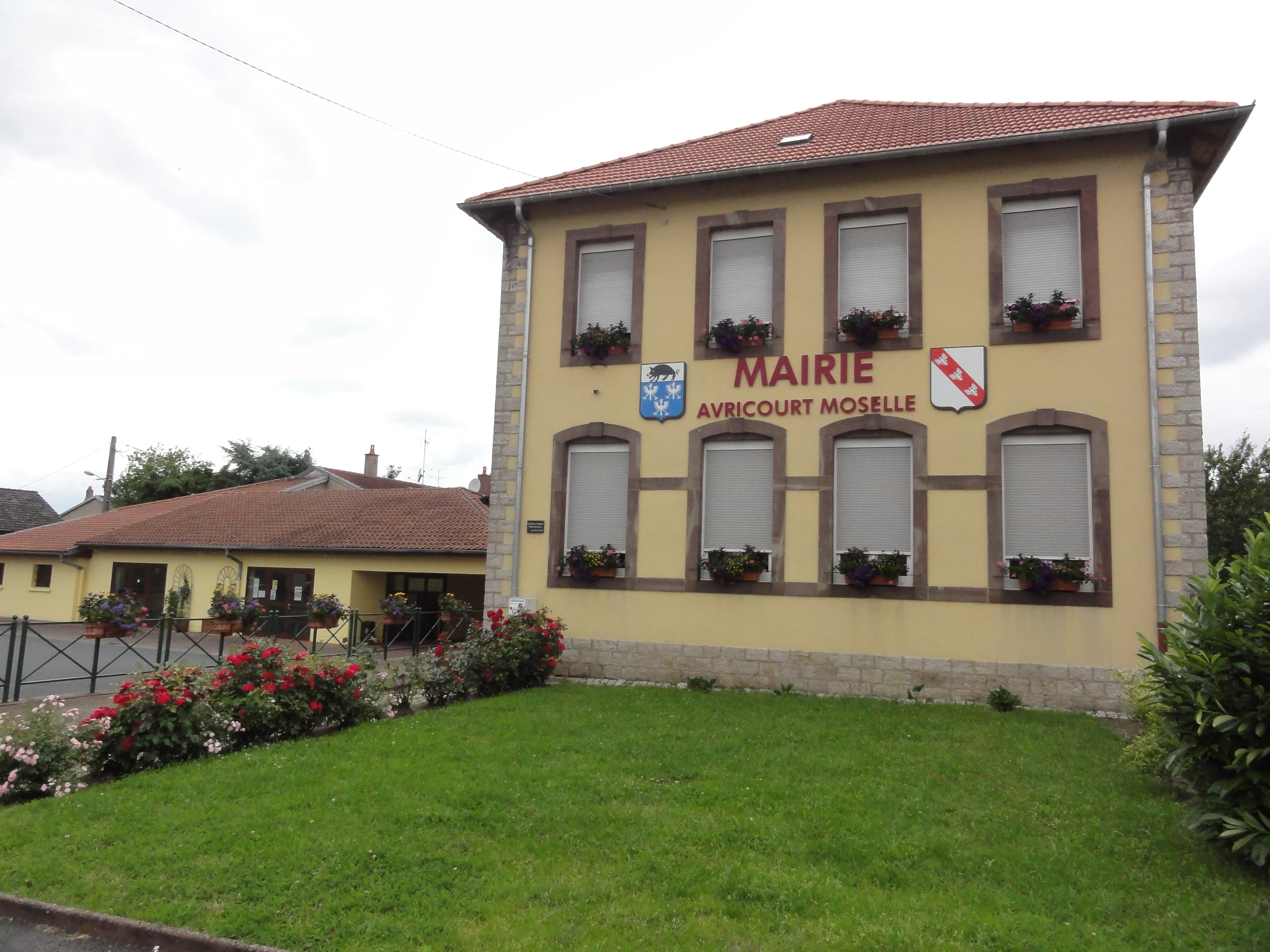
- The town hall in Avricourt

- Coat of arms
- Location of Avricourt
- Location within France Location within Grand Est
- Coordinates: 48°39′05″N 6°48′25″E
- Country: France
- Region: Grand Est
- Department: Moselle
- Arrondissement: Sarrebourg-Château-Salins
- Canton: Sarrebourg
- Intercommunality: CC Sarrebourg - Moselle Sud

Government
  - Mayor (2020–2026): Éric Denny
- Area^{1}: 10.32 km^{2} (3.98 sq mi)
- Highest elevation: 334 m (1,096 ft)
- Lowest elevation: 240 m (790 ft)
- Population (2023): 574
  - Density: 55.6/km^{2} (144/sq mi)
- Time zone: UTC+01:00 (CET)
  - Summer (DST): UTC+02:00 (CEST)
- INSEE/Postal code: 57042 /57810
- ^{1} French Land Register data, which excludes lakes, ponds, glaciers > 1 km^{2} (0.386 sq mi or 247 acres) and river estuaries.

Avricourt (French pronunciation: [avʁikuʁ]; German: Deutsch-Avricourt, from 1915: Elfringen) is a commune in the Moselle department in Grand Est in northeastern France.

Avricourt, Moselle is adjacent to Avricourt, Meurthe-et-Moselle with which it formed a single entity until a revision of the Treaty of Frankfurt in 1871.

== Population ==
Historical population
Year	Pop.	±% p.a.
1968	877	—
1975	811	−1.11%
1982	725	−1.59%
1990	669	−1.00%
1999	647	−0.37%
2007	662	+0.29%
2012	720	+1.69%
2017	612	−3.20%
2023	574	−1.06%
Source: INSEE

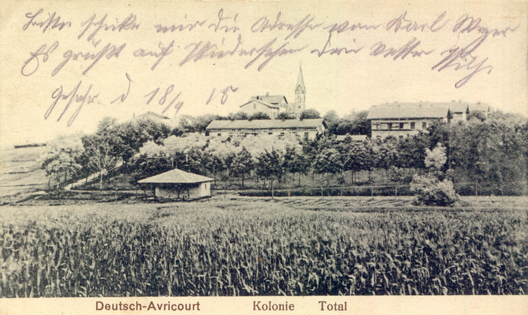
Avricourt in 1915

== See also ==
- Avricourt, Meurthe-et-Moselle
- Communes of the Moselle department
- Parc naturel régional de Lorraine
