= Treaty of Frankfurt (1871) =

1871 peace treaty ending the Franco-Prussian War

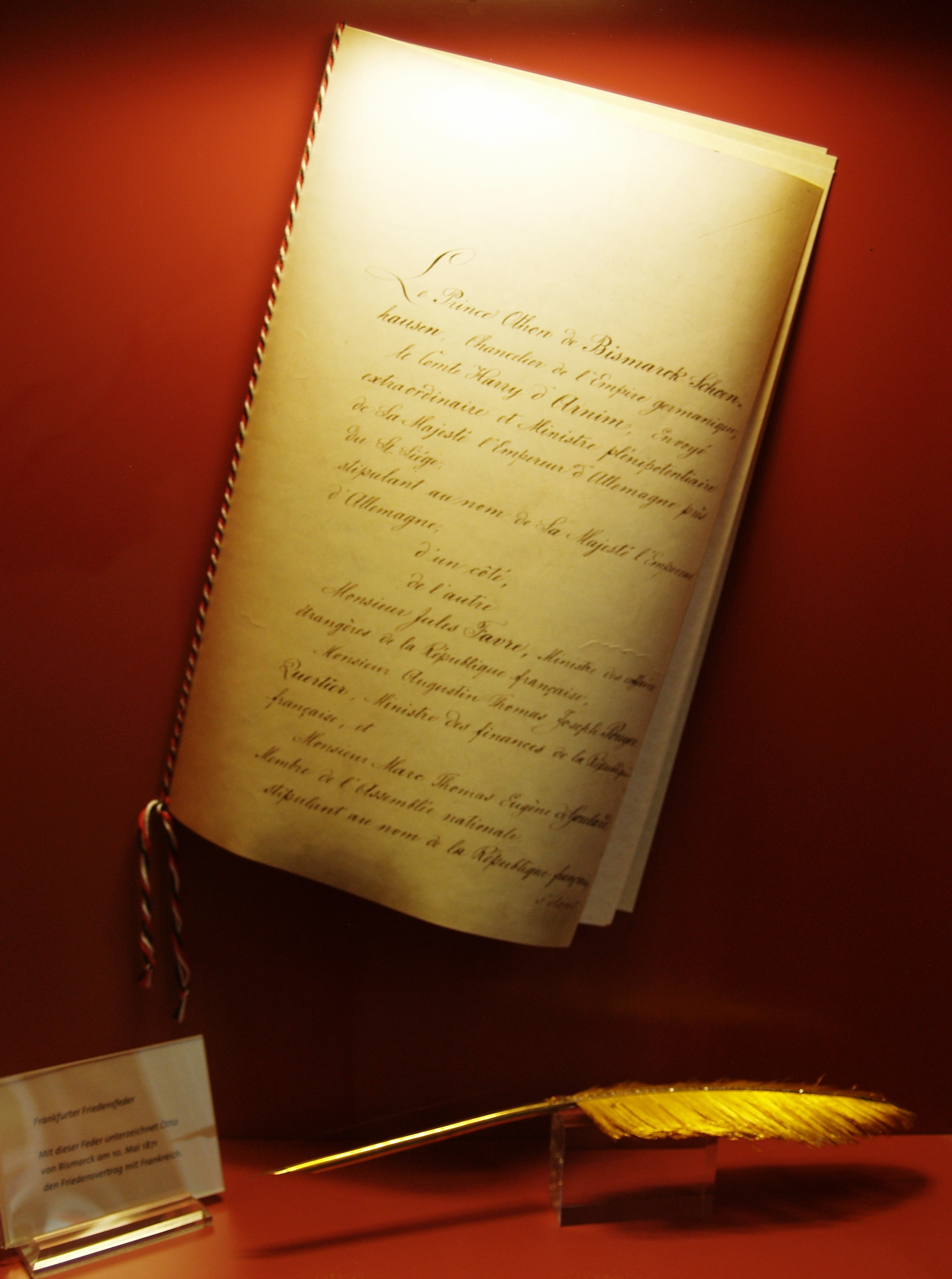
- Created: 10 May 1871
- Location: Archiv der Otto-von-Bismarck-Stiftung in Friedrichsruh
- Purpose: Ended Franco-Prussian War

The Treaty of Frankfurt (French: Traité de Francfort; German: Friede von Frankfurt) was a peace treaty signed in Frankfurt on 10 May 1871 by the German Empire and the French Third Republic, at the end of the Franco-Prussian War.

== Summary ==
Alsace-Lorraine

The treaty did the following:

- Established the frontier between the French Third Republic and the German Empire, which involved the ceding of 1,694 French villages and cities to Germany in:
  - Alsace: the French departments of Bas-Rhin and Haut-Rhin, except for the city of Belfort and its territory;
  - Lorraine: most of the French department of Moselle, one-third of the department of Meurthe, including the cities of Château-Salins and Sarrebourg, and the cantons Saales and Schirmeck in the department of Vosges.
- Gave residents of the Alsace-Lorraine region the right of option until 1 October 1872 to either keep their French nationality and emigrate, or remain in the region and become German citizens.
- Set a framework for the withdrawal of German troops from certain areas.
- Regulated the payment of France's war indemnity of five billion francs (due within five years).
- Recognized the acceptance of Wilhelm I of Prussia as German Emperor.
- Required military occupation in parts of France until the indemnity was paid (France paid the indemnity quicker than the agreed time).

The treaty also established the terms for the following:

- The use of navigable waterways in connection to Alsace-Lorraine
- Trade between the two countries
- The return of prisoners of war

== Factors that influenced the boundary ==
=== Strategy ===
The German military spoke up for control of the Alsace region, up to the Vosges (mountain range) and the area between Thionville (Diedenhofen) and Metz as a requirement for the protection of Germany. Most importantly, the German military regarded control of the route between Thionville and Metz as the most important area of control if there were ever to be a future war with France.

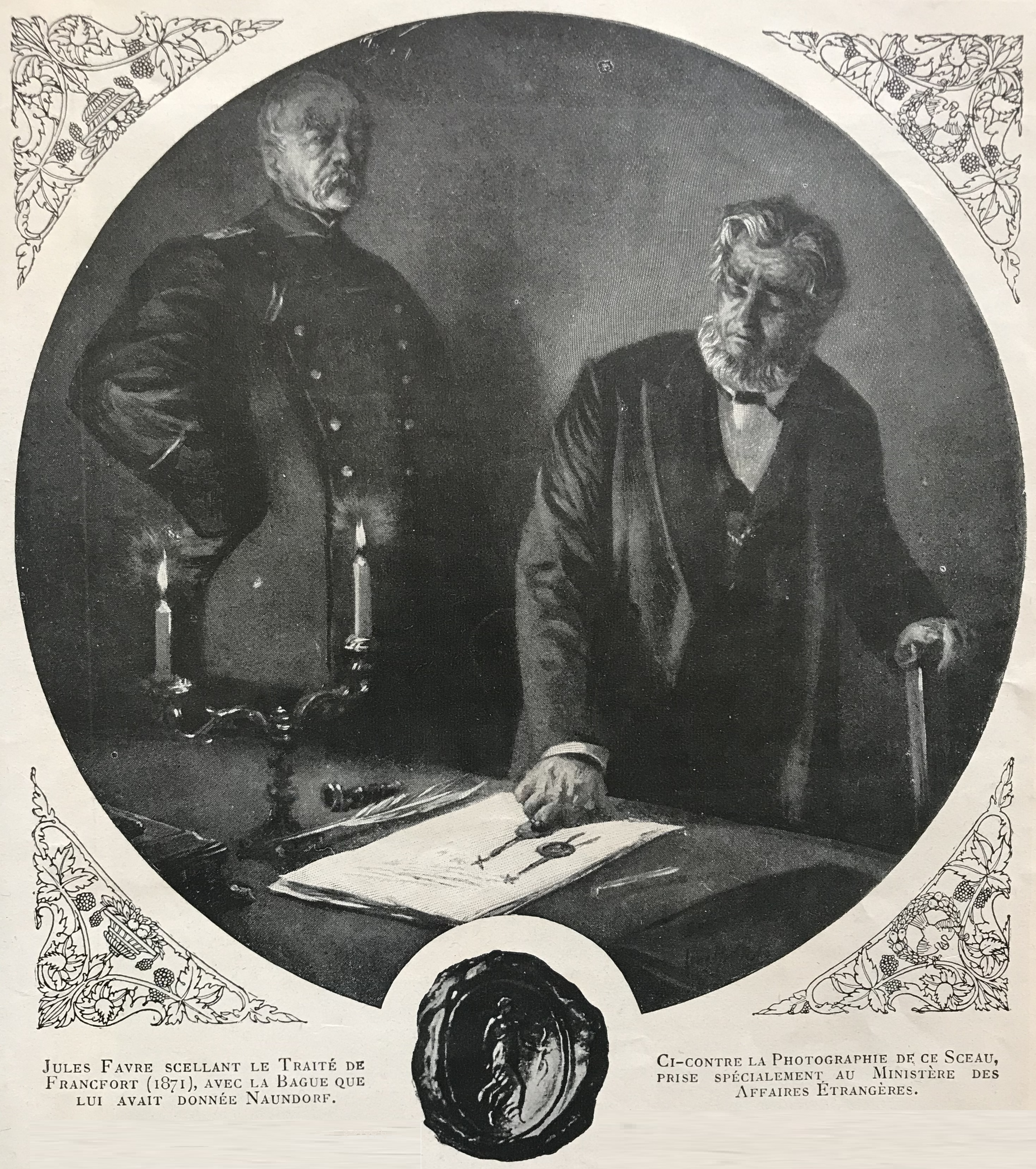
Watched by Bismarck, Jules Favre, French Minister of Foreign Affairs, puts his seal on the Treaty of Frankfurt.

=== Politics ===
Without a westward shift in the boundary, the new empire's frontier with France would have been largely divided between the states of Baden and Bavaria whose governments were less than enthusiastic with the prospect of having a vengeful France on their doorstep. It also would have necessitated the stationing of substantial imperial forces within these states' borders, possibly compromising their ability to exercise the considerable autonomy that the southern states were able to maintain in the unification treaty. A shift in the frontier alleviated these issues.

=== Nationalism ===
The new political border largely (though not entirely) followed the linguistic border. The fact that the majority of the population in the new Imperial Territory (Reichsland) territory spoke Germanic dialects, and had previously been a part of the German-focused Holy Roman Empire until they had been gradually obtained by France over the previous two centuries, allowed Berlin to justify the annexation on nationalistic grounds. However, the conquest of French-speaking areas such as the city of Metz sparked outrage in France, and was used as one of the main arguments for French revanchism.

=== Economy ===
Natural resources in Alsace-Lorraine (iron ore, and coal) do not appear to have played a role in Germany's fight for the areas annexed. Military annexation was the main stated goal along with unification of the German people. At the same time, France lost 1,447,000 hectares, 1,694 villages and 1,597,000 inhabitants. It also lost 20% of its mining and steel potential. The treaty of trade of 1862 with Prussia was not renewed but France granted Germany, for trade and navigation, a most-favoured nation clause. France would respect the clauses of the Treaty of Frankfurt in their entirety until 1914.

France also had to pay a full payment of 5,000,000,000 francs in gold, with one billion in 1871, before any German forces withdrawal (which occurred in September 1873).

== Legacy ==
This treaty polarized French policy towards Germany for the next 40 years. Recovery of Alsace-Lorraine (the "lost provinces") became a revanchist obsession which would be one of the most powerful motives for France's involvement in World War I.

In 1918, U.S. President Woodrow Wilson advocated the transfer of Alsace-Lorraine to France as the eighth of his Fourteen Points without reference to the wishes of its population. It was tacitly presumed that they wanted it. Alsace-Lorraine was returned to France under the 1919 Treaty of Versailles. This conflicted with the right of self-determination, as expressed elsewhere in the Fourteen Points and the Treaty.
