= Wasgau =

Hill range in France and Germany

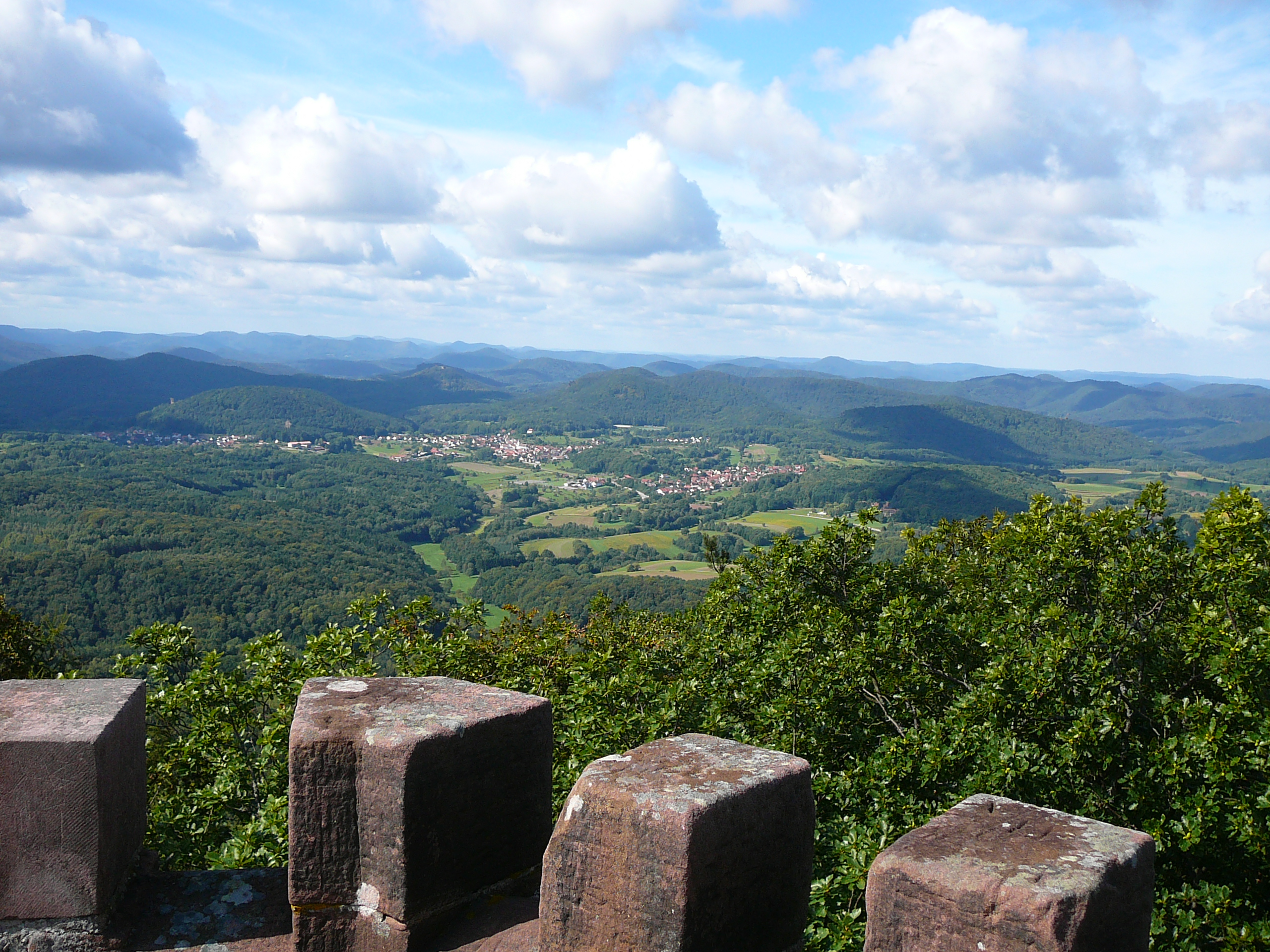
- Typical Wasgau countryside with conical hills and plains: view looking southwest from Rehberg

Highest point
- Peak: Grand Wintersberg (581 m above NHN) for the whole Wasgau; Rehberg (577 m above NHN) for the German part

Dimensions
- Area: 1,300 km^{2} (500 mi^{2})

Geography
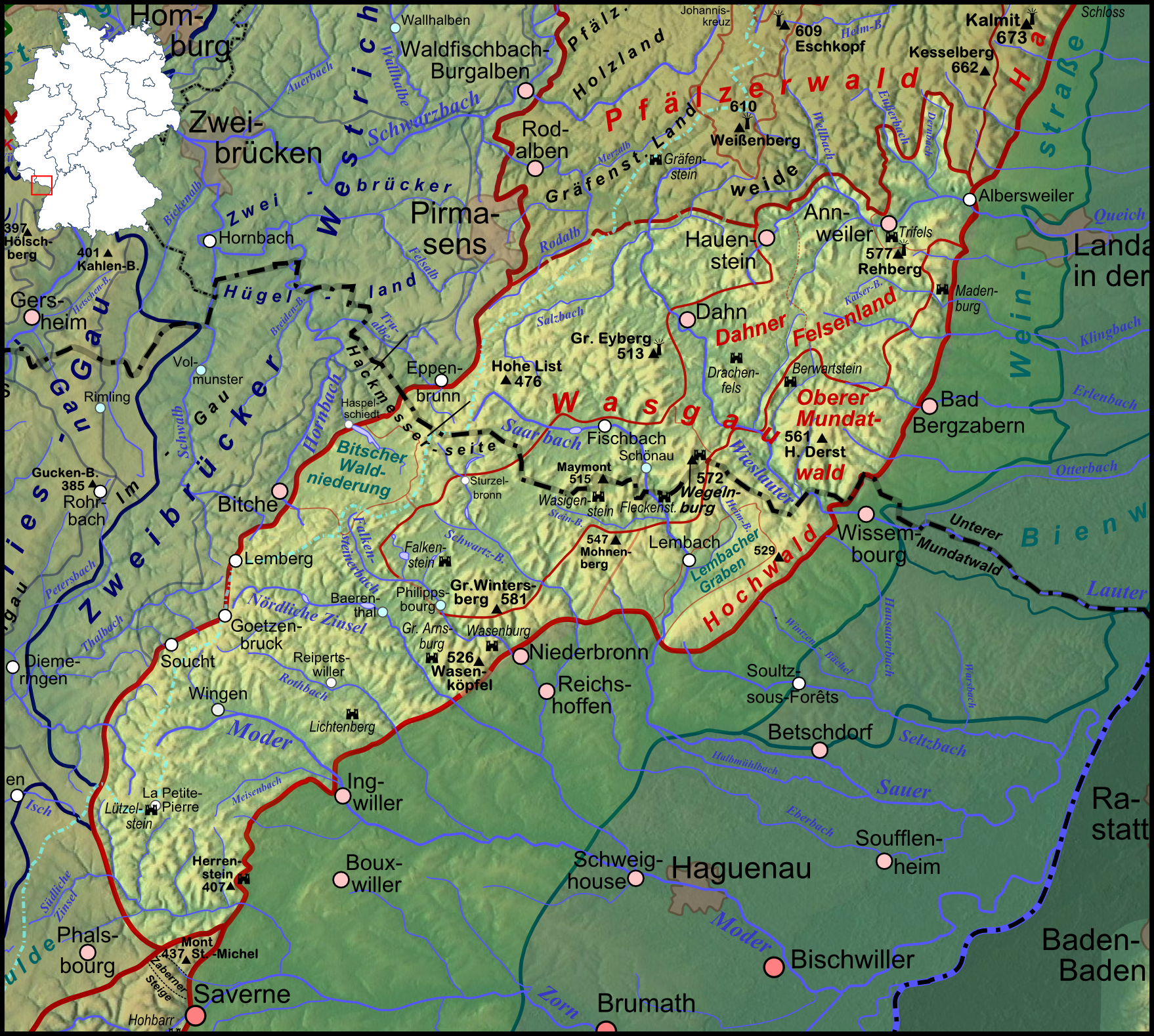
- Location of the Wasgau (highlit) in the southern Palatine Forest and northern Vosges
- State(s): Rhineland-Palatinate (Germany); Départements of Bas-Rhin and Moselle (France)
- Range coordinates: 49°02′54″N 7°39′44″E
- Parent range: of the Palatine Forest (south) and the Vosges (north)

Geology
- Rock age(s): Bunter sandstone 251–243 M years ago Zechstein 256–251 M years ago
- Rock type(s): Rock units bunter sandstone and Zechstein

The Wasgau (German: Wasgau, French: Vasgovie) is a Franco-German hill range in the German state of Rhineland-Palatinate and the French departments of Bas-Rhin and Moselle. It is formed from the southern part of the Palatine Forest and the northern part of the Vosges mountains, and extends from the River Queich in the north over the French border to the Col de Saverne in the south.

The highest hill in the entire Wasgau is the Grand Wintersberg (581 m above NHN) near Niederbronn-les-Bains in northern Alsace. Next, at 577 m is the only slightly lower Rehberg near Annweiler in the South Palatinate, which is the highest summit on German soil in the Wasgau.

The Wasgau forms the southern part of the Palatine Forest-North Vosges Biosphere Reserve.

== Geography ==
=== Location ===
The Wasgau runs from a line between Pirmasens and Landau in the north that, from Wilgartswiesen coincides with the course of the River Queich, to the Col de Saverne and a line between Phalsbourg to Saverne in the south. Its eastern boundary, running from Albersweiler in the Queich valley via Bad Bergzabern, Wissembourg in Alsace and Niederbronn-les-Bains to Saverne is the edge of the Rhine Graben. In the west the hills transition smoothly into the landscape region of the Westrich Plateau; from there the younger rock strata of the muschelkalk cover the bunter sandstone that dominates the Wasgau. This natural boundary runs roughly from Pirmasens via Eppenbrunn, Bitche and Lemberg in Lorraine towards the south and, near Phalsbourg, finally reaches the fault zone of the narrow Col de Saverne; this separates the Wasgau from the "real" (North) Vosges immediately to the south, although this transition is rather gradual and the dividing line not particularly clear.

A central sub-region of the Wasgau is the Dahn-Annweilerer-Wasgauer Felsenland, which extends from the Queich valley near Annweiler in the northeast to the area of the Falkensteinerbach stream and Zinsel du Nord near Baerenthal and Philippsbourg in the southwest.

=== Structure ===
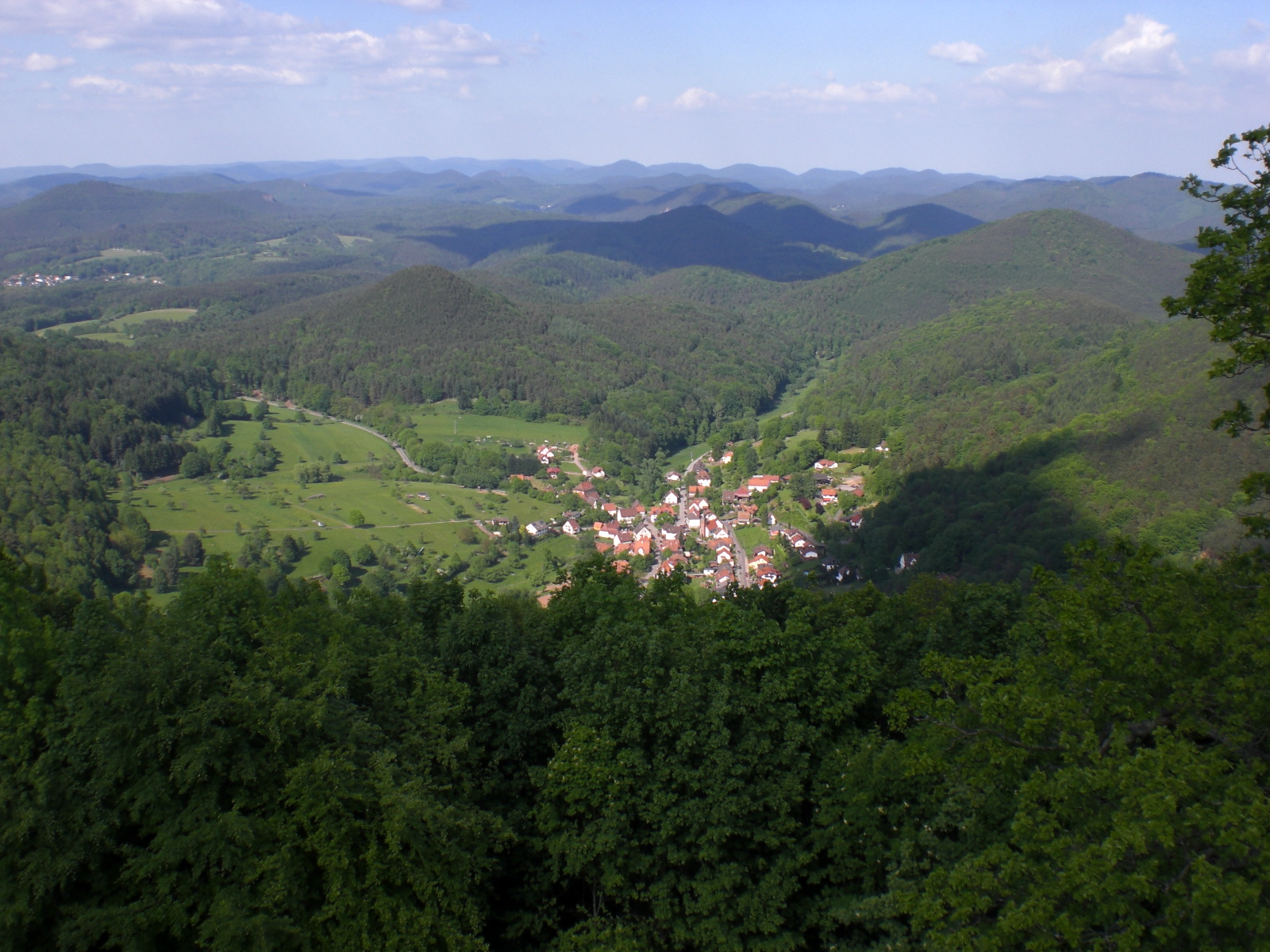
The small-scale structure of the Wasgau: View from the Hohenburg looking north

The uplands of the Wasgau differ from those of the central Palatine Forest that border it to the north. The landscape of the Wasgau has a characteristically variable nature, with numerous conical hills (Kegelberge) as well as clearly rounded domes (Kuppen). Between the hills are conspicuously level plains, some of them extensive.

The Wasgau is drained mostly towards the east by left-hand tributaries of the River Rhine, namely the Queich, the Lauter (called the Wieslauter in its upper reaches) and the Saarbach, which continues as the Sauer in North Alsace. setzt. There it is followed by the Moder, whose catchment area extends southwards via its right-hand tributary, the Zorn, beyond the Col de Saverne.

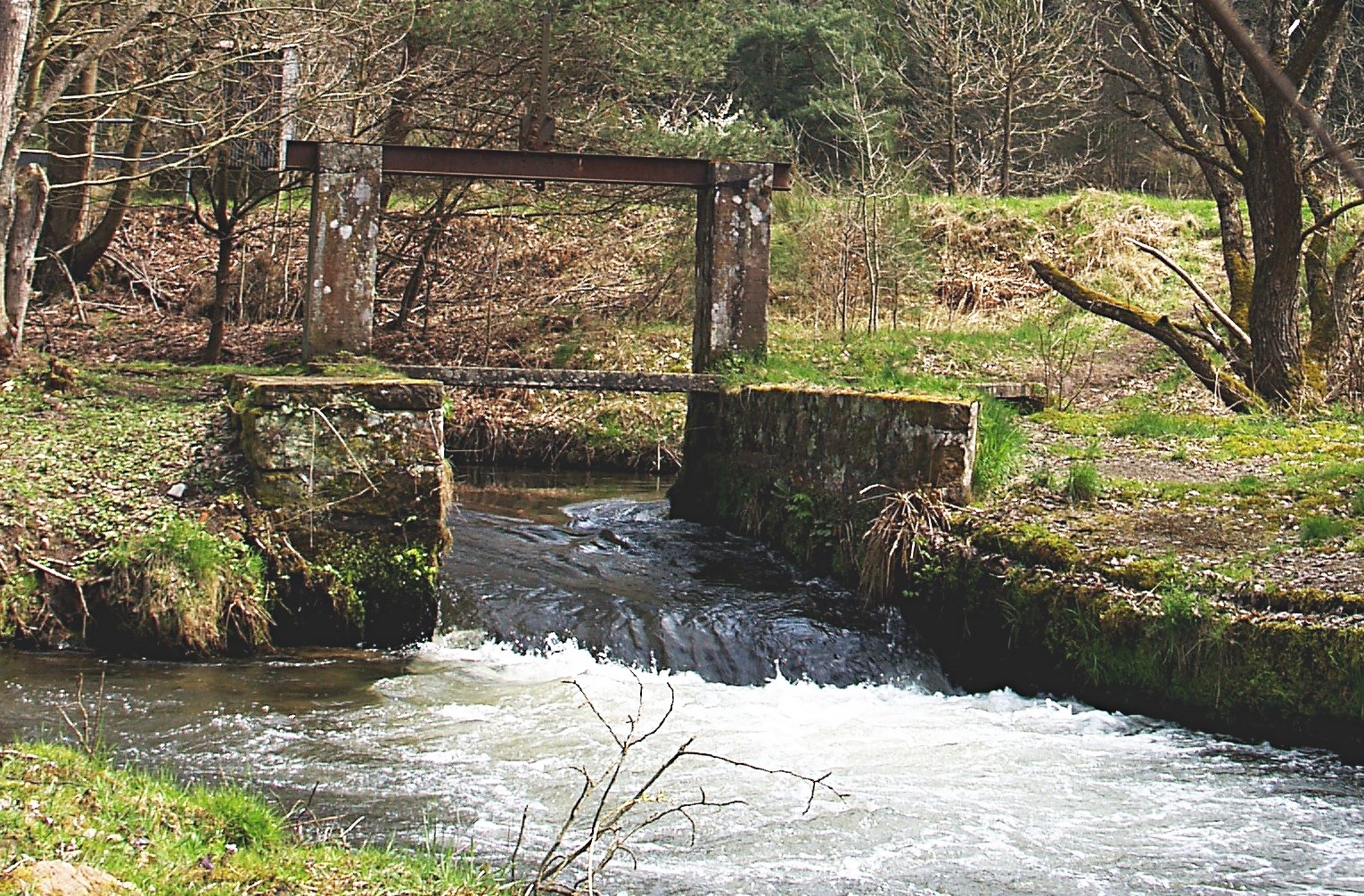
A former timber rafting weir on the Wieslauter at a splash dam north of Dahn

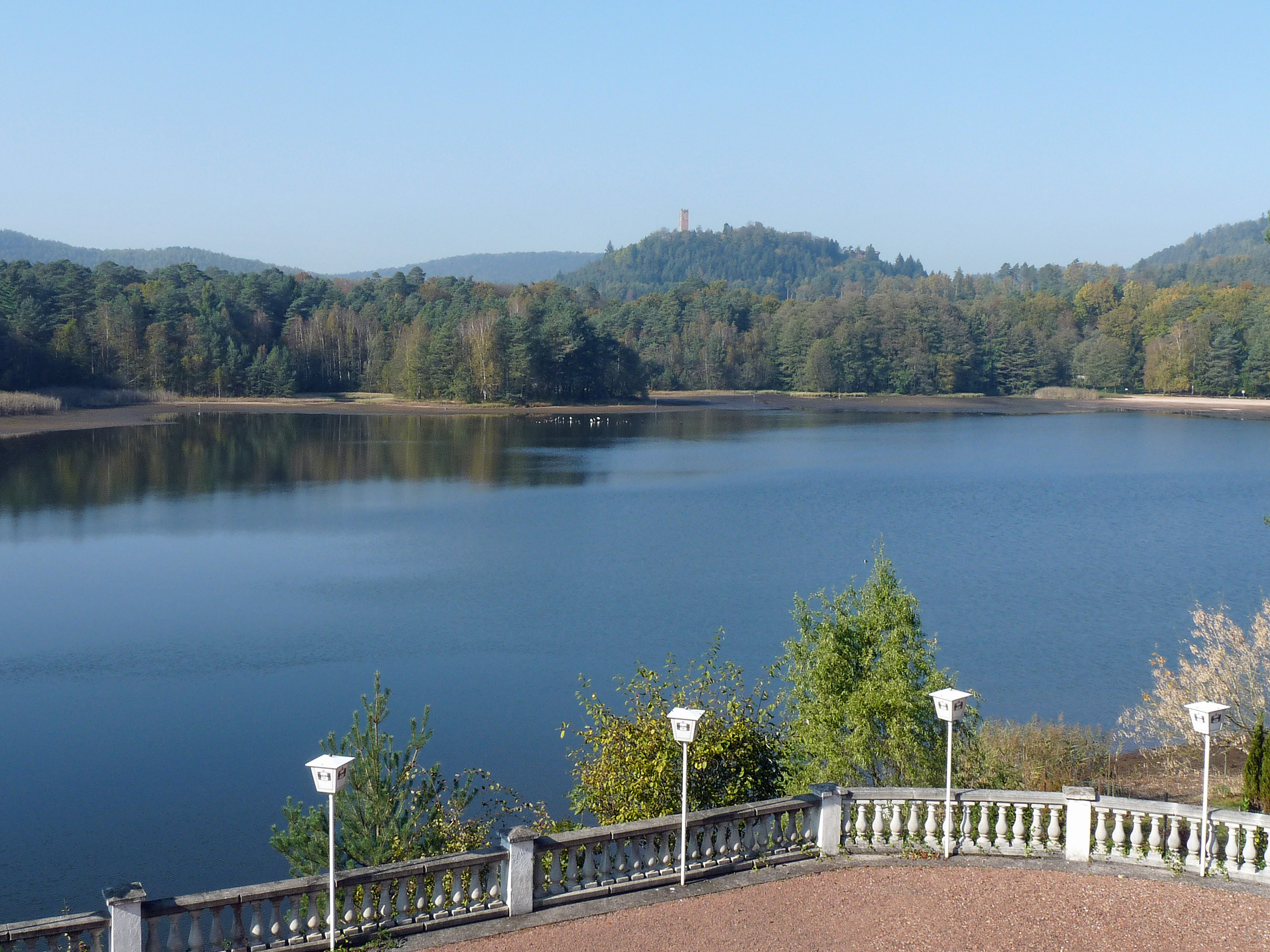
The Hanauer Weiher with Waldeck Castle in the background

There are no natural lakes in the Wasgau, but especially in the area of the Saarbach stream, historic ponds or woogs have survived from the Middle Ages. These are small lakes that were artificially created to breed fish or to utilize their water in the operation of watermills or iron hammer mills. The water of the Zinsel du Nord near Baerenthal in the Pays de Bitche was used during the 18th and 19th centuries for processing iron in the ironworks and blast furnaces. To that end, several larger and smaller ponds were laid out between Mouterhouse and Baerenthal, which have been mainly used for tourism since the closure of the last ironworks in 1923. Even the Étang de Hanau, a pond a few miles east of Bitche in Éguelshardt has become a major tourist centre with swimming facilities, boat rentals and camping.

Splash dams (ecluses) were constructed, for example on the Wieslauter stream, as part of the timber rafting industry, that was practised until the end of the 19th century. These dams were able to trap logs after temporary flooding which, after the opening of a weir could be transported downstream on the water.

=== Hills ===
==== General ====
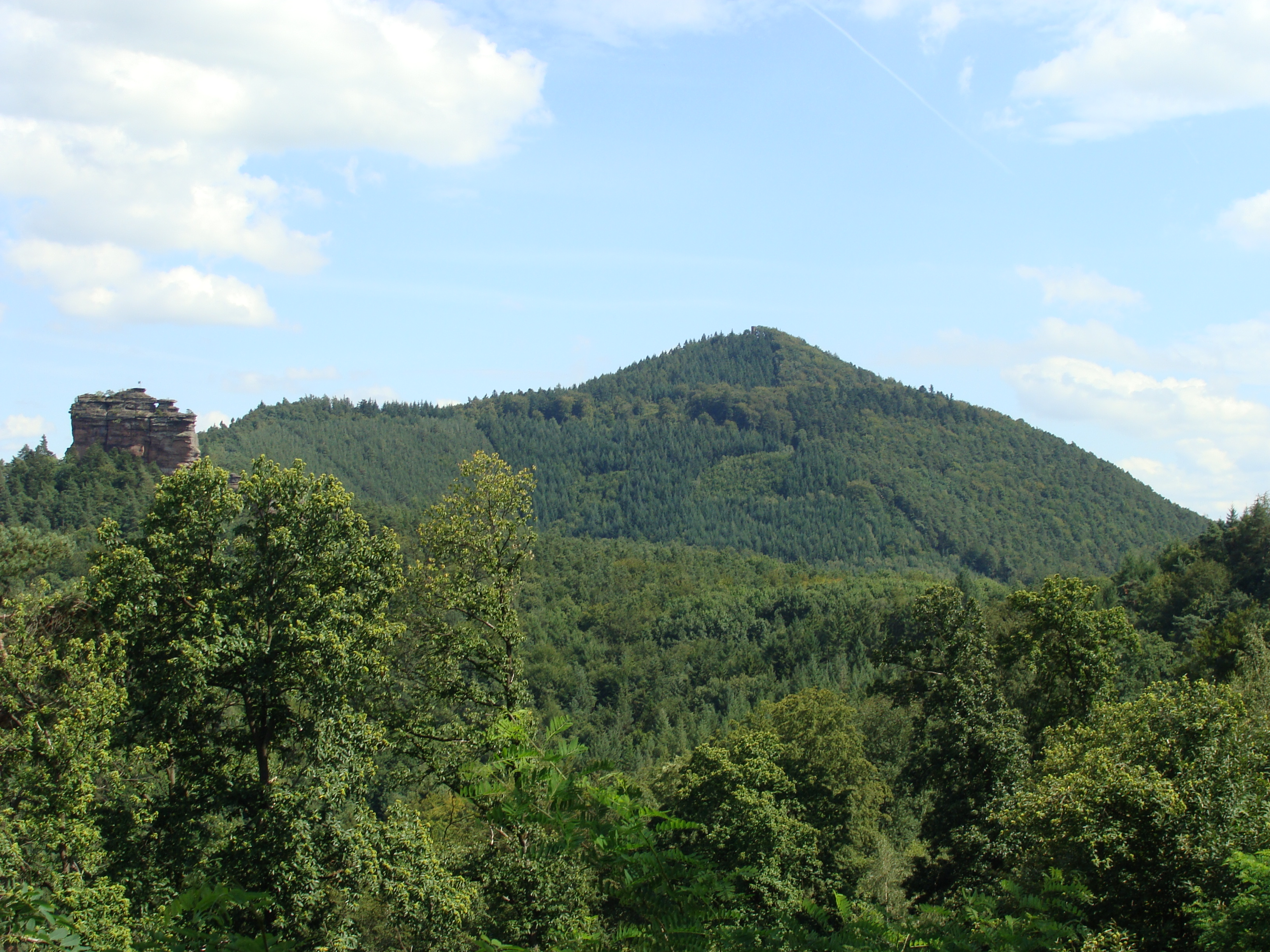
The Rehberg (577 m), the highest hill on German soil in the Wasgau

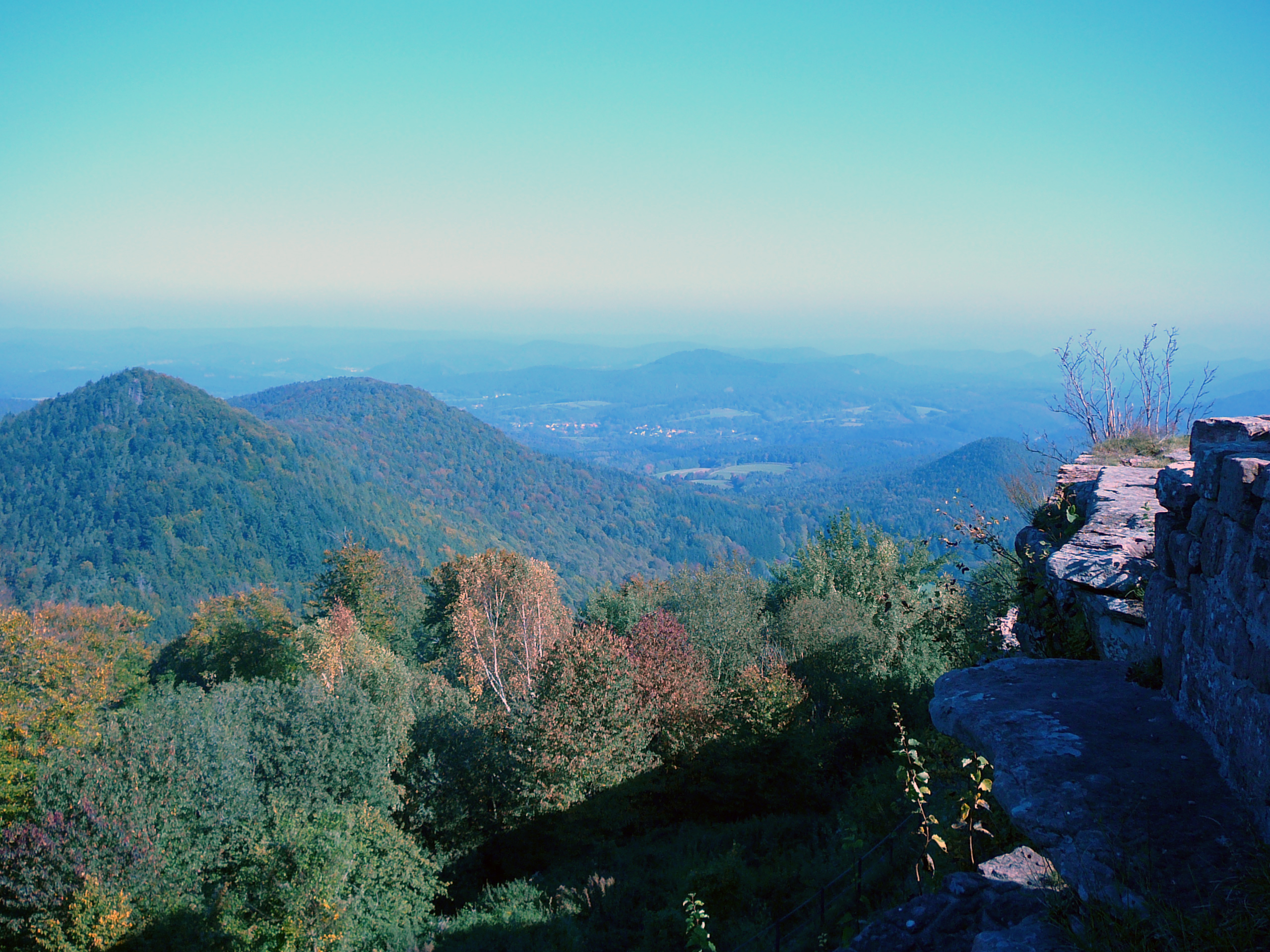
View from the Wegelnburg over the Wasgau Felsenland

Due to its small-scale relief, the uplands of the Wasgau are characterized by considerable diversity of forms with rather isolated individual peaks - particularly the conical hills or Kegelberge - which reach an average height of 400–500 metres above sea level. The highest peaks are in the northern and central Wasgau (such as the Wegelnburg, 572 m, and the Mohnenberg, 547 m), especially near the edge of the Rhine trough (e.g. the Grand Winterberg, 581 m, and the Rehberg, 577 m), while the bunter sandstone block in the west and south descends from about 500 m (Wasenkoepfel, 526 m and Großer Eyberg, 513 m) to an average of about 350–400 m at the Saverne. Also typical is the number of variably shaped rock formations, mainly rocks of the Lower Triassic sandstone, the Trifels and Rehberg beds, that are found on many hills in the Wasgau (see the sections on Geology and rock formations). In his typology of mountain and rock formations of the Wasgau, Geiger distinguishes the following six forms: hill blocks with rock outcrops, table hills; rock slabs; ridges with rock faces, hill cones with rock blocks; hill cones with rock towers and domed hills. In addition there is a host of hilltop observation towers (e.g. on the Grand Wintersberg, Rehberg, Stäffelsberg and Wasenkoepfel) that offer visitors a 360° panorama.

=== Detailed overview ===
The columns in the table are based on the Natural Region Division Concept of the Wasgau. Each column shows the important hills of each sub-region in order of height.

Western Wasgau	Wasgau Felsenland	Eastern Wasgau	Southern Wasgau
Gr. Eyberg (513 m)	Grand Wintersberg (581 m); Ger: Großer Wintersberg	Hohe Derst (561 m)	Wasenkoepfel (526 m)
Gr. Mückenkopf (485 m)	Rehberg (577 m)	Mohnenberg (547 m)	Immenkopf (494 m)
Hohe List (476 m)	Wegelnburg (572 m)	Bobenthaler Knopf (534 m)	Arnsberg (479 m)
Erlenkopf (472 m)	Hohenbourg (551 m); Ger: Hohenburg	Brissetischer Kopf (529 m) or Brissetish Kopf	Mont Saint-Michel (437 m); Ger: Michaelsberg
Hoher Kopf (467 m)	Schwobberg (524 m)	Schletterberg (521 m)	Hochkopf (429 m)
Braunsberg (463 m)	Maimont (515 m)	Dürrenberg (521 m)	Hollaenderberg (423 m)
Gr. Stephansberg (456 m)	Wasserstein (512 m)	Krummer Ellenbogen (515 m)	(Hoch) Ebersberg (423 m)
Hoher Warsberg (451 m)	Engenteich (496 m)	Mittelkopf (515 m)	Duerrberg(kopf) (421 m)
Kl. Biesenberg (451 m)	Jüngstberg (491 m)	Treutelsberg (505 m)	Hochfirst (421 m)

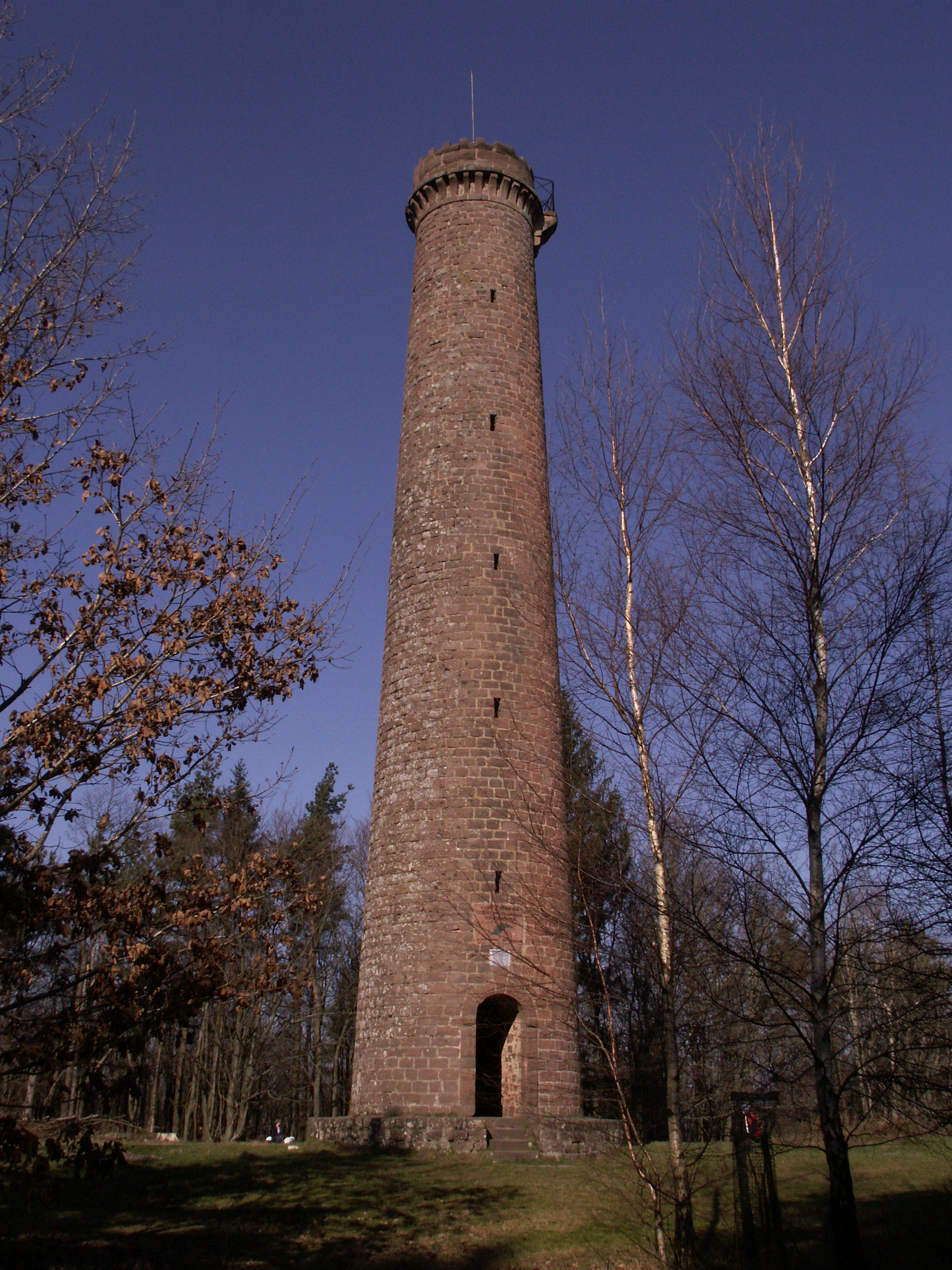
Observation tower on the Grand Wintersberg (Wasgau Felsenland)

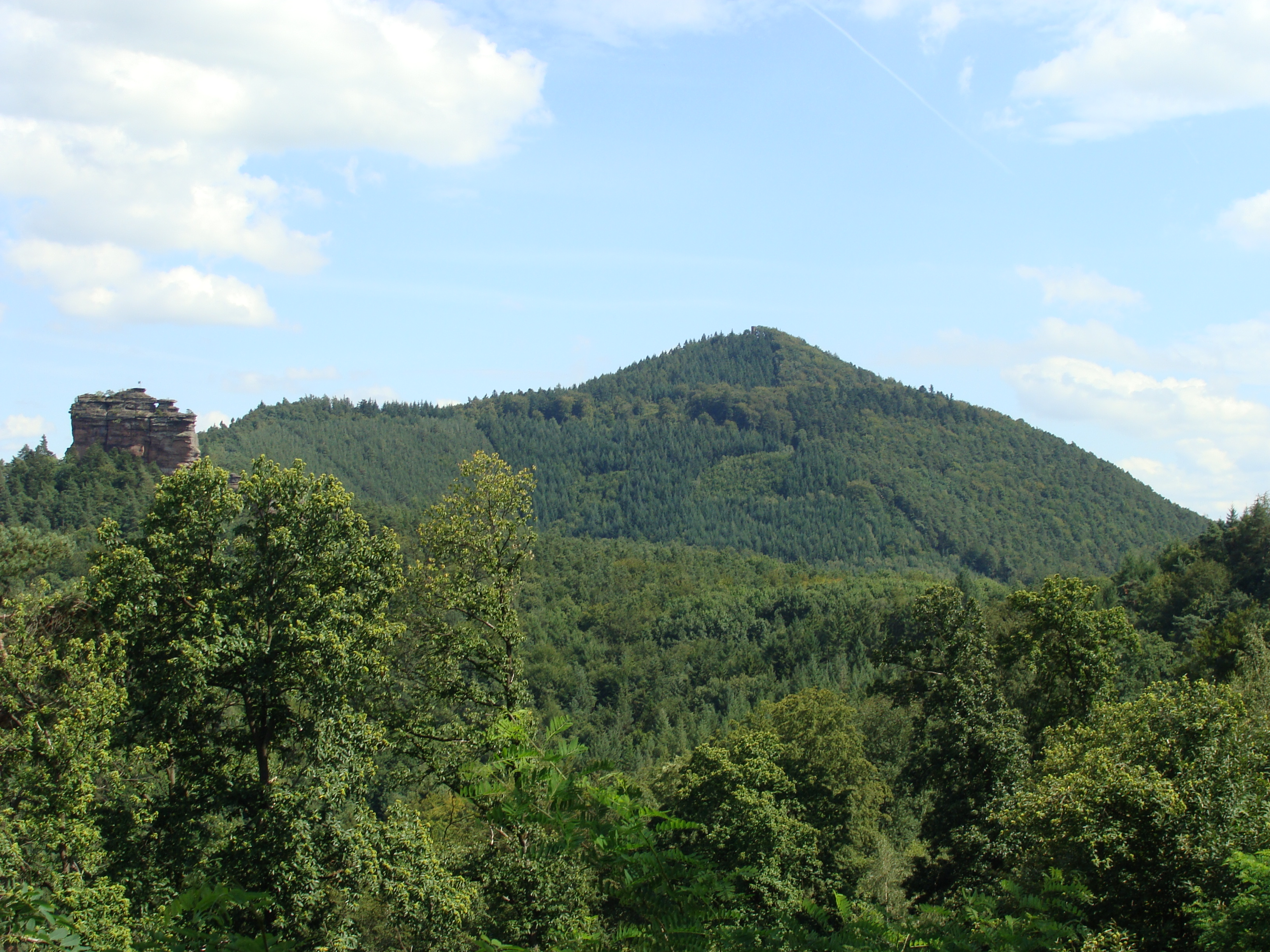
The Rehberg and Asselstein (left) (Wasgau Felsenland)

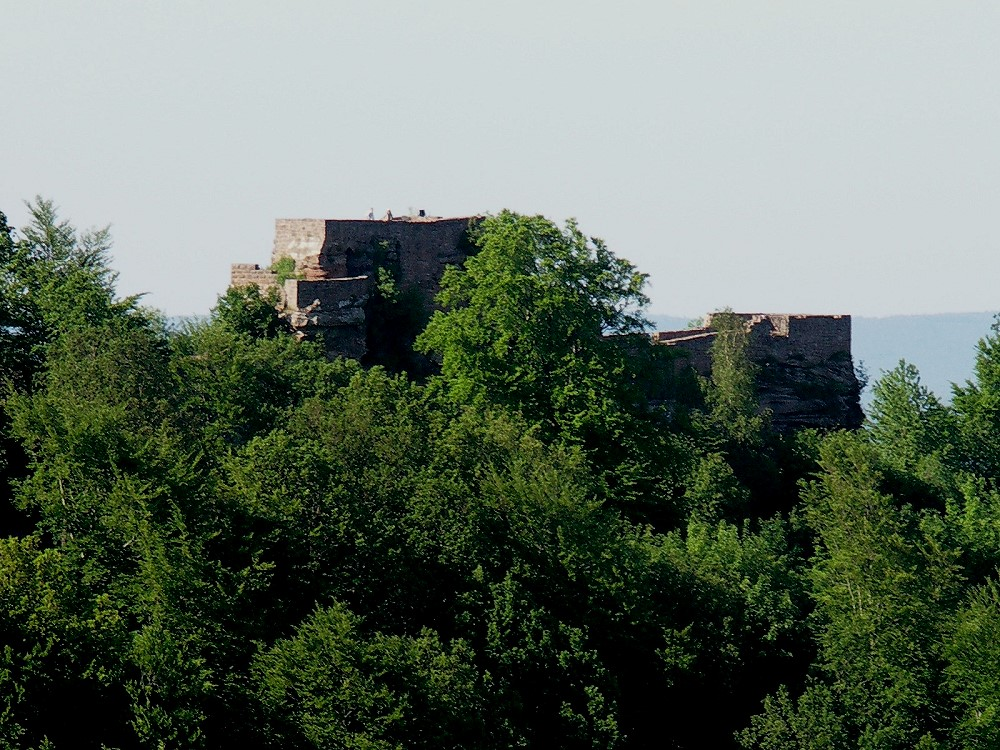
The Schlossberg (Wegelnburg) (Wasgau Felsenland)

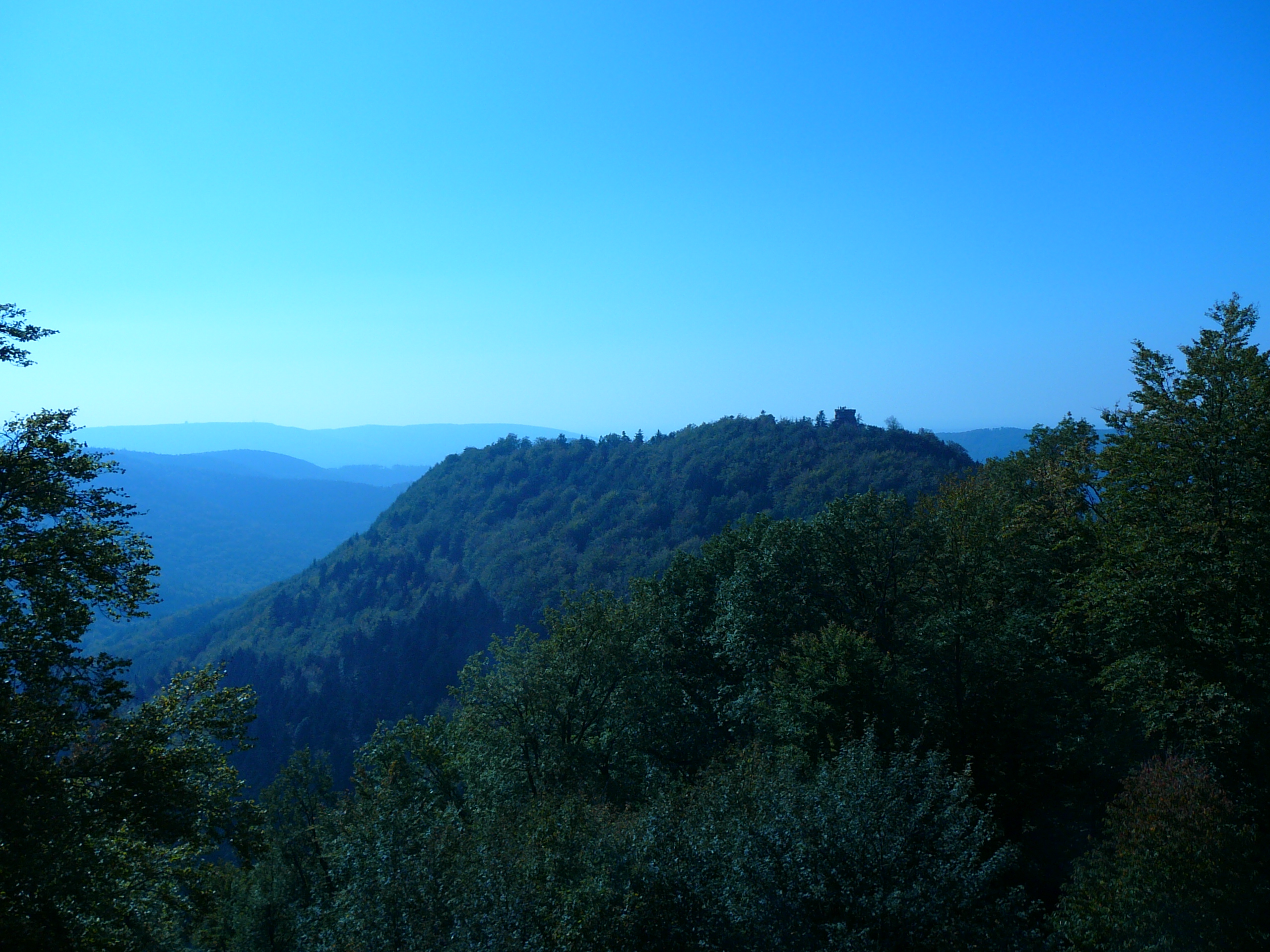
The Schlossberg (Hohenburg) (Wasgau Felsenland): view from the Wegelnburg

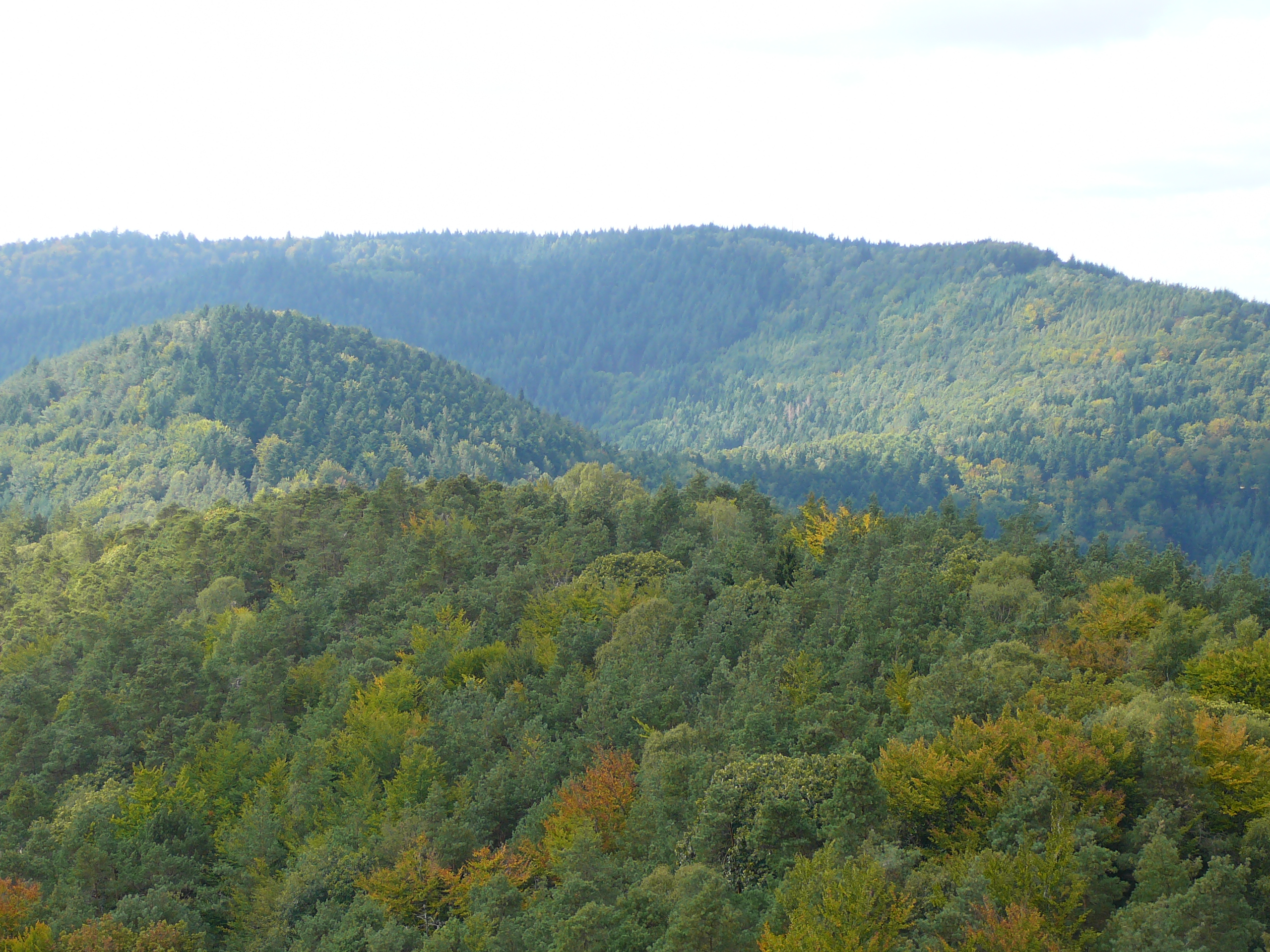
Hohe Derst (eastern Wasgau): view from the Stäffelsberg

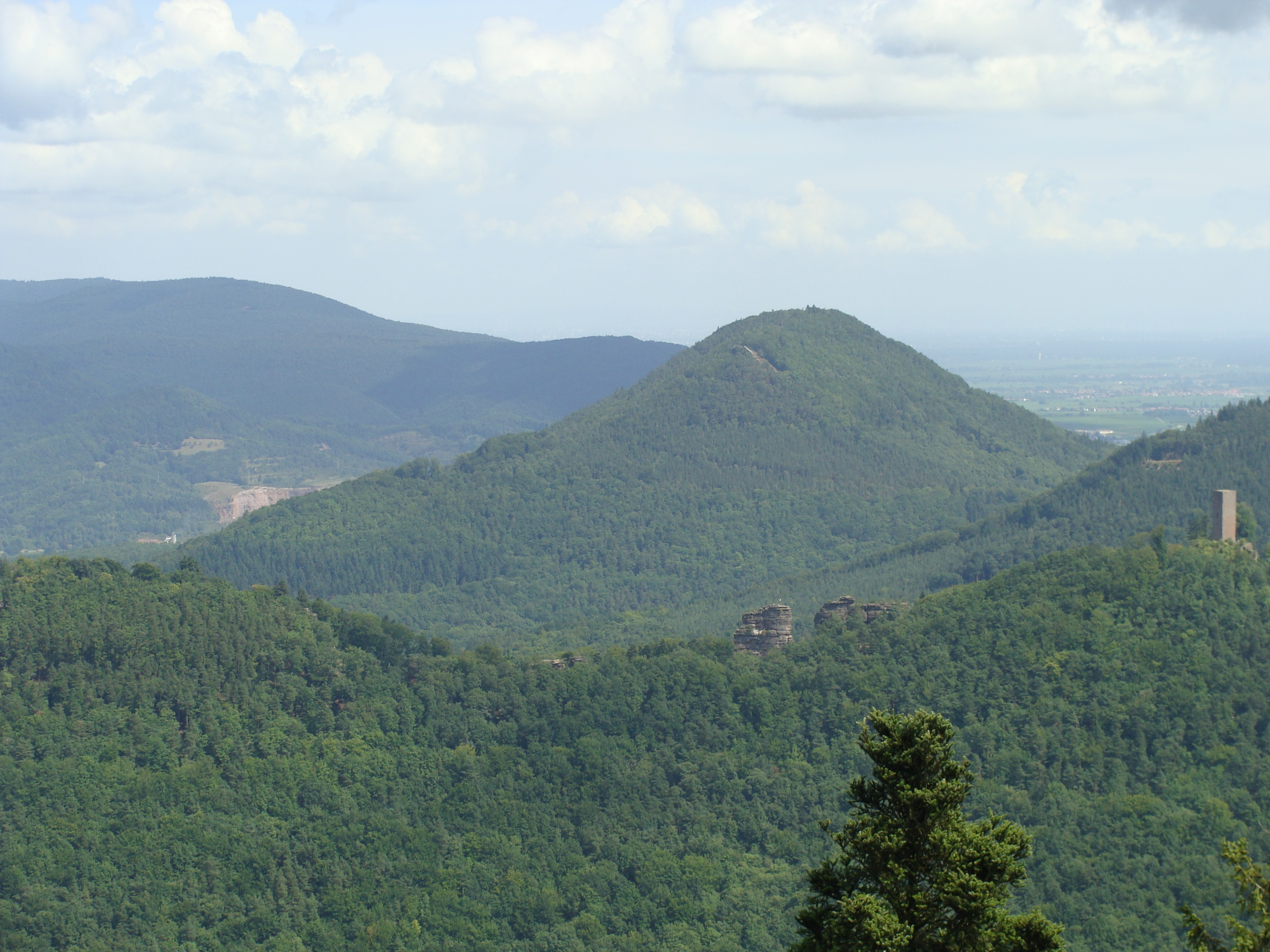
The Hohenberg (eastern Wasgau): view from the Rehberg

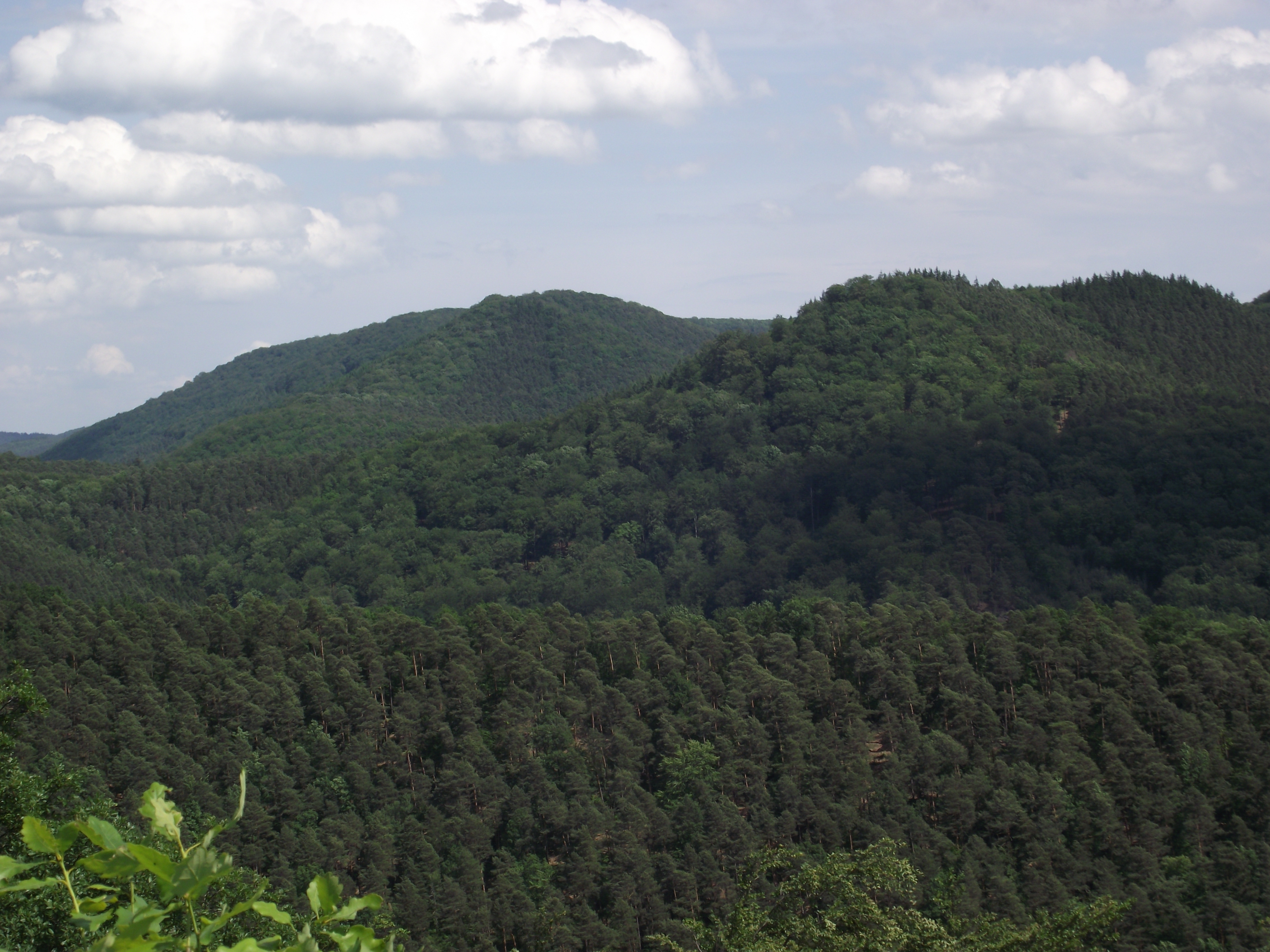
The Mohnenberg (eastern Wasgau): view from Schöneck Castle

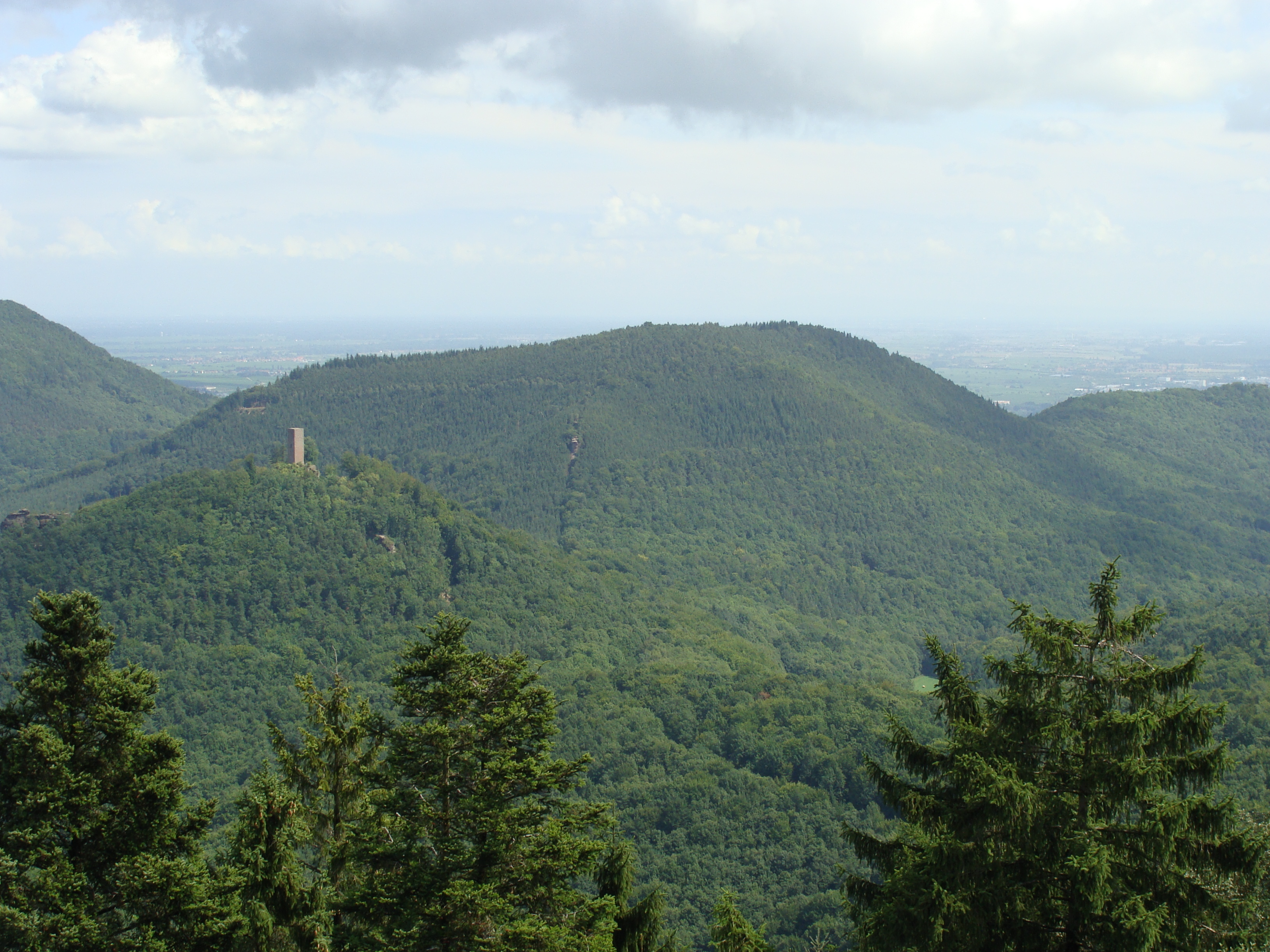
The Föhrlenberg (eastern Wasgau): view from the Rehberg

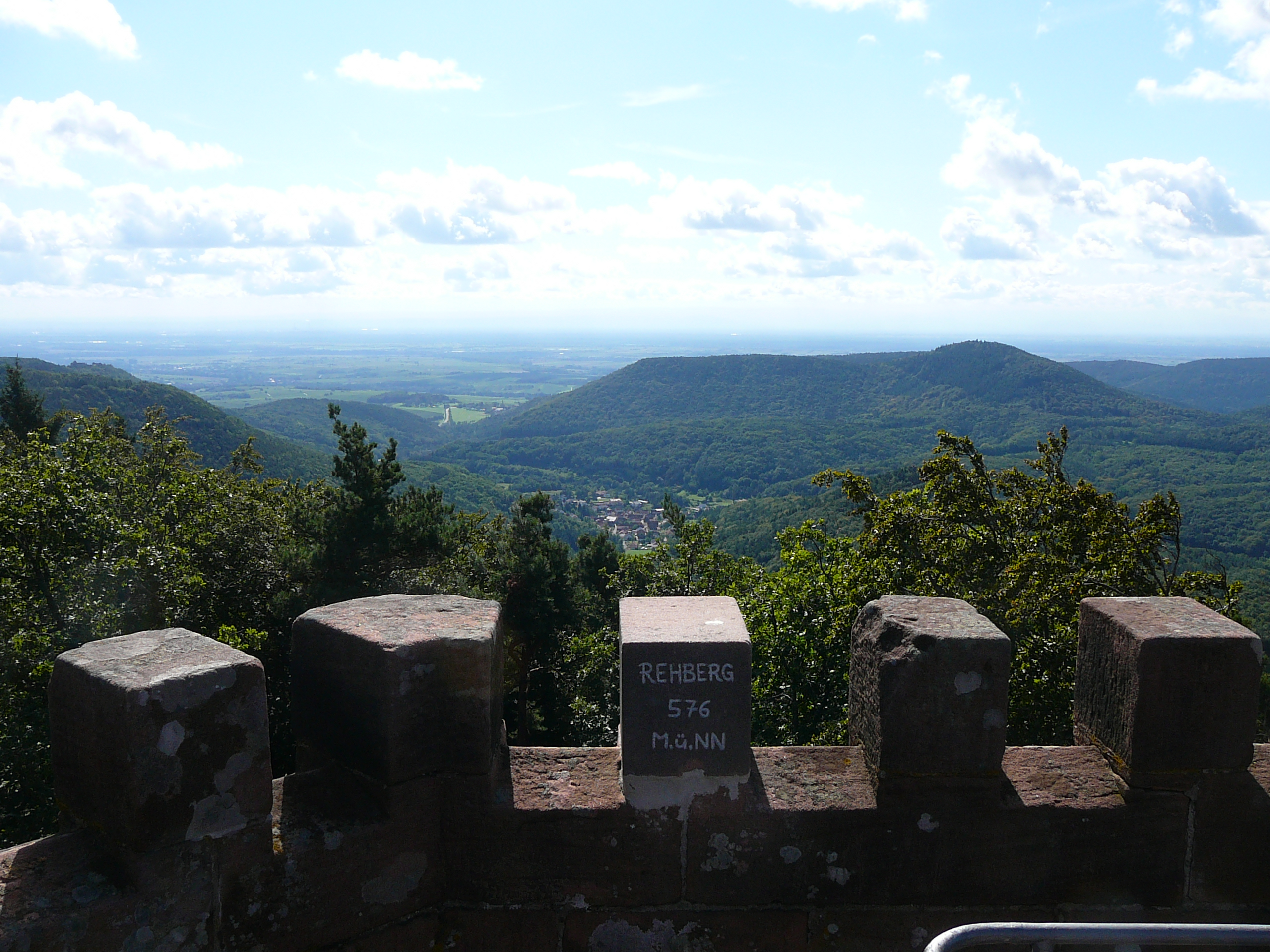
View from the Rehberg towards Treutelsberg (eastern Wasgau)

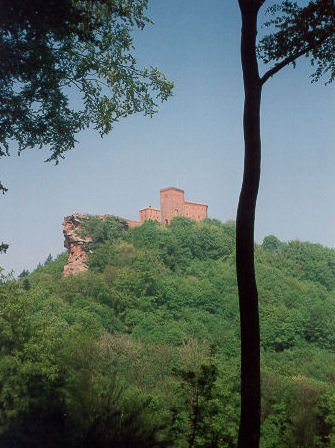
The Sonnenberg and Trifels Castle (Wasgau Felsenland)

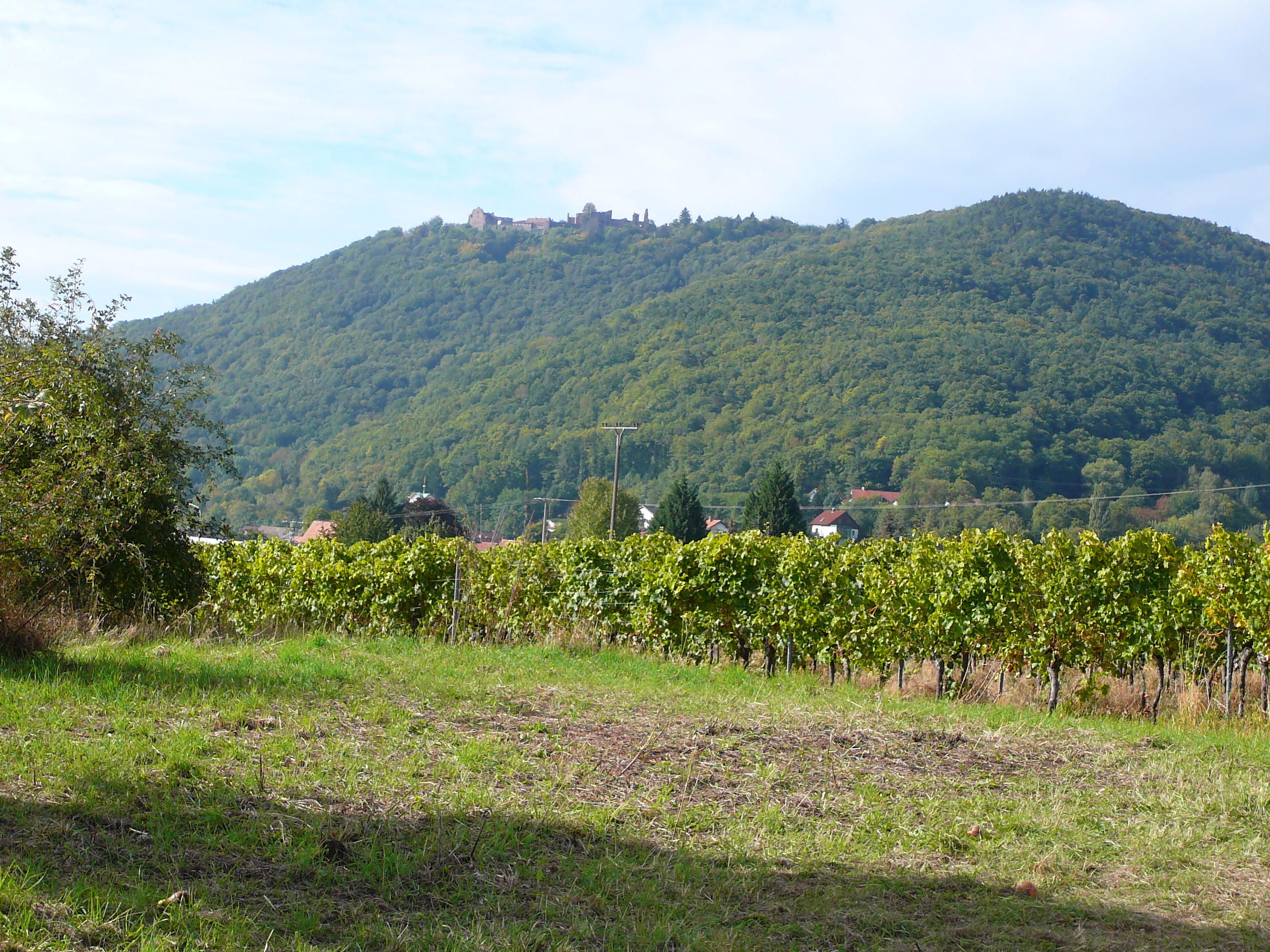
The Rothenberg mit Madenburg (eastern Wasgau)

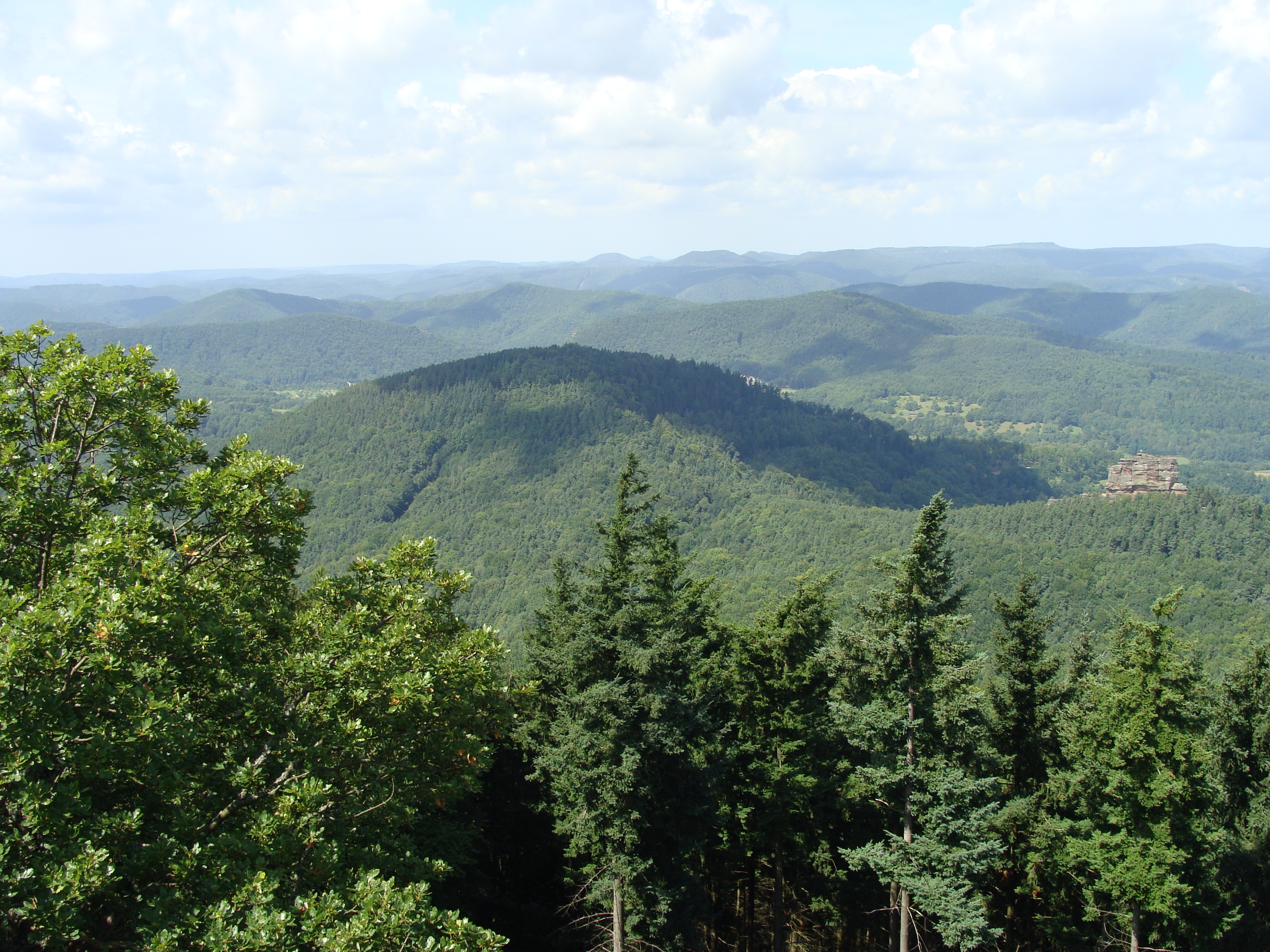
The Ebersberg (Wasgau Felsenland): view from the Rehberg

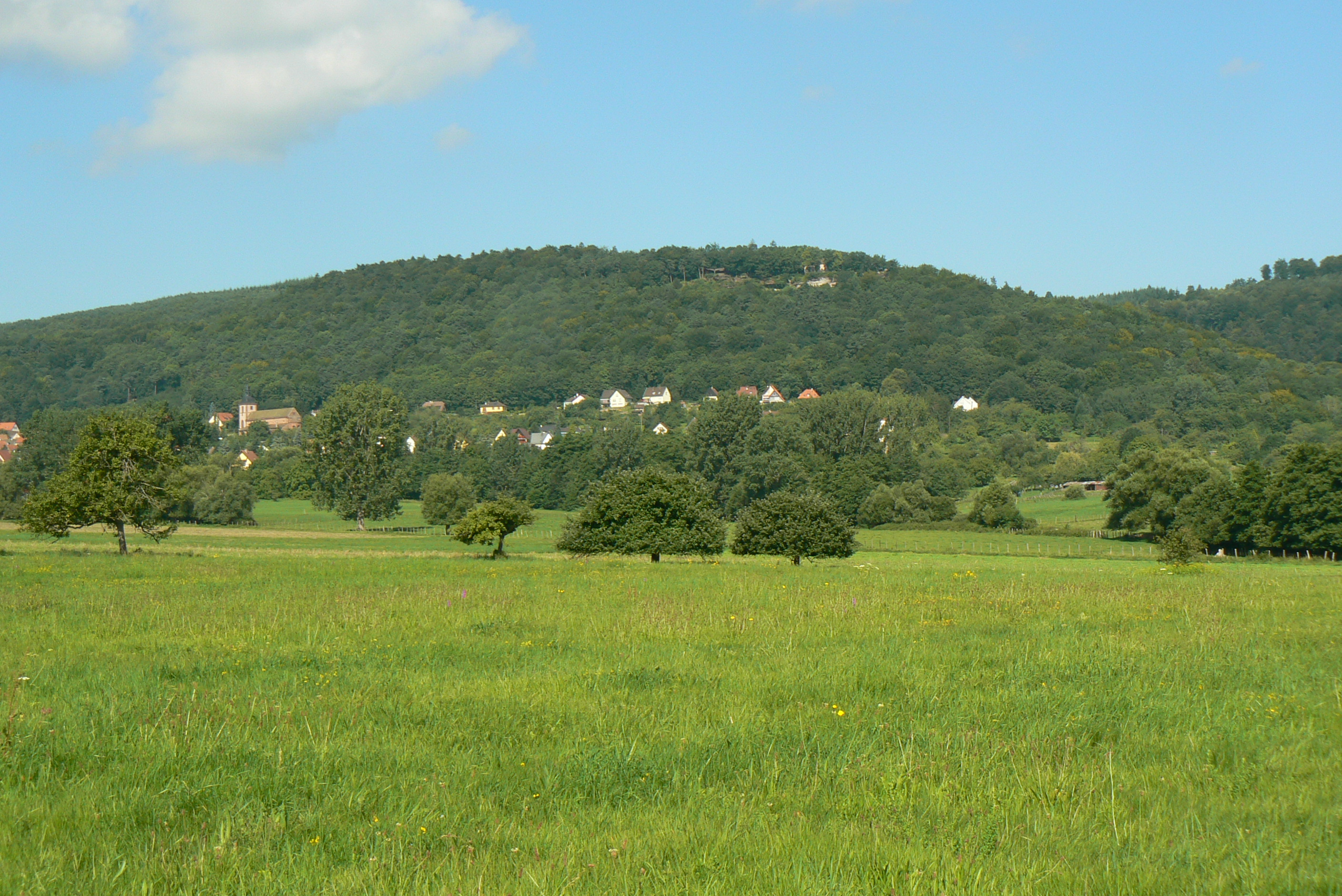
View from Saint-Jean-Saverne of Mont Saint-Michel (southern Wasgau)

== Geology ==
=== Formation and deposition of the rock strata ===
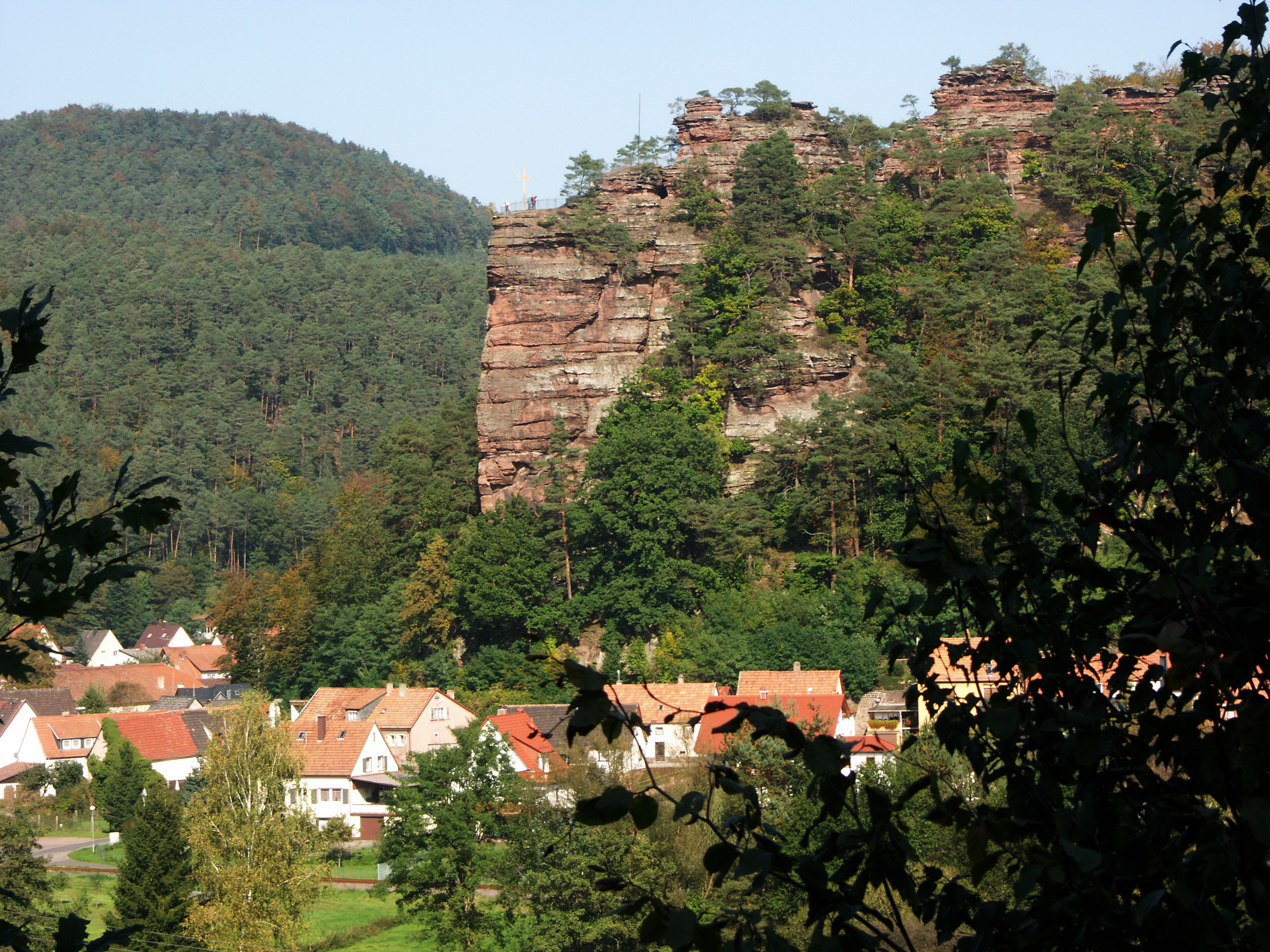
Trifels strata visible on a rock terrace: the Jungfernsprung near Dahn

The Wasgau, as part of the Palatine Forest and the North Vosges, is characterized by rock strata of bunter sandstone and, to a lesser extent, Zechstein, which was deposited in the late Permian (256–251 million years ago) and early Triassic (251–243 million years ago), predominantly under desert-like climatic conditions. Sedimentary sequences were formed with a thickness of about 500 metres, of different strengths, thicknesses and colouring, and comprising mainly strongly hardened, silica-cemented, medium- and coarse-grained sandstones, but also some fine-grained sandstones, bonded with clay cement, and shales. These rocks are divided into various strata that, in the case of the bunter sandstone region, comprise Lower, Middle and Upper levels.

During the formation of the Upper Rhine Graben in the Paleogene period (66–23.8 million years ago), these rock strata experienced tectonically induced displacements that have had a significance impact on the appearance of the landscape of the Wasgau today. At that time the edges of the Rhine Graben were uplifted and the layers of bunter sandstone and, in places also older rocks (Zechstein, Rotliegendes) were exposed after the overlying rock was eroded away. This resulted in tilting, bulging (thrusting and folding) and the fracturing (formation of faults) of the various rock strata.

=== Development of the present topography ===
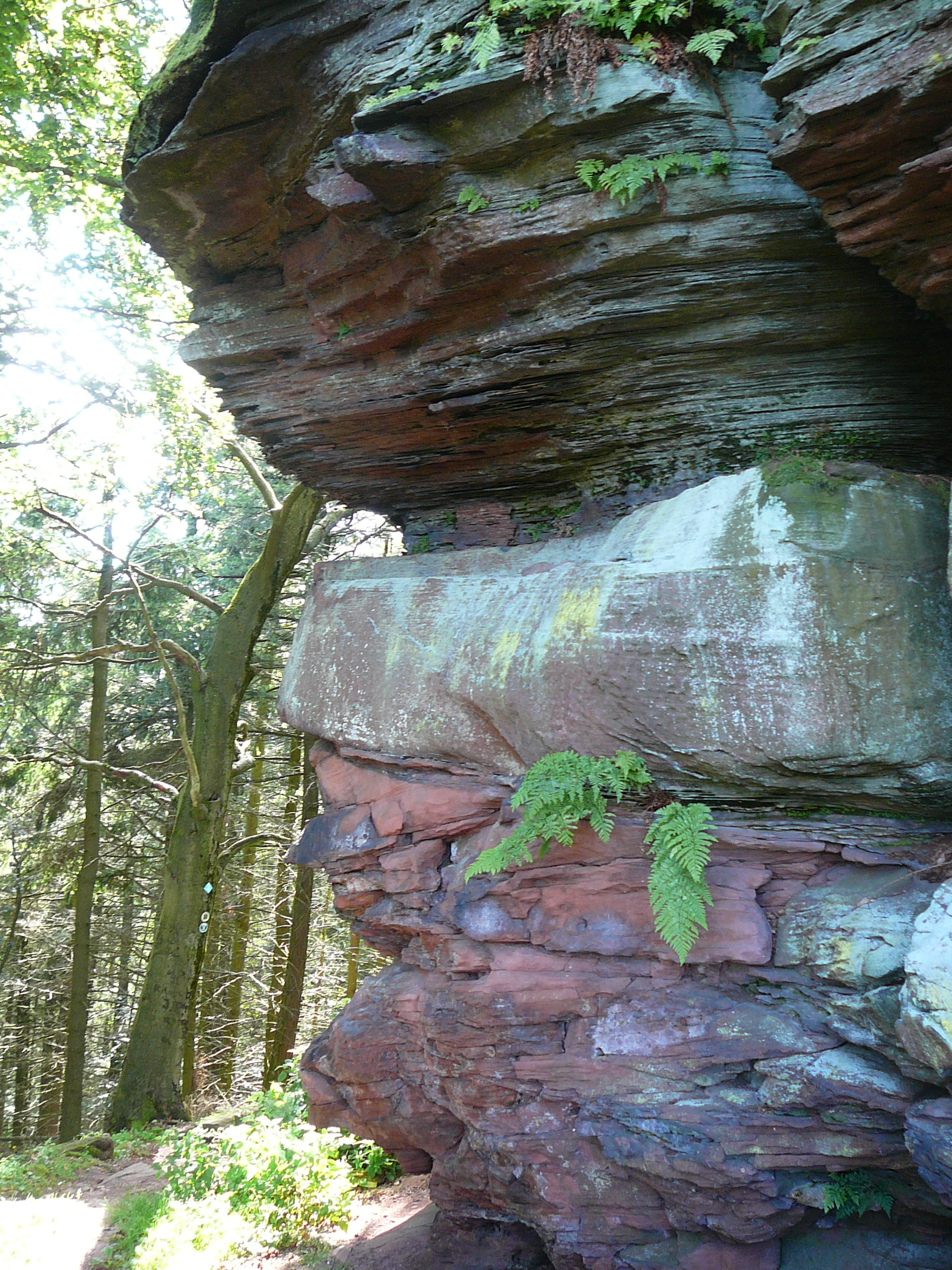
Summit region of the Rehberg: rock formations of the Rehberg beds

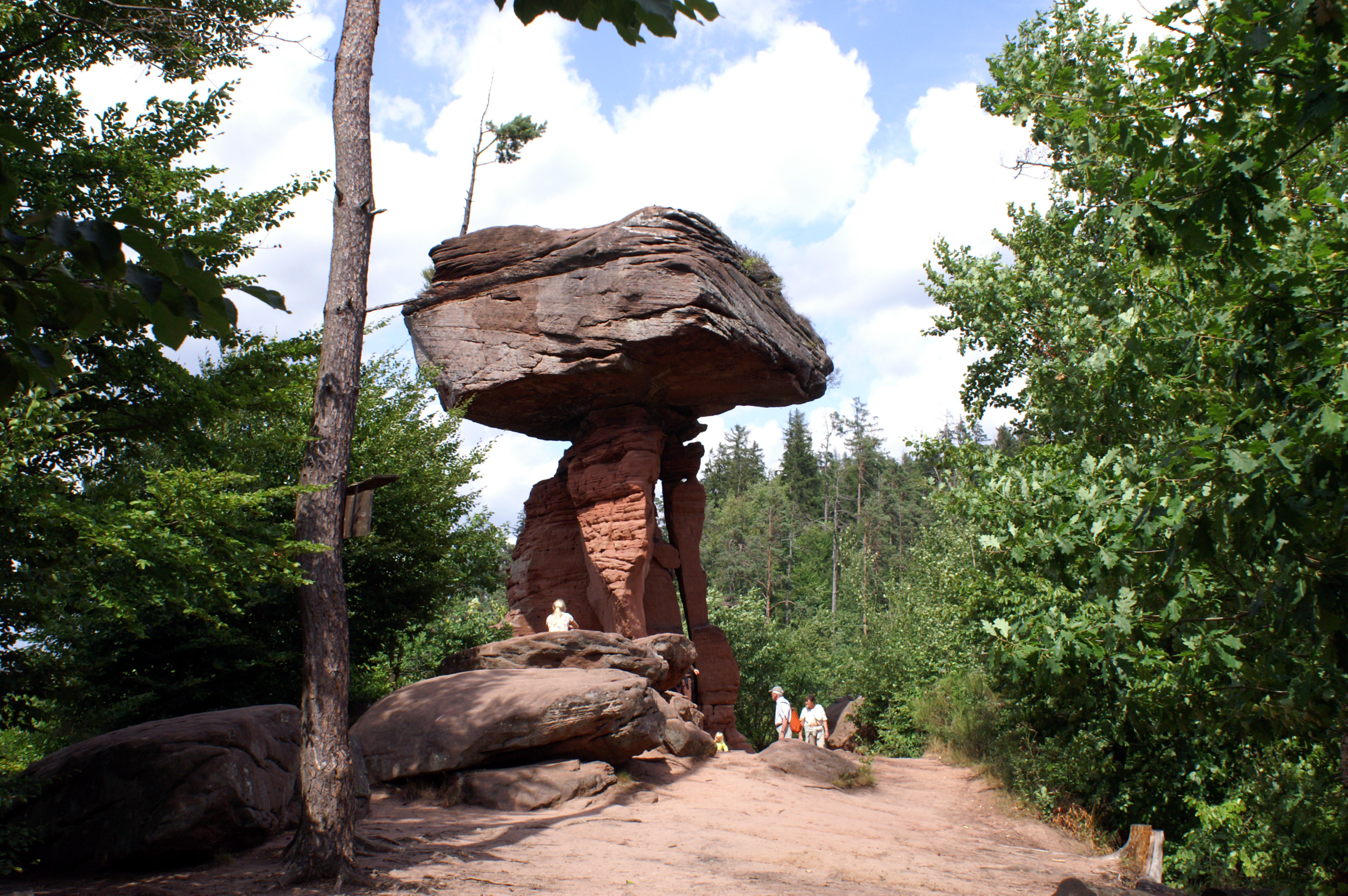
Small scale weathering in the Rehberg beds: the Devil's Table

Due to the synclinal-anticlinal structure of the hills on the left bank of the Rhine which runs from southwest to northeast, these bulges in the northern and central parts of the Wasgau, i.e. in the region of the South Palatine Saddle (Südpfälzer Sattel) are particularly prominent, with the result that their surface layers were more heavily eroded. Because the formations of the Zechstein, for example, the Annweiler and Speyerbach beds, consist more of fine-grained sandstones with clayey binding and shales and therefore have a softer consistency, this material could be more easily carried awayl leaving the older rocks of the Zechstein and Rotliegendes exposed. This resulted in erosion surfaces and broad valleys, as are particularly characteristic of the northeastern Wasgau, for example, in Gossersweiler and Völkersweiler, also in Hauenstein, Busenberg or Fischbach bei Dahn. At the same time, parts of the Lower Bunter Sandstone, the so-called Trifels and Rehberg beds remained, because they mostly consist of harder quartz sandstone and are therefore particularly resistant to weathering and erosion. The micro-relief of the Wasgau was developed during the Neogene period (23.8 to 2.8 million years ago), and especially the Quaternary period (2.8 to 0.01 million years ago), as a result of erosion, that is characterized by diversely-shaped, often conical and isolated hills with bizarre rock formations (the Wasgau Rock Country or Wasgau Felsenland). This rock country extends from Annweiler in the northeast roughly to the stream of the Falkensteiner Bach at Phillipsburg in the southwest and forms the actual core area of the Wasgau.

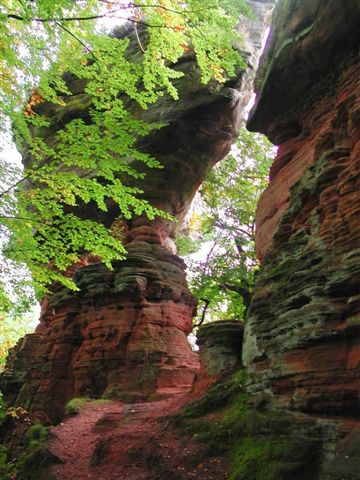
Middle Bunter Sandstone with Karlstal beds and Upper Rock zone: the Altschlossfelsen rocks near Eppenbrunn

Had the rock strata been undisturbed, the typical landscape structure of the rock country would end shortly after Annweiler due to their inclination. Tectonic processes, however, led to the shifting and displacement of individual layers of rock so that, west of the Elmstein Fault roughly from Wilgartswiesen, Spirkelbach, Schwanheim Erlenbach, Niederschlettenbach up to Lembach in Alsace the rock forming Trifels beds were uplifted by about 80 to 100 metres and so these rocks continue to shape the surface of the landscape in the Dahner Felsenland and Schönau Felsenland. Only west of the (Wies-)Lauter and Sauer or Saarbach do they dive permanently beneath the younger strata of the Middle Bunter Sandstein, for example, the Karlstal beds, so that the landscape of the western Wasgau appears similar to that of the Middle Palatinate Forest. This also applies to the southern part of Wasgau because, in the area of the Col de Saverne or Pfalzburg Trough (Pfalzburger Mulde) the various rock formations are less strongly arched and therefore their surface layers were not as severely eroded. For this reason, younger rocks of the Middle and Upper Bunter form the surface of the hills, whilst Rehberg and Trifels beds only occur in deep V-shaped valleys. Also, south of a line from Ingweiler through Wingen-sur-Moder to Diemeringen, the main distribution zone of Bunter sandstone from the eastern edge of the trough to the rocks of the Lower Muschelkalk in the west narrows from a width of about 15 km to a minimum of 7 km in the area of the Col de Saverne (see map above).

== Name and history ==
The names Wasgau and Vosges have the same linguistic source: the originally Celtic hill and forest god, Vosegus, who was adopted by the Romans who incorporated it into their Latin names for the region, Vosegus mons ("Vosegus Hill") and Silva Vosegus ("Vosegus Wood"). This name became the French Vosges, and the Middle High German Wasigen, which further evolved into Wasgau and Wasgenwald ("Wasgen Forest"). Linguistically these terms are also related to the Vôge region which is adjacent to the Vosges to the southwest, whose name derives from the feminine form *Vosagia.

Gradually the names branched and developed separately due to the Franco-German border. Today the Alsace-Lorraine part of the range is called the Vosges and the Palatine part is the Wasgau. During the time from 1871 to 1919, when Alsace and parts of Lorraine temporarily belonged to Germany, the Vosges was generally referred to as the Wasgenwald in order to emphasise the distance from the Roman-Latin term.

As part of the European treaty (Schengen Agreement), however, there is now a tendency to go the opposite way: both parts of the range are see as a single, cross-border, natural-regional and cultural-historical unit. So in addition to the use of the official landscape names of Vosges du Nord ("North Vosges") and Südlicher Pfälzerwald ("Southern Palatine Forest"), the range is called by the overall term of Wasgau or Vasgovie; in keeping with the historical development of the name, these terms are used not just for the Palatine, but also for the Alsace-Lorraine part of the region.

The so-called "South Route" (Südroute) of the historic Way of St. James used to run through the Wasgau; today it is more of touristic rather than religious significance.

== Sights ==
=== Castles ===
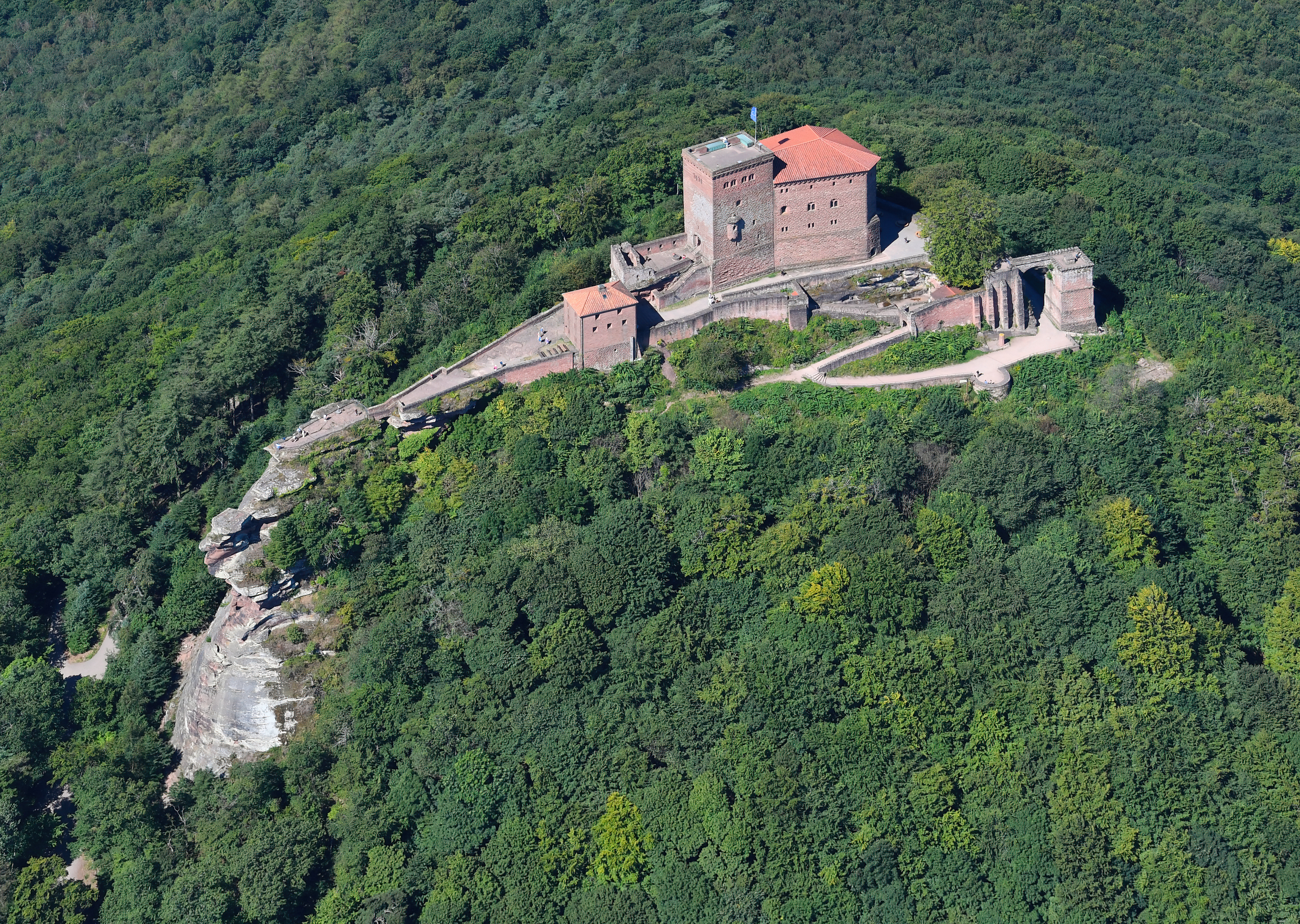
Trifels

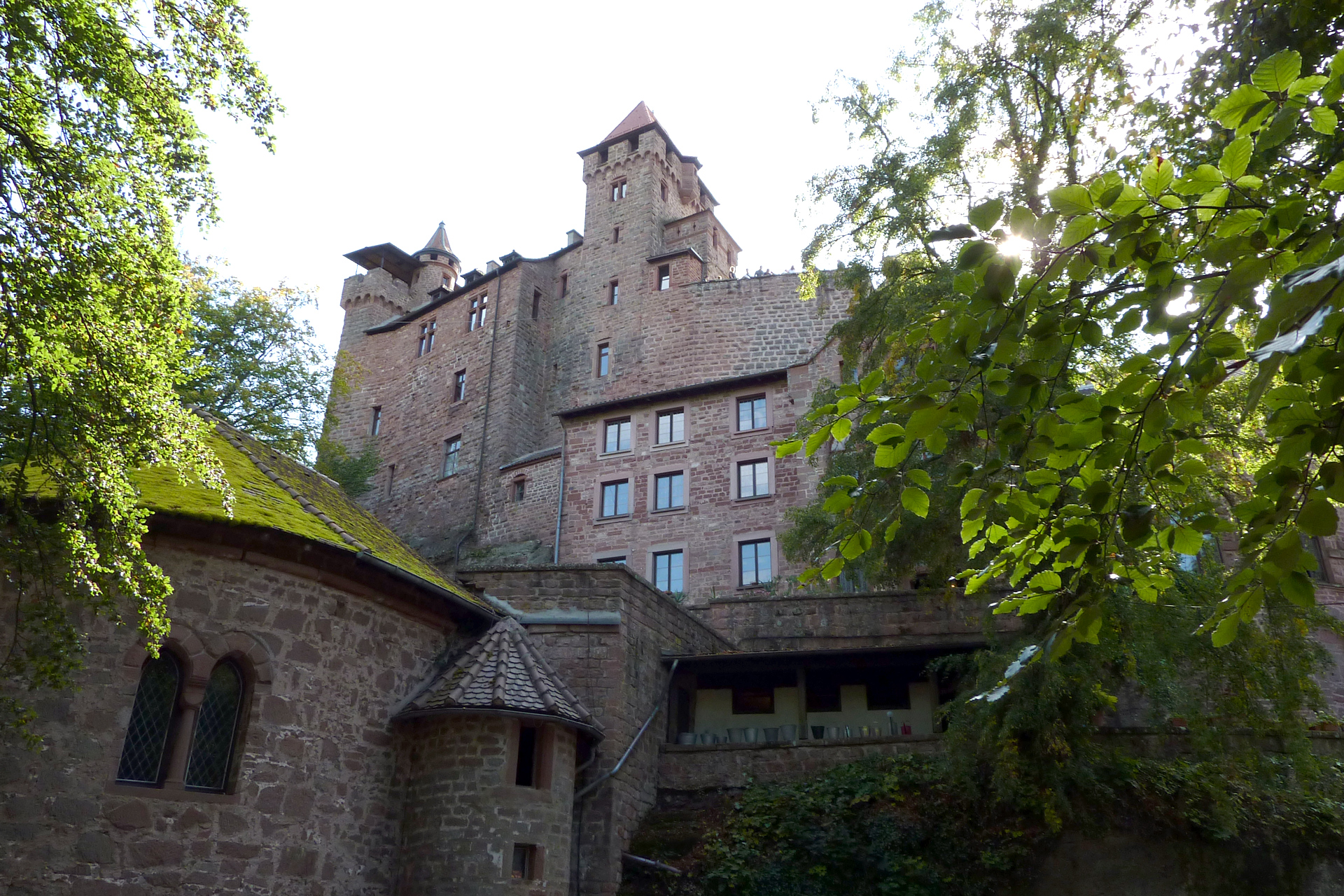
Berwartstein

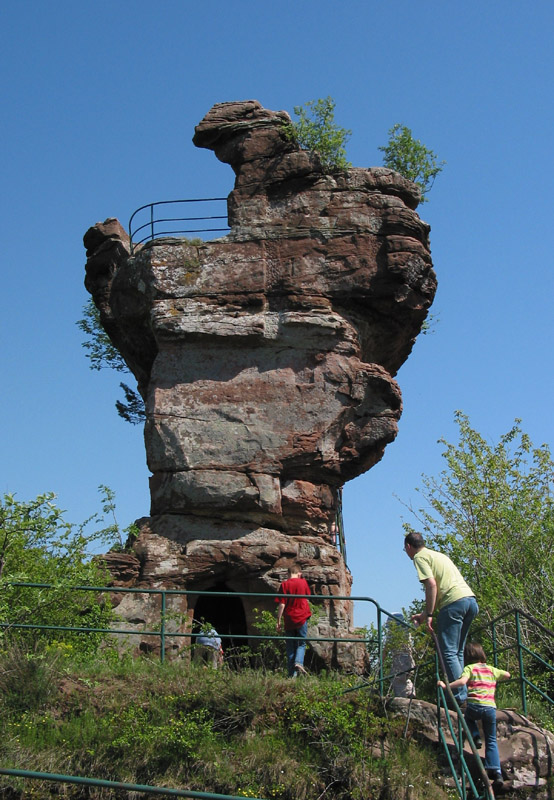
Drachenfels

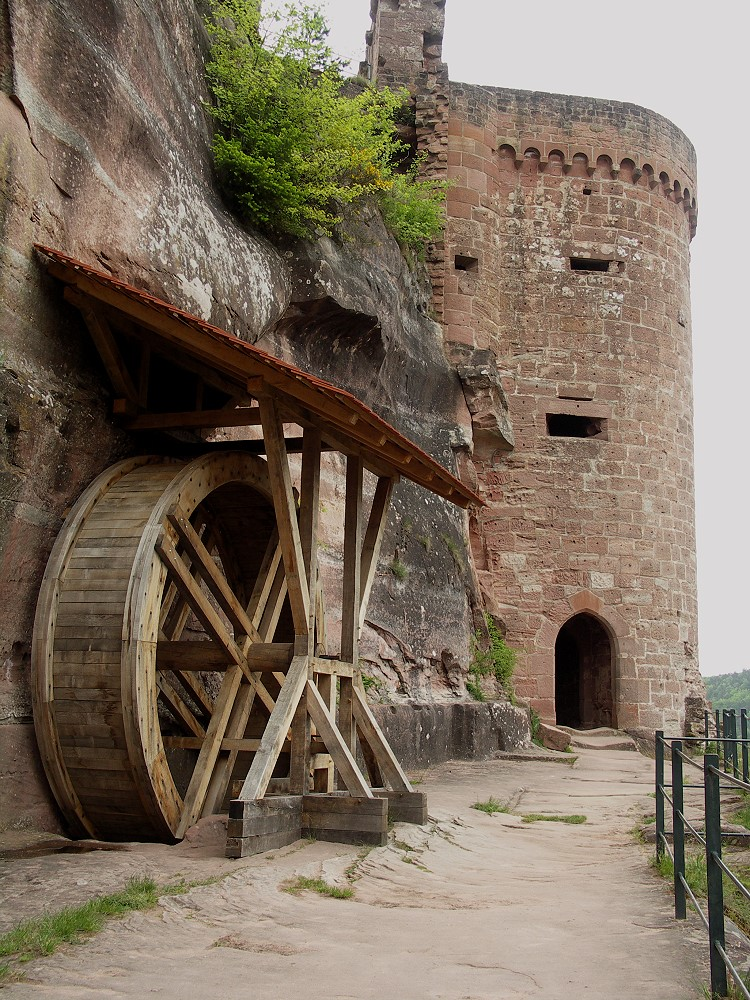
Altdahn

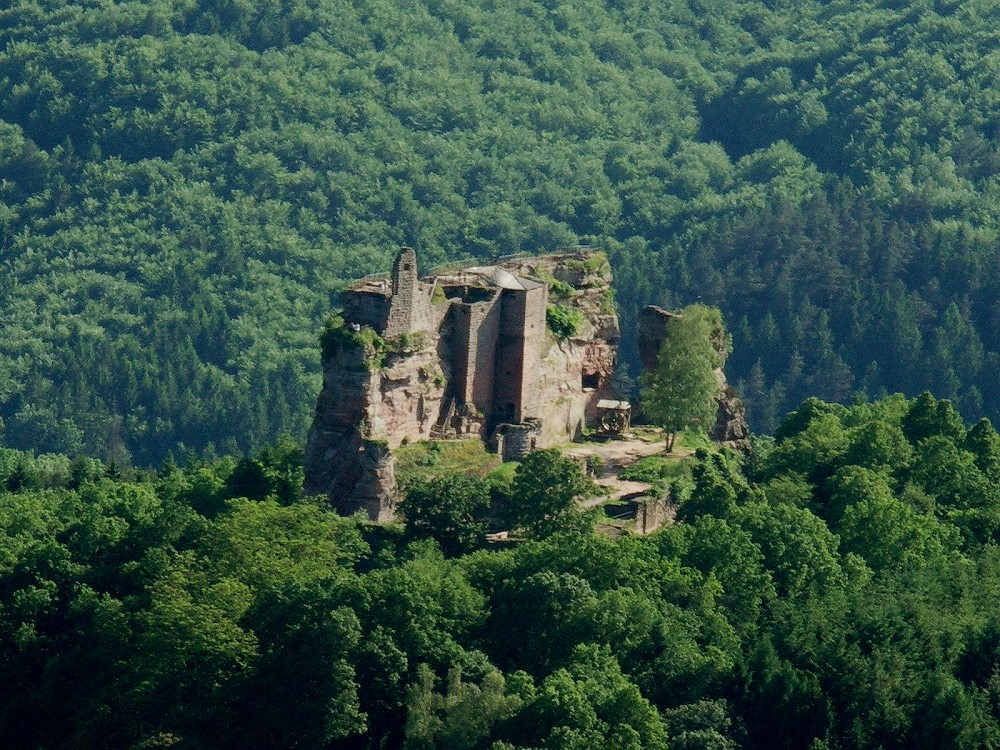
View of the Fleckenstein from the Hohenbourg

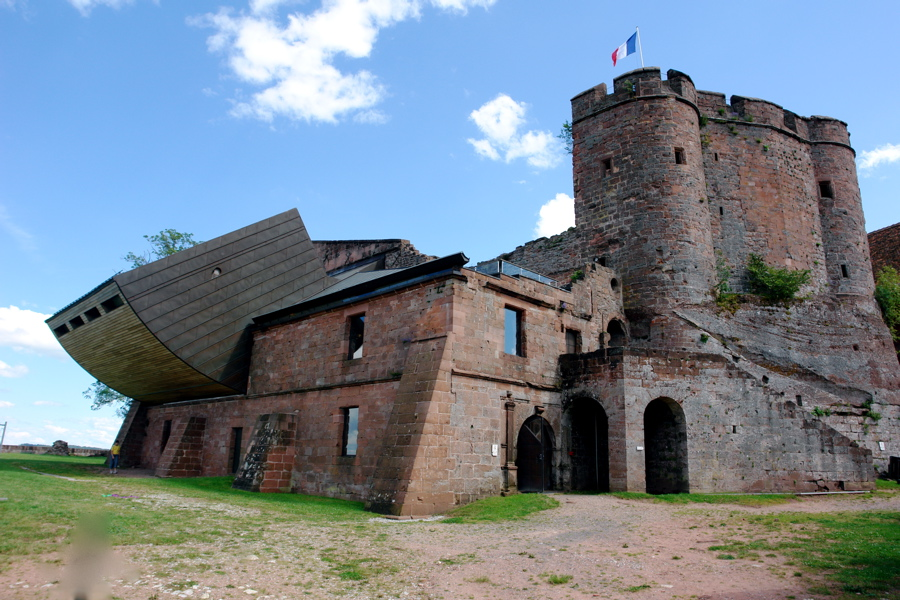
Lichtenberg

Of the numerous castles in the region, several have written history. Trifels Castle, which was partially restored during the 20th century, was where the imperial regalia were kept for a time during the Middle Ages. Together with the castles of Anebos and Scharfenberg, Trifels is the symbol of Annweiler. Berwartstein Castle owned by the legendary knight, Hans von Trotha, called "Hans Trapp", has been restored, is occupied and managed. Drachenfels Castle was destroyed because part of it had belonged to the rebellious knight, Franz von Sickingen. Other castles of the region include (from north to south):

- Lemberg
- Neudahn
- Madenburg
- Castles of Dahn, consisting of Altdahn, Grafendahn and Tanstein
- Landeck
- Lindelbrunn
- Wegelnburg, Hohenbourg and Lœwenstein
- Fleckenstein
- Blumenstein
- Wasigenstein
- Falkenstein
- Wasenbourg
- Lichtenberg
- Hunebourg

=== Rock formations ===
==== Shapes ====
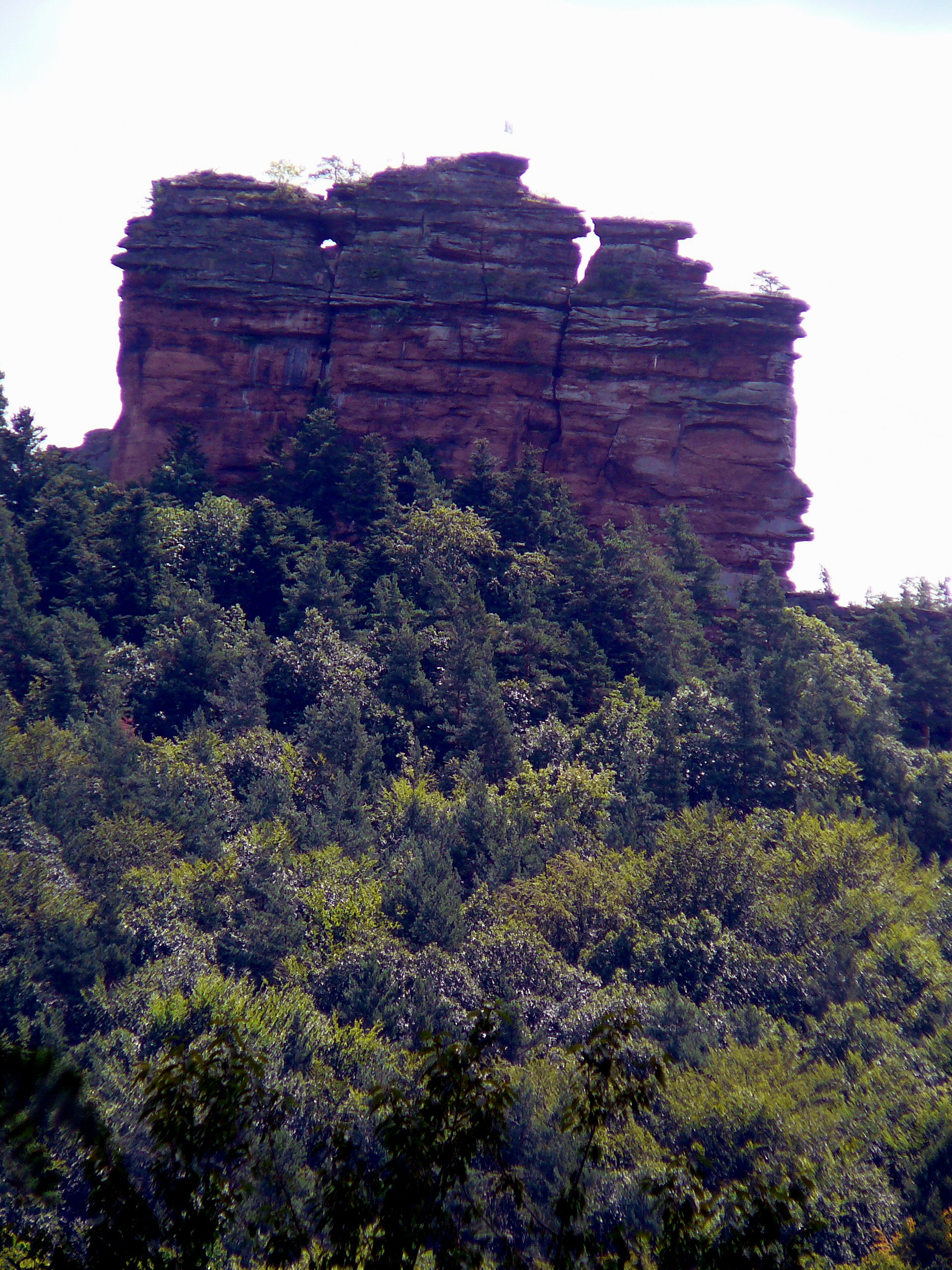
The Asselstein: view from northwest of its broader side

The Wasgau Felsenland ("rock country") is rich in bizarre sandstone rock formations, which have been formed over the millennia by the weathering and erosion of strata of differing hardness belonging to the Lower and Middle Bunter (see Geology section). In the Palatine part of the Wasgau alone there are over 200 rock massifs and free-standing rock pinnacles. Depending on the erosion of the Trifels, Rehberg and Karlstal beds they are classified as rock terraces (Felsriffe, e. g. the Heidenpfeiler and Buhlsteinpfeiler near Busenberg; the Lämmerfelsen rocks near Dahn), rock faces (Felswände, e.g. the Asselstein near Annweiler; the Erbsenfelsen near Egelshardt) and rock walls (Felsmauern, e. g. the Dimberg near Dimbach). Other rock forms are pinnacles (Felstürme, e. g. the Hundsfelsen near Waldrohrbach; the Hühnerstein near Hauenstein) and blocks (Felsklötze, e. g. Lindelbrunn near Vorderweidenthal; Fleckenstein near Hirschthal and Lembach), which are mainly found on top of conical hills.

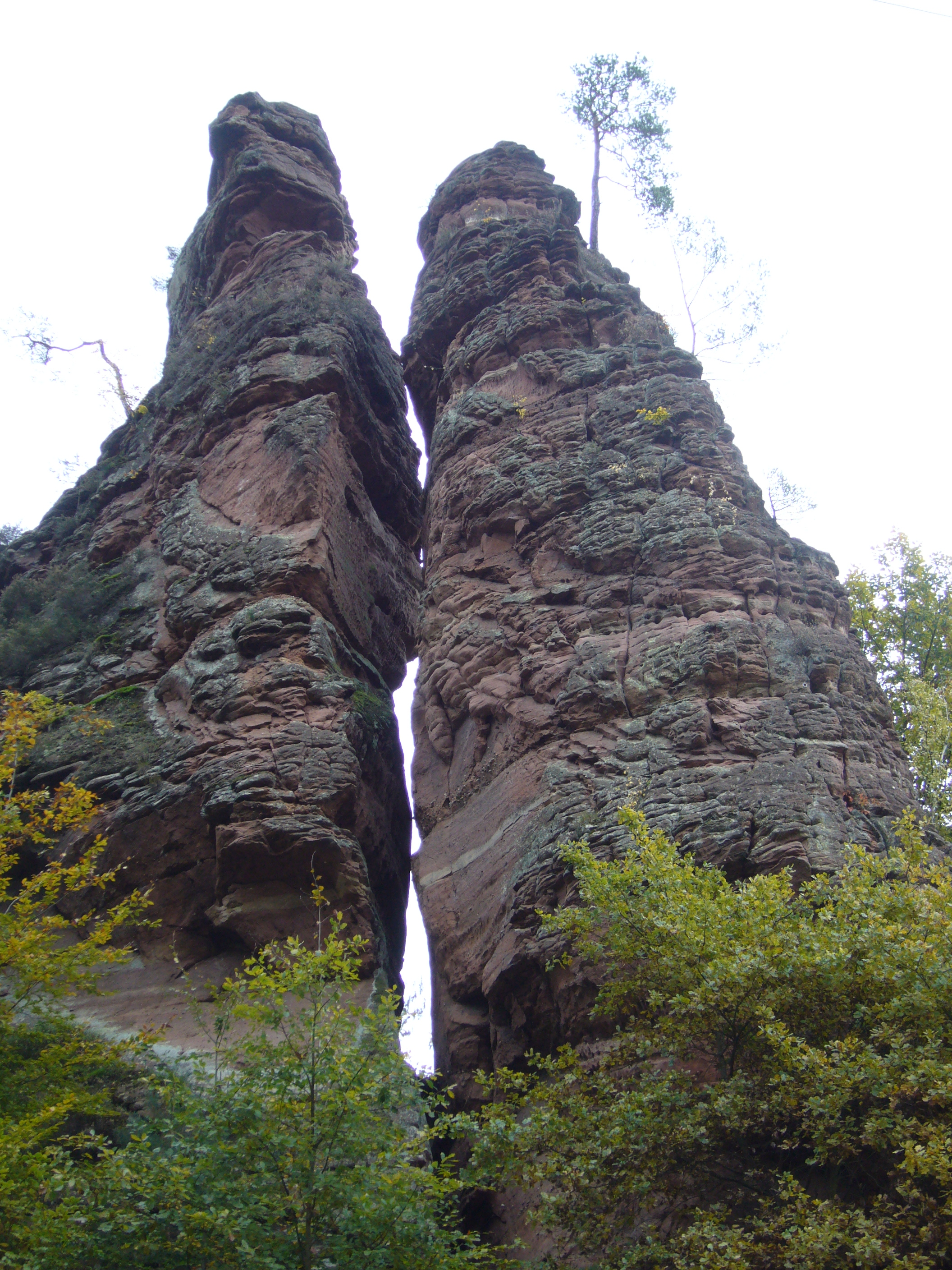
The Bride and Bridegroom

Small scale weathering of narrow strata with varying hardness has produced rock openings, rock gateways (Torfelsen, e.g. the Eilöchelfelsen near Busenberg), rock columns (Felsspalten, e.g. the Bride and Groom near Dahn) and rock tables (Tischfelsen, e.g. the Devil's Table). On many rocks - for example, the almost two-kilometre-long rock terrace of the Altschlossfelsen near Eppenbrunn – cornice-like overhangs and honeycomb weathering may also be seen.

Many castles in the Wasgau were built on rock terraces or blocks of rock; especially prominent examples are the "castle trinity" of Trifels, Anebos and Scharfenberg near Annweiler and Lindelbrunn Castle, a few kilometres to the southwest. Well known rock castles also include the Berwartstein near Erlenbach, the Drachenfels near Busenberg and the Fleckenstein near Hirschthal and Lembach (see Castles section).

==== Fauna und Flora ====
From a botanical perspective many rock regions form biotopes with particularly hardy and undemanding sandstone vegetation, that is mainly composed of mountain pine, common heather and simple grasses (e. g. wavy hair-grass), and, in wet areas, also mosses and ferns. In addition, since the 1980s, peregrine falcons have settled on a host of rocks, so that restrictions have had to be introduced for climbers, walkers and special users. In order to avoid conflicts of usage these regulations (out-of-bounds areas and the guarding of breeding rocks) are laid down annually by the Palatine Climbing Association and the Palatine Conservation Clubs (e. g. the Peregrine Conservation Working Group (Arbeitskreis Wanderfalkenschutz) of NABU).

==== Sports climbers and walkers ====
The Wasgauer Felsenland offers sport climbers a variety of different options which, thanks to the highly variable nature and weathering of sandstone rock, offer a wide range of climbing grades. Well known climbing areas include the regions around Annweiler (e. g. the Asselstein), Lug (e. g. Luger Friedrich) and Hauenstein (e. g. Spirkelbacher Rauhfels), as well as the Dahn (e. g. Lämmerfelsen) and Erfweiler regions (e. g. Heegerturm), to which the well known Bärenbrunner Tal belongs (e. g. Pferchfeldfelsen).

In order to enable walkers to experience this rock landscape at closer hand, in recent years a range of themed walks has been established. In the Wasgau these include the Dahn Rock Path (Dahner Felsenpfad), the Busenberg Clog Path (Busenberger Holzschuhpfad) the Hauenstein Cobbler Path (Hauensteiner Schusterpfad) and the Annweiler Red Sandstone Path (Annweilerer Buntsandsteinpfad). Whilst most rocks remain the province of professional climbers, certain rock terraces may be accessed on foot (e. g. the Buhlsteine, Heidenpfeiler and Rötzenstein) or may be climbed, with care, with the aid of ladders and steps (e. g. Hühnerstein near Hauenstein).

=== Gallery ===
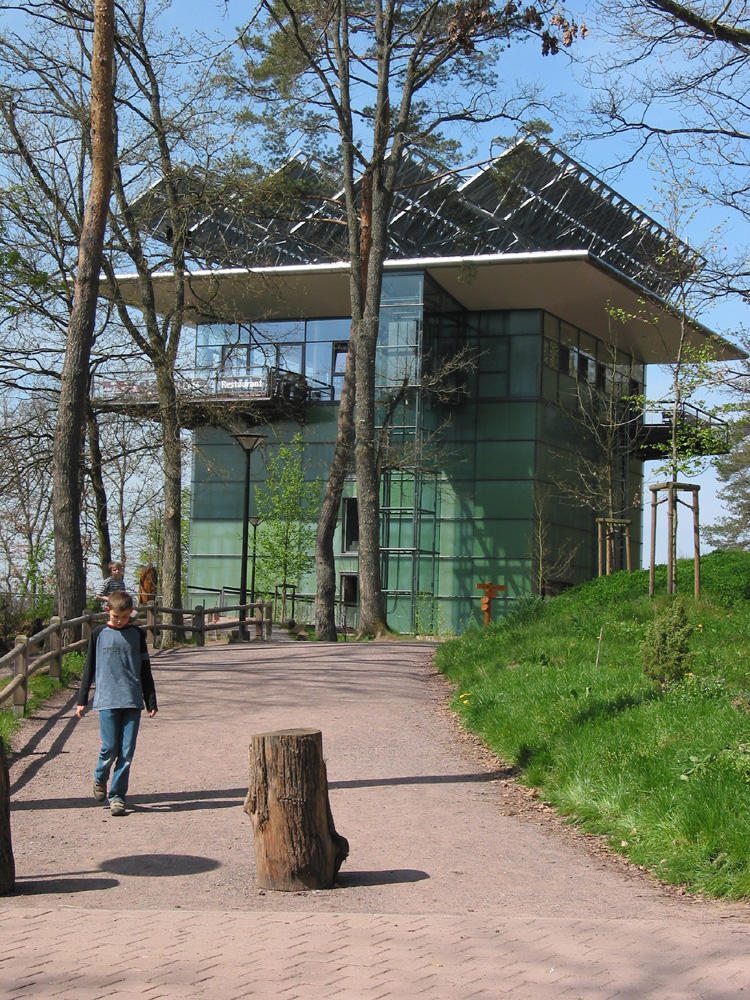
Biosphere House

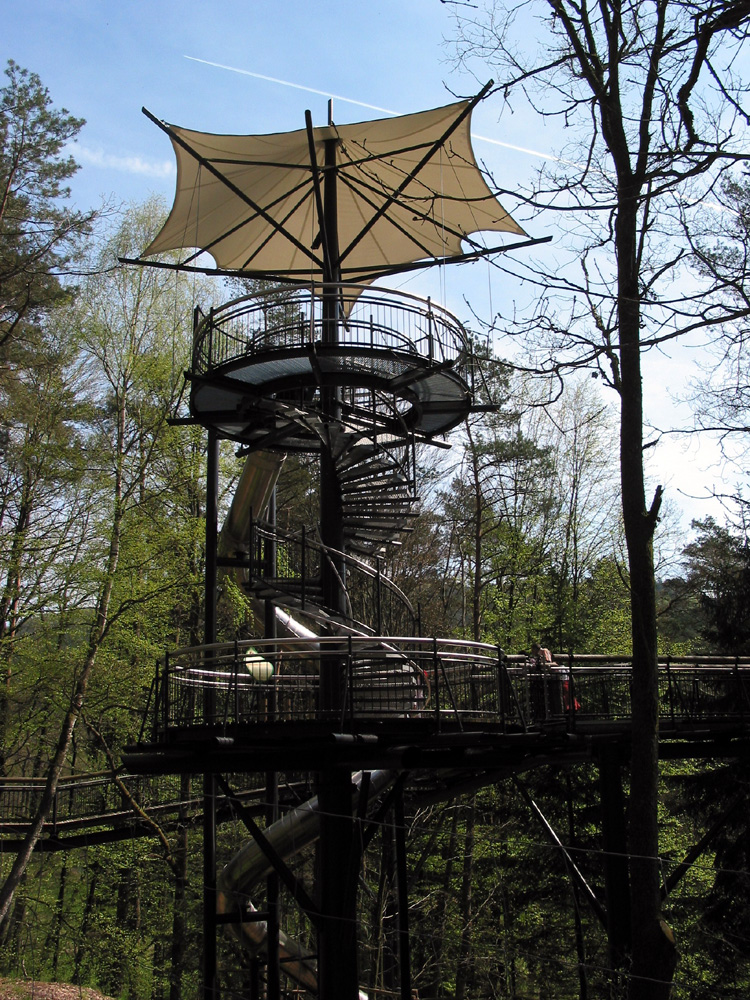
Baumwipfel Path

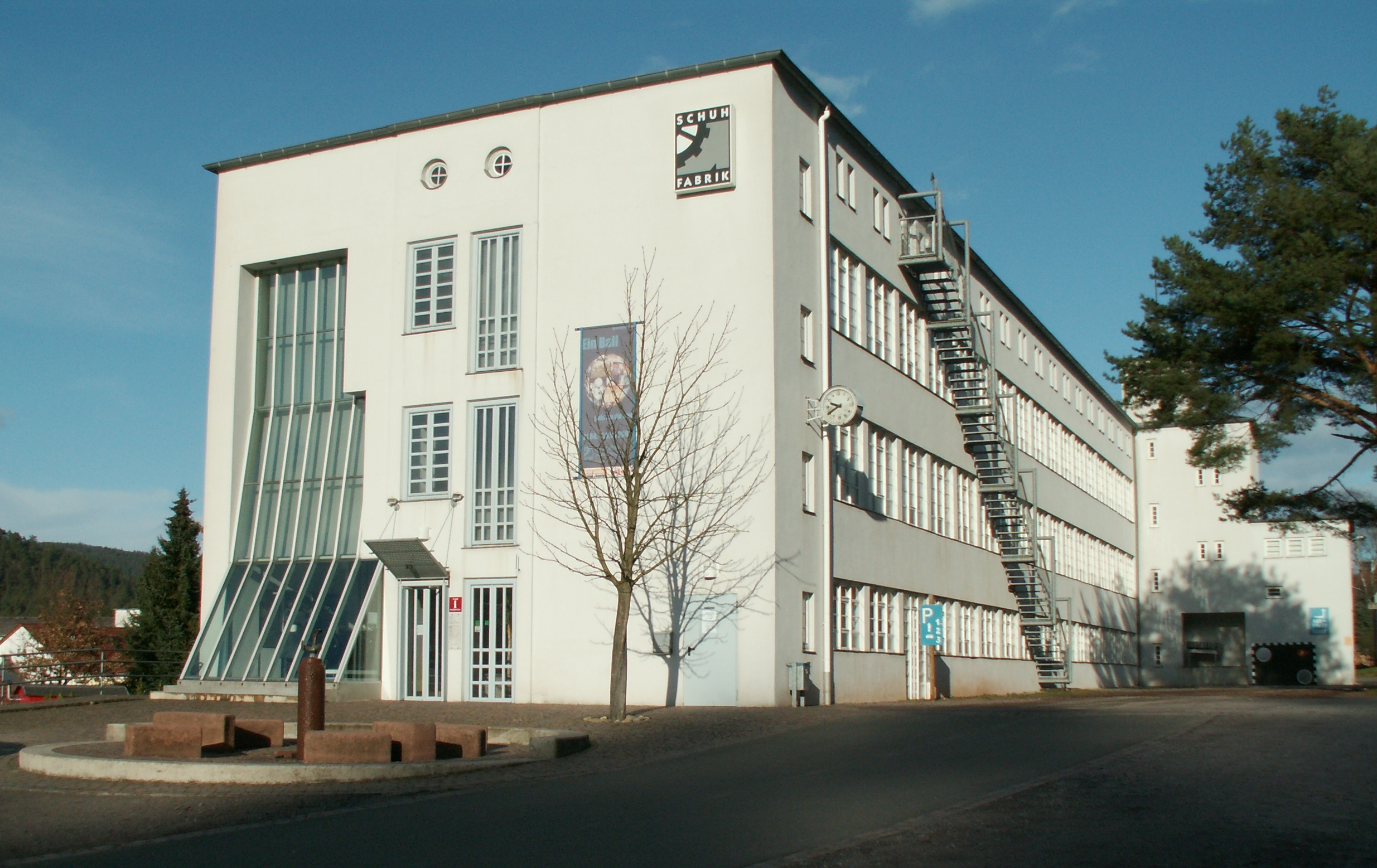
German Shoe Museum

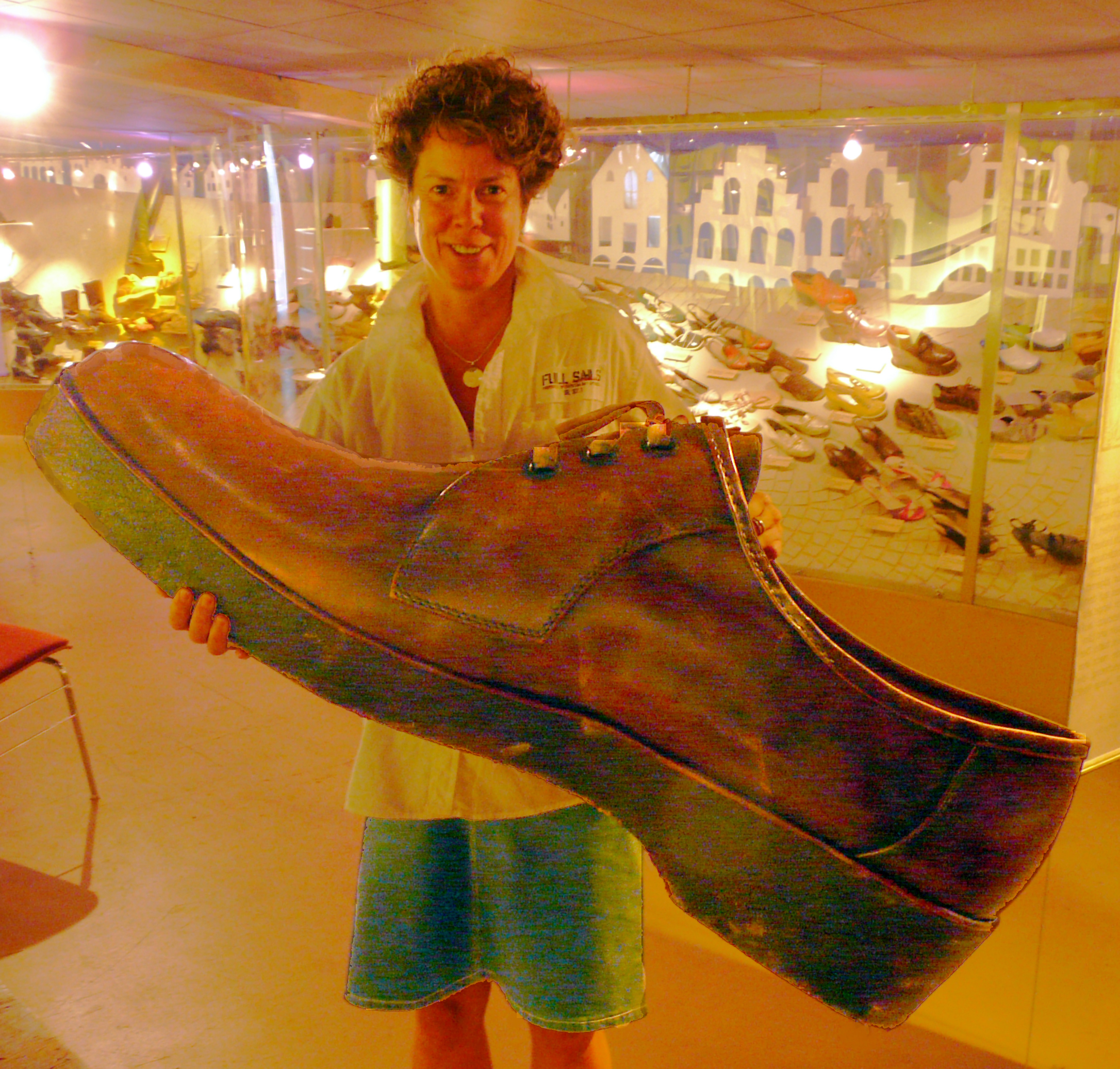
Shoe Museum: shoe size 180

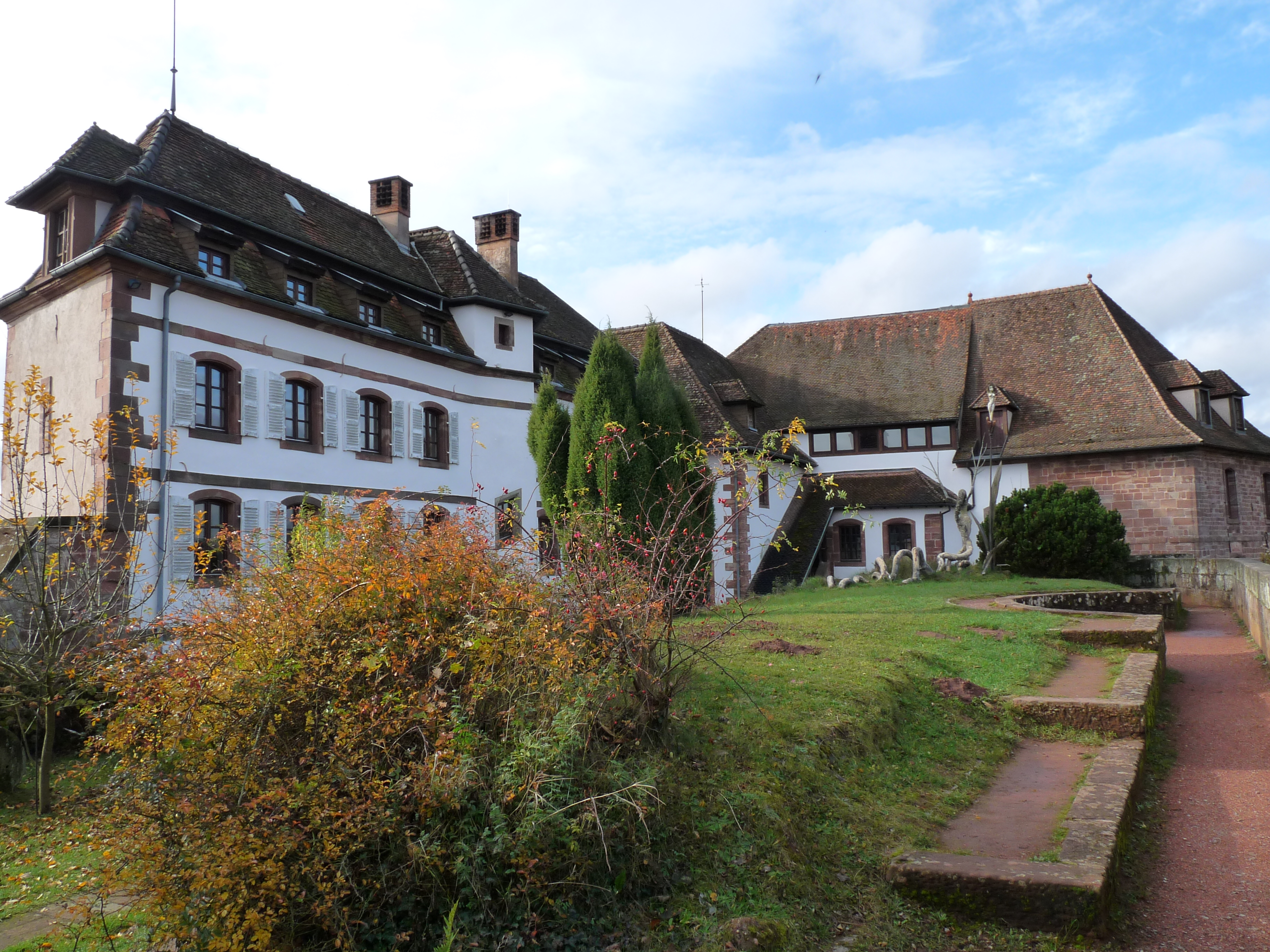
Administration centre of the North Vosges Nature Park

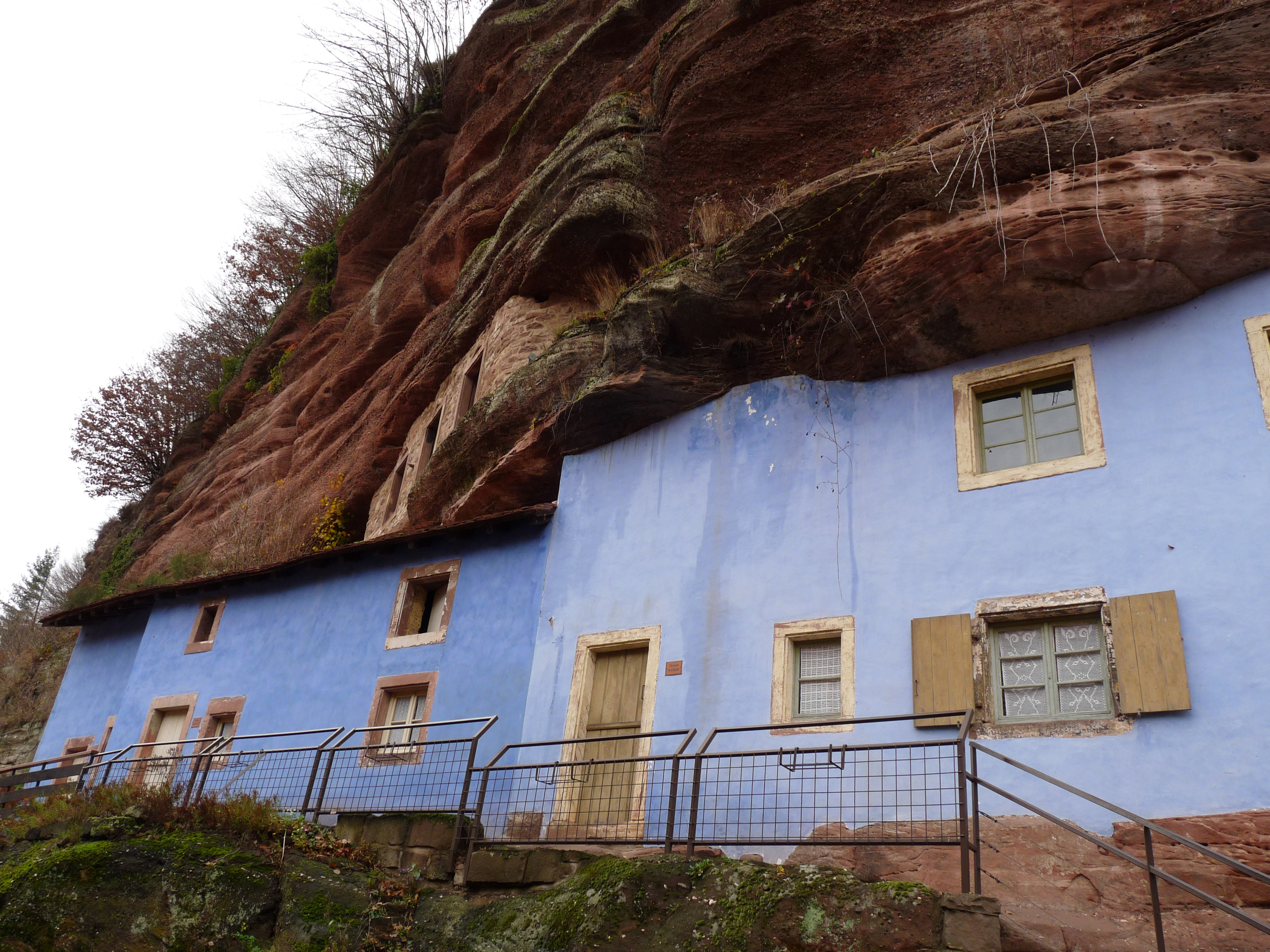
Rock homes in Graufthal

Amongst the other attractions of the Wasgau are the Biosphere House with its adjacent tree walk in Fischbach, the Südliche Weinstraße Wildlife Park in Silz, the German Shoe Museum, the Glass Shoe Factory in Hauenstein and the administrative centre of the North Vosges Nature Park in La Petite-Pierre (German: Lützelstein), which has an exhibition of the Palatine Forest-North Vosges Biosphere Reserve. Also in La Petite-Pierre is the Alsace Seal Museum (Musée du sceau alsacien) and a local history museum (Musée des Arts et Traditions populaires).

Another attraction are the rock dwellings a few kilometres south of La Petite-Pierre in Graufthal; in three houses that are built into the rock face, up to 37 people have lived over the centuries. After the death of their last inhabitant in 1958 the rock dwellings were preserved as a cultural monument and may be viewed today as an open-air museum.

== Economy and infrastructure ==
=== Settlement ===
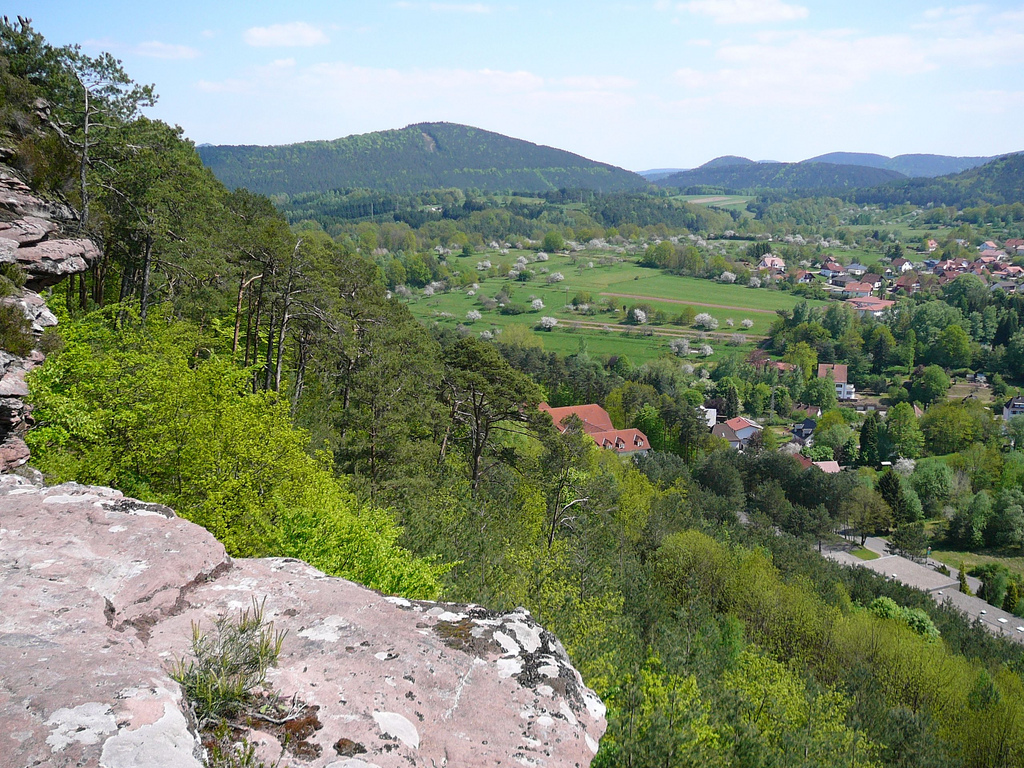
Typical settlement structure in the Wasgau: view looking east from the Nedingfelsen rocks over parts of Hauenstein

About 237,000 inhabitants live in the Palatine Forest-North Vosges Biosphere Reserve, spread over 215 municipalities. With a total area of 3,105 km^{2} this gives a population density of slightly more than 76 inhabitants per km^{2}. On the German side, the density is higher, with an average of 89 inhabitants per km^{2}, but, on the French side, it drops to just 59 inhabitants per km^{2}. The biosphere reserve includes not only the actual forest-covered mountains, but also densely populated areas along the edge of the Rhine Graben and the Westrich Plateau. If these areas are excluded to leave the area of the actual natural region itself, the population density is only about 20-30 inhabitants per km^{2} (e.g. 24 inhabitants per km^{2} in Phillipsbourg in Canton de Bitche) which, for Central Europe, are extremely low values. For example, the population density for the whole of Germany is 229 persons per km^{2}. Similarly, the number of settlements is lower in the natural region; the German part of the Wasgau has only about 50 and the French part, about 40, i.e. a total of about 90 communities. These relatively small settlements only occupy 5% of the total area, and are surrounded by vast, desolate forests (some 70-90 % of the total land area), and lie mainly in the valleys and on the plateaux of the low mountain range. Exceptions are upland villages such as Climbach in the eastern Hochwald, Lemberg in the Palatinate and in Lorraine, and, in the southwest, the tourist destination of La Petite-Pierre; the latter settlements being in the high, plateau-like, transition region between the red sandstone landscape of the Wasgau and the limestone formations of the Westrich Plateau.

Other, larger settlements on the German side are Annweiler am Trifels, Dahn and Hauenstein. On the French, in addition to the aforementioned places, are the villages of Lembach, Obersteinbach, Niedersteinbach and Wingen-sur-Moder. The eastern edge of the range includes the settlements of Albersweiler and Bad Bergzabern in the Palatinate, and Wissembourg, Niederbronn-les-Bains, Ingwiller and Saverne in Alsace. In the southwest to northwest running strip on the edge of the Wasgau lie the settlements of Phalsbourg and Bitche in Lorraine, and Eppenbrunn and Pirmasens in the Palatinate, the last-named being the largest town on the edge of the Wasgau.

=== Economy ===
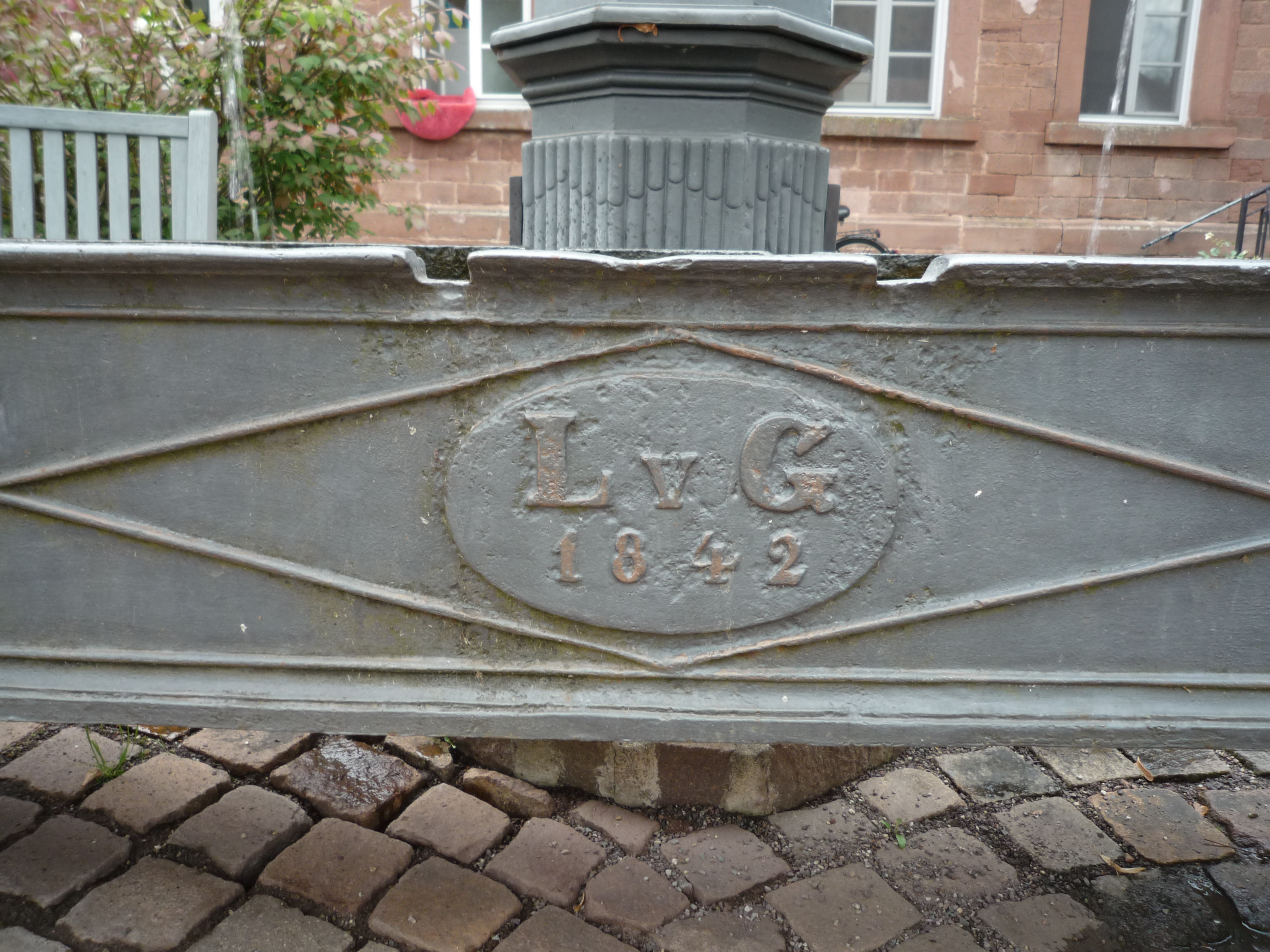
Inscription on the Gienanth Fountain in Schönau

Iron production and processing, which was important in earlier times (for example, iron smelting in Schönau) came to an end in the late 19th century. A number of so-called Gienanth fountains bear witness to this traditional industry today.

In the 19th and 20th centuries, forestry-related industry and small businesses dominated, especially those involved in shoe manufacturing.

After the Second World War, the shoe industry waned and the economy increasingly turned to tourism, which has now become the main source of income. In addition to mere relaxation, active holidays are offered, for example, climbing in the South Palatinate Climbing Area or hiking. There are several well-maintained cycle paths that mainly follow the valleys in the Wasgau.

=== Transport ===
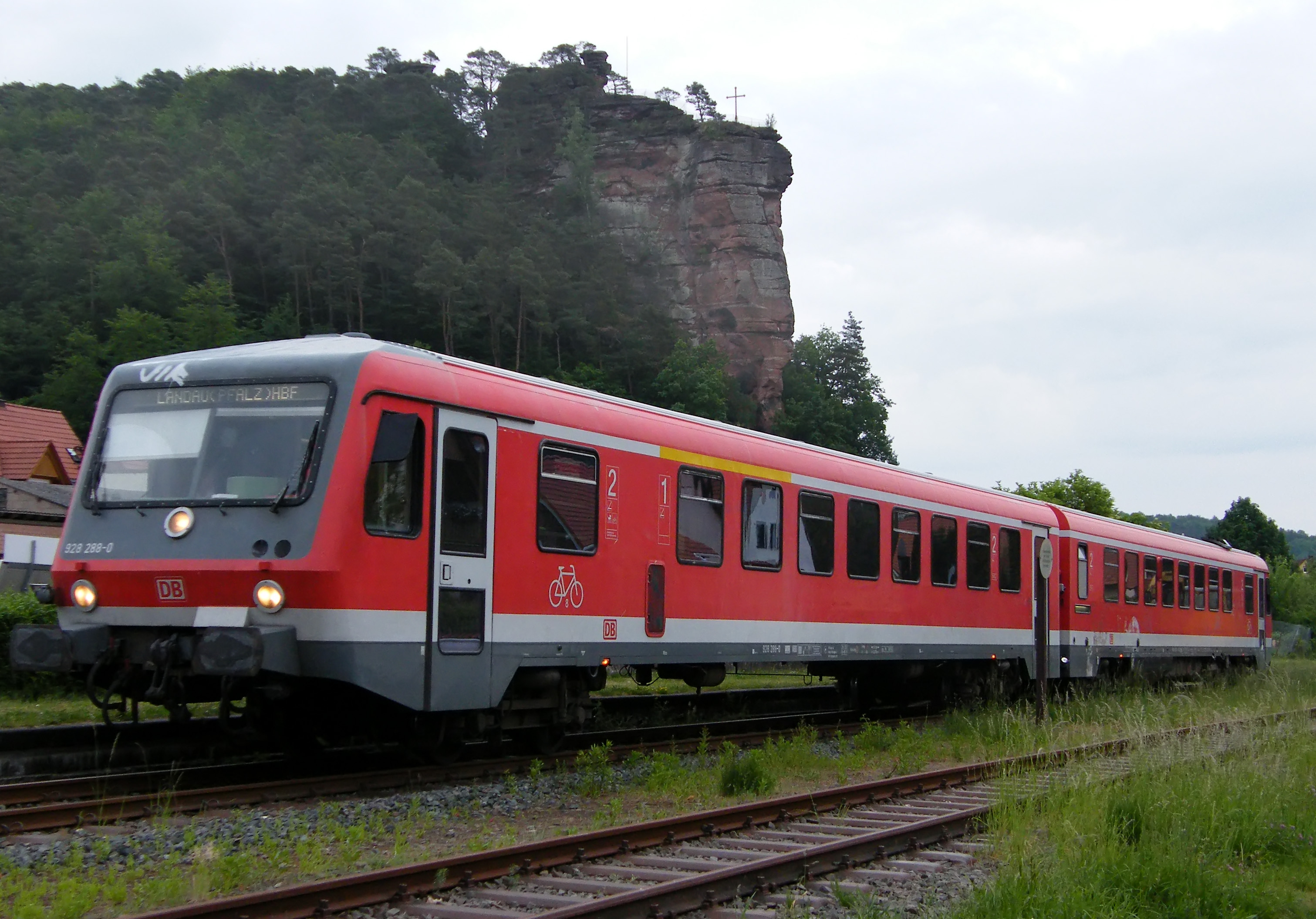
Regionalbahn train to Landau at Dahn station (2008)

In addition to the main transport artery of the B 10 federal highway along the northern edge of the Wasgau, the region is accessible on the Palatine side in the east from the B 48, from Annweiler to Bad Bergzabern, and in the west and south via the B 427, from Hinterweidenthal via Dahn to Bad Bergzabern. On the other side of the border, the well-developed departement road, the D 662, along the western edge of the Wasgau, links Bitche with Niederbronn-le-Bain and Haguenau in the Rhine plain. The A 4 motorway from Paris to Strasbourg and the D 604 cross the Col de Saverne, right in the south of the natural region.

The railway line from Pirmasens to Landau, the Queich Valley Railway which runs parallel to the B 10, was once part of the trunk route between Saarbrücken and Munich, but has been repeatedly downgraded in importance. On the Wieslauter Railway in the west there are excursion services on Sundays and holidays. The line from Saarbrücken via Sarreguemines through the valley of the Moder to Strasbourg mainly serves regional traffic. Currently under construction is the TGV link between Paris and Strasbourg, which will cross under the Col de Saverne through a tunnel.

== See also ==
- Südliche Weinstraße Wildlife Park

== Literature ==
- August Becker (2005) [1st edn. 1857], Die Pfalz und die Pfälzer (in German) (7th ed.), Landau/Pfalz: Pfälzische Verlagsanstalt, pp. 200–337, ISBN 3898571939
- Rüdiger Bernges (2005), Felsenburgen im Wasgau (in German) (4th ed.), Meckenheim: Warlich Verlag, ISBN 3930376253
- Michael Geiger (1987), "Der Pfälzerwald im geographischen Überblick", in Michael Geiger; et al. (eds.), Der Pfälzerwald : Porträt einer Landschaft (in German), Landau/Pfalz: Verlag Pfälzische Landeskunde, ISBN 3980114716
- Michael Geiger (2010), "Die Landschaften der Pfalz", in Michael Geiger (ed.), Geographie der Pfalz (in German), Landau/Pfalz: Verlag Pfälzische Landeskunde, pp. 92–113, ISBN 9783981297409
- Daniel Häberle (1913), Der Pfälzerwald : Ein Beitrag zur Landeskunde der Rheinpfalz (in German), Braunschweig und Berlin: Georg Westermann Verlag, pp. 10–32
- Karl Heinz (1976), Pfalz mit Weinstraße : Landschaft, Geschichte, Kultur, Kunst, Volkstum (in German), Heroldsberg: Glock und Lutz Verlag, pp. 191–238, ASIN B01KOIENVO
- Emil Heuser (1979) [1st edn. 1900], Neuer Pfalzführer (in German) (14th ed.), Ludwigshafen/Rhein: Waldkirch Verlag, ASIN B0043G3V6M
- Emil Knöringer (1985), Der Wasgau mit seinen Felsen und Felsenburgen (in German) (2nd ed.), Landau/Pfalz: Verlag Pfälzer Kunst Dr. Hans Blinn, ISBN 3922580165
- Kurt Reh (1981), Michael Geiger; et al. (eds.), "Der Pfälzerwald : Eine Einführung in Landschaft und Namengebung", Pfälzische Landeskunde (in German), vol. 1, Landau/Pfalz: Selbstverlag, p. 381, ASIN B0025WB9GK
- Martina Schönberger (2005), Landesamt für Geologie und Bergbau Rheinland-Pfalz (ed.), Geologie und Erdgeschichte von Rheinland-Pfalz (in German), Stuttgart: Schweizerbart’sche Verlagsbuchhandlung, ISBN 3510652657
- Heinz Wittner (1981), Großer Pfalzführer (in German), Stuttgart: Deutscher Wanderverlag Dr. Mair & Schnabel, pp. 176–226, ISBN 3813401065
