= Grafendahn Castle =

Castle in Germany

- Burg Grafendahn
- Dahn
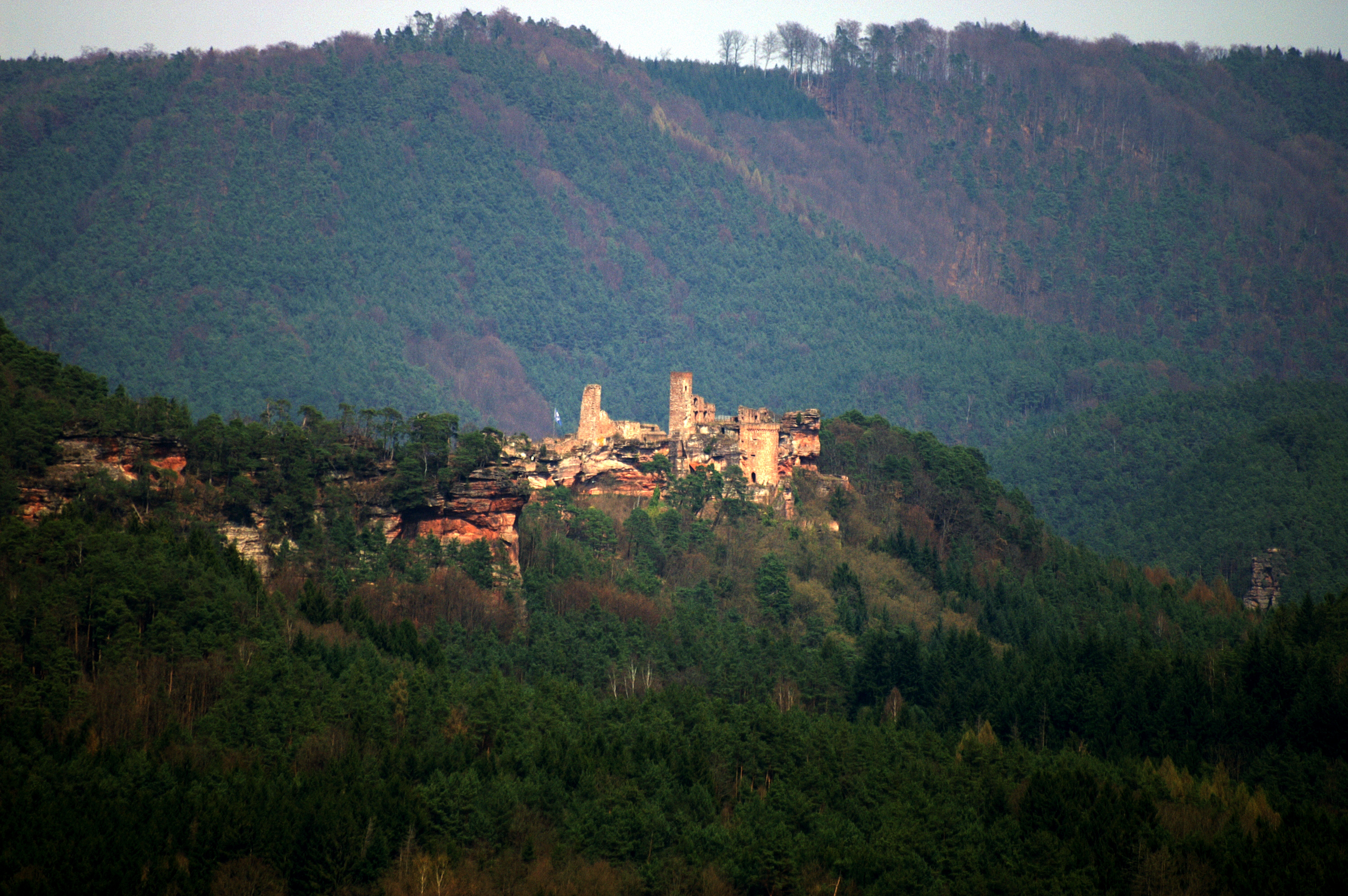
- The castles of Dahn

Site information
- Type: rock castle
- Code: DE-RP
- Condition: ruin

Location
- Coordinates: 49°09′01″N 7°48′08″E

Site history
- Built: 1287
- Materials: rusticated ashlar

Burg Grafendahn - Dahn - 01.jpg

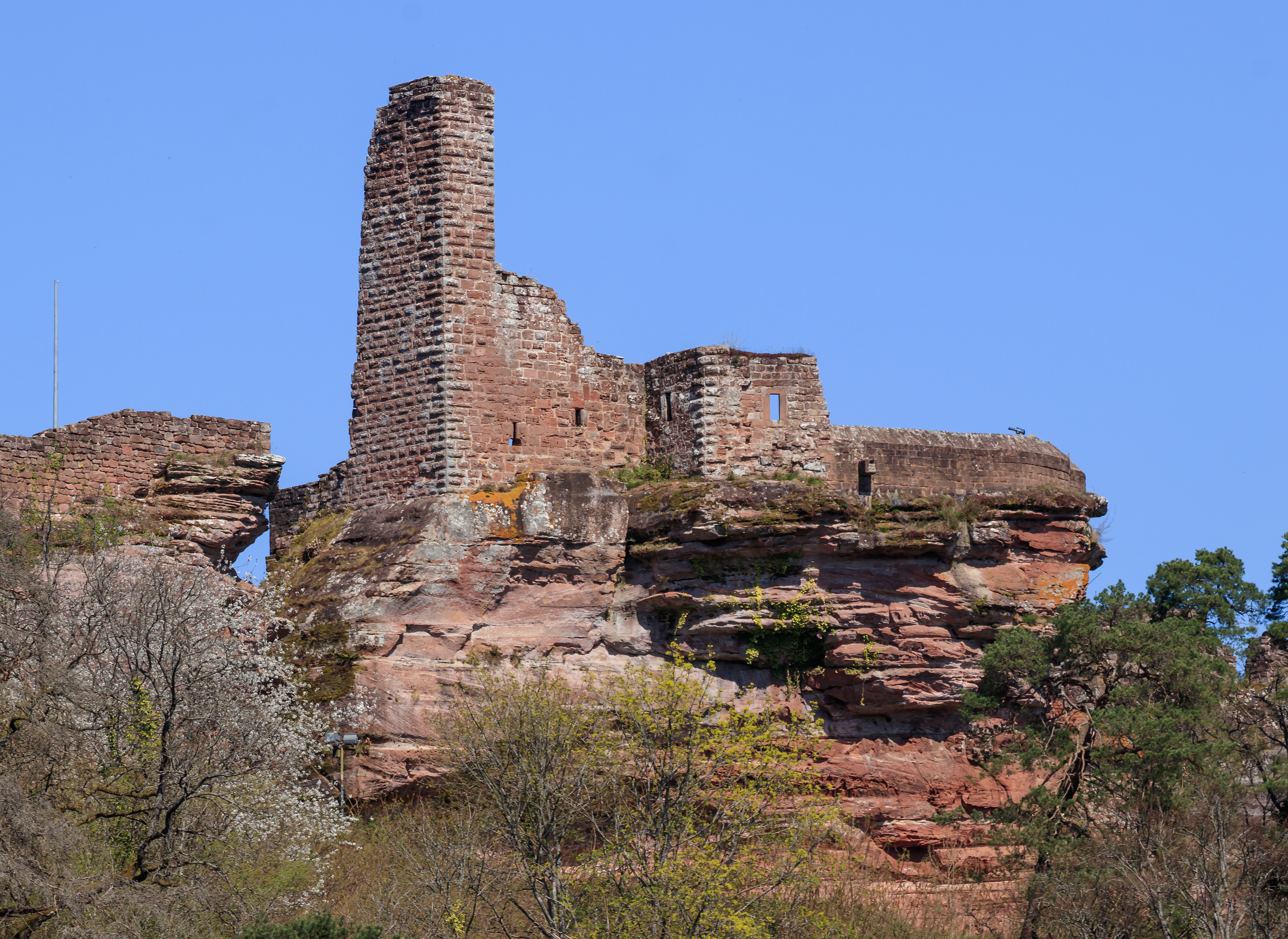
View from south

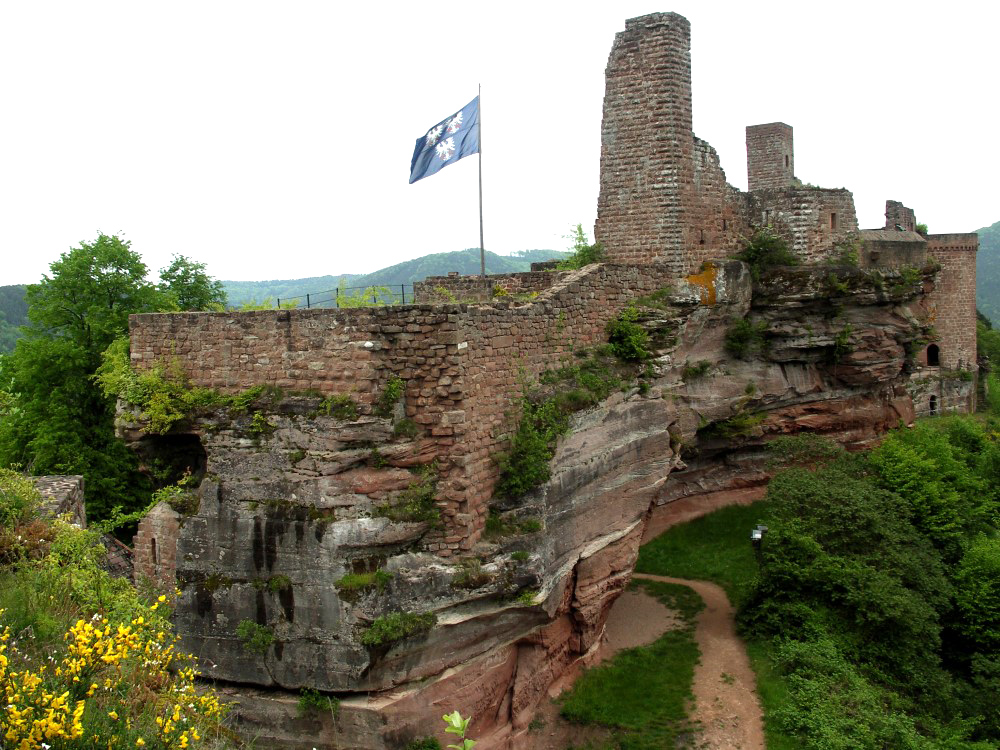
View from Tanstein over Grafendahn to Altdahn

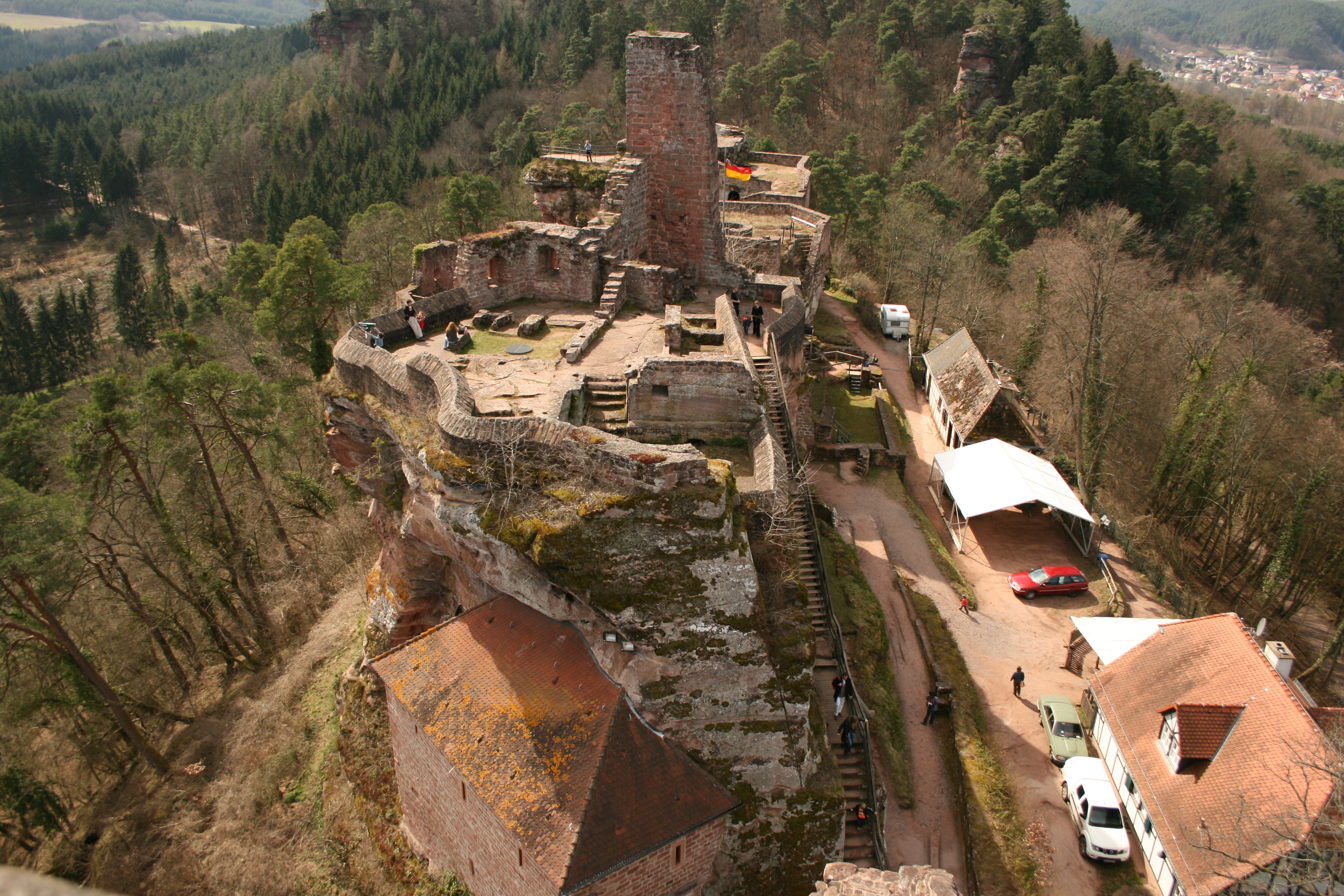
View in the opposite direction: from the tower of Altdahn Castle of Grafendahn (foreground) and Tanstein (behind).

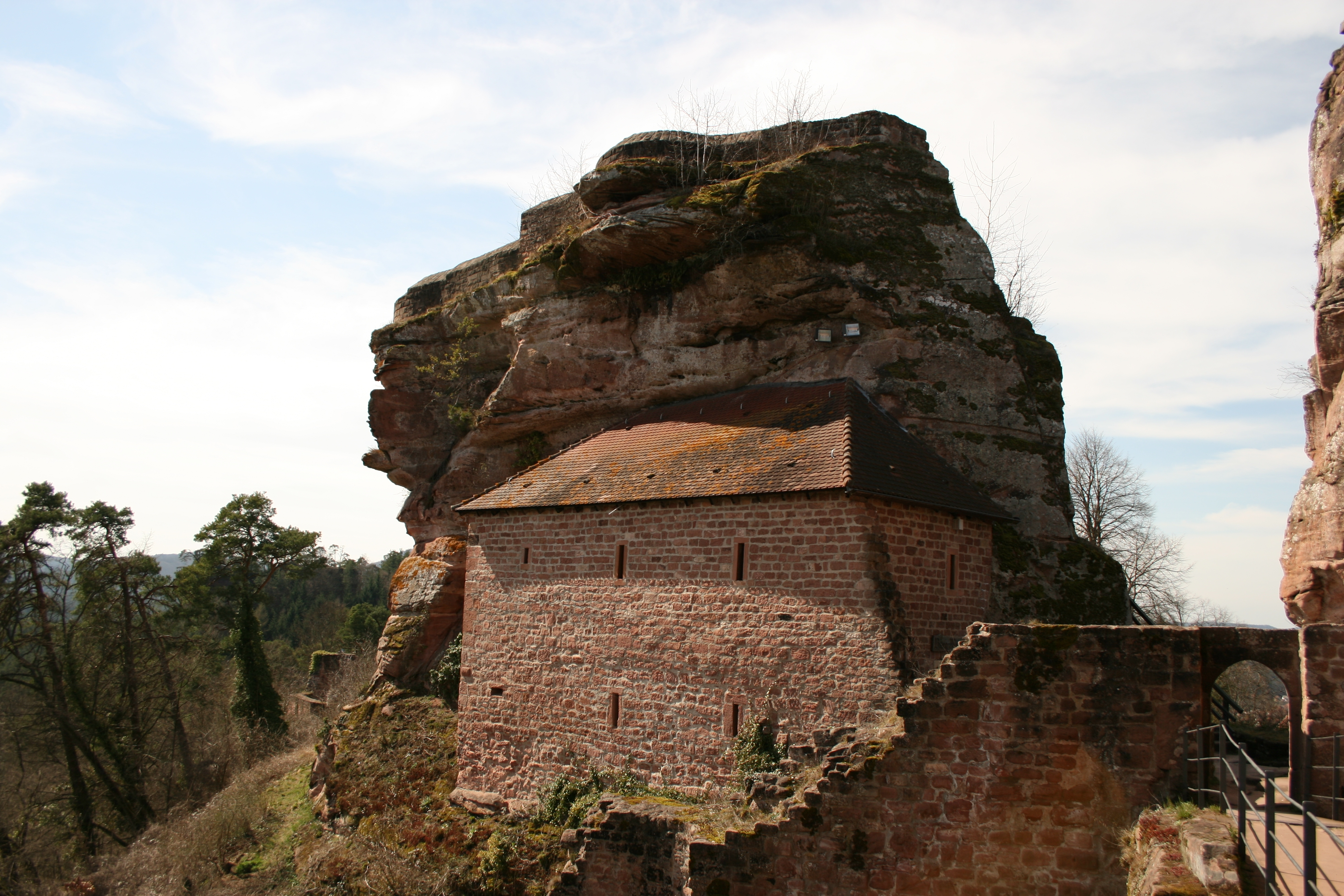
Castle rocks of Grafendahn from the east. Foreground: the castle museum.

Grafendahn Castle (German: Burg Grafendahn) lies in the southern Palatine Forest, the German part of the Wasgau region, just under 1 kilometre east of the small town of Dahn in the state of Rhineland-Palatinate.

== Location ==
The rock castle of Grafendahn belongs to the group of castles at Dahn, which also includes Altdahn and Tanstein. Although the three castles are sited next to one another on a rocky ridge, they were not built at the same time. A similar type of castle arrangement is also found e. g. in the nearby French Vosges in the upper Alsace where there is a cluster of three castles at Husseren.

== History ==
Grafendahn was built in 1287 by Conrad of Mursel, who was a Lehnsmann or vassal of the bishops of Speyer and a nephew of Frederick of Dahn (see Altdahn). The castle was conceived from the outset as a so-called Ganerbenburg - a castle in which several families or family lines lived and worked at the same time. As early as 1288, there were five other heirs, besides Conrad Mursel, who included the counts of Sponheim. In 1339, Count John II of Sponheim purchased all parts of the site from the various parties concerned (including William of Winstein, Conrad Mursel's son-in-law) and thus became the sole owner.

In 1425, the castle defences were strengthened and, in 1437, when the House of Sponheim became extinct on the death of John V, it was transferred by inheritance treaty into the possession of the margraves of Baden. However its defences were not robust enough to withstand a siege by Prince Elector Frederick the Victorious; in 1462 he took the castle and had it slighted. It was clearly not rebuilt in a systematic way. In 1480 Hans von Trotha, who was already the liegeman of Berwartstein Castle, was also given Grafendahn as a fief by the prince elector, and took full ownership in 1485 through purchase. Nevertheless, around 1500, the castle was described as "uninhabitable".

Until 1637 the ruined castle belonged to the lords of Fleckenstein. In 1642 it changed hands again and was acquired by the tavern at Waldenburg, where it remained for about 150 years. In 1793 the site went back to the Bishopric of Speyer as Lehnsherr (liege lord), who did not enfeoff it again.

== Site ==
Grafendahn Castle is the smallest of the three Dahn castles and is located on the middle of the five castle rock outcrops. The development of the upper ward (the Oberburg) is rather unclear today due to its modern parapet walls. In the west of the upper ward are the striking ruins of a shield wall, that was erected facing Tanstein Castle. Parts of it have survived at its original height. It was built of rusticated ashlars. Against the shield wall there was a small palas as well as several domestic buildings.

In the lower ward (the Unterburg), which is situated on two narrow rock terraces, several chambers, cattle troughs and a well shaft have survived. The castle museum has been house in a restored stable block since 1987.

== Literature ==
- Stefan Grathoff: Die Dahner Burgen. Alt-Dahn – Grafendahn – Tanstein. Guidebook 21. Edition Burgen, Schlösser, Altertümer Rheinland Pfalz. Schnell und Steiner, Regensburg, 2003. ISBN 3-7954-1461-X.
- Walter Herrmann: Auf rotem Fels. Ein Führer zu den schönsten Burgen der Pfalz und des elsässischen Wasgau. DRW-Verl. Weinbrenner, Braun, Karlsruhe, 2004, ISBN 3-7650-8286-4.
- Peter Pohlit; Alexander Thon (2002), "Grafendahn", in Jürgen Keddigkeit; Alexander Thon; Rolf Übel (eds.), Pfälzisches Burgenlexikon. Vol. 2. F–H (in German), vol. Bd. 12.2, Kaiserslautern, pp. 213–223, ISBN 3-927754-48-X, ISSN 0936-7640
- Elena Rey: Burgenführer Pfalz. Superior, Kaiserslautern, 2003, ISBN 3-936216-15-0.
- Günter Stein: Burgen und Schlösser in der Pfalz. Ein Handbuch. Weidlich, Frankfurt, 1976, ISBN 3-8035-8356-X.
- Alexander Thon (ed.): ...wie eine gebannte, unnahbare Zauberburg. Burgen in der Südpfalz. 2., verb. Aufl. Schnell + Steiner, Regensburg, 2005, pp. 18–25, ISBN 3-7954-1570-5.

== See also ==
- Castles of Dahn
- Altdahn Castle
- Tanstein Castle
- Neudahn Castle
- List of castles in Rhineland-Palatinate
- Jungfernsprung
