= Altdahn Castle =

Castle in Germany

- Burg Altdahn
- Dahn
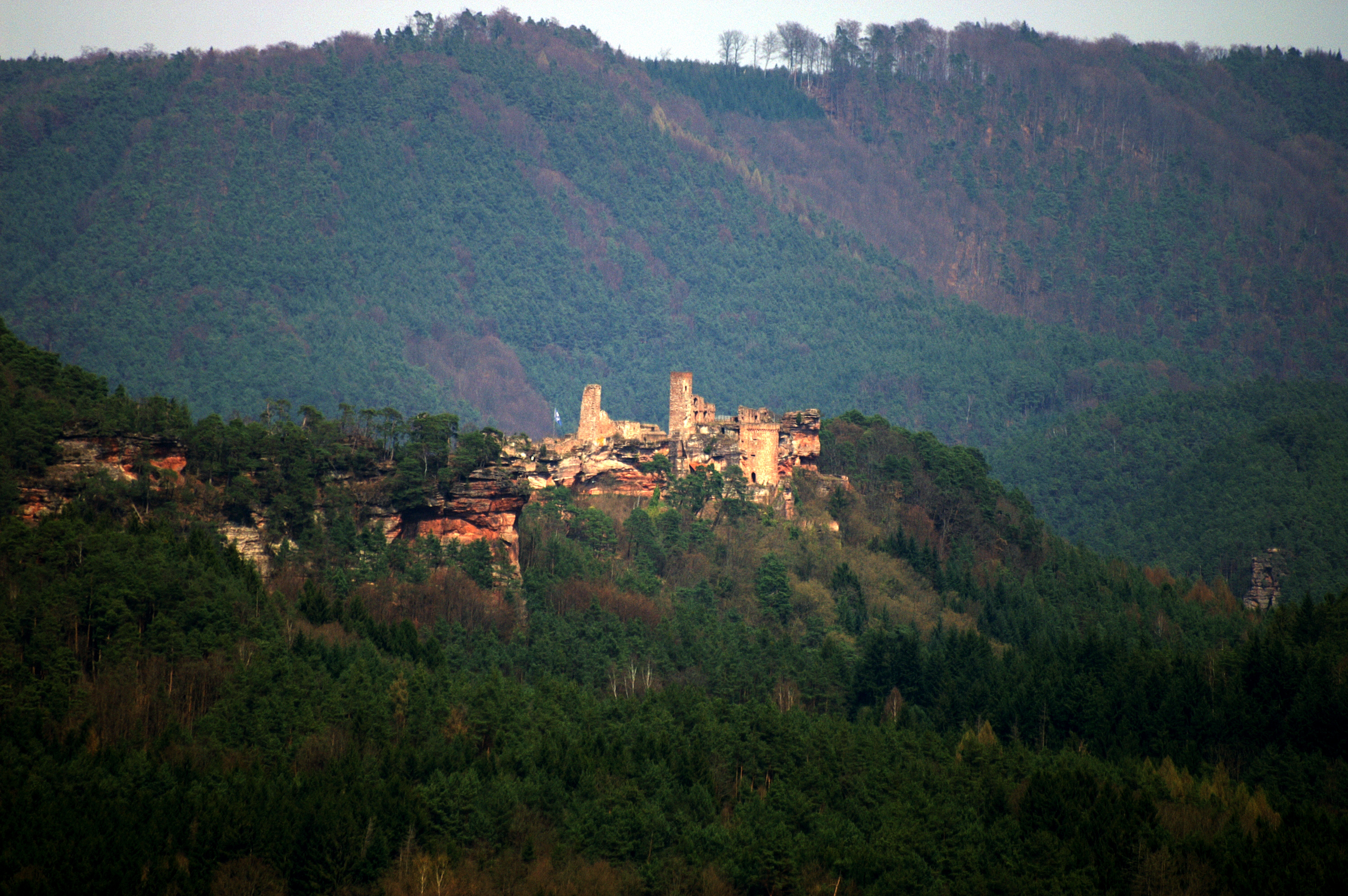
- The castle group at Dahn

Site information
- Type: hill castle, rock castle
- Code: DE-RP
- Condition: ruin

Location
- Coordinates: 49°09′00″N 7°48′05″E
- Height: 337 m above sea level (NN)

Site history
- Built: between 1200 and 1236
- Materials: rusticated ashlar

Garrison information
- Occupants: ministeriales

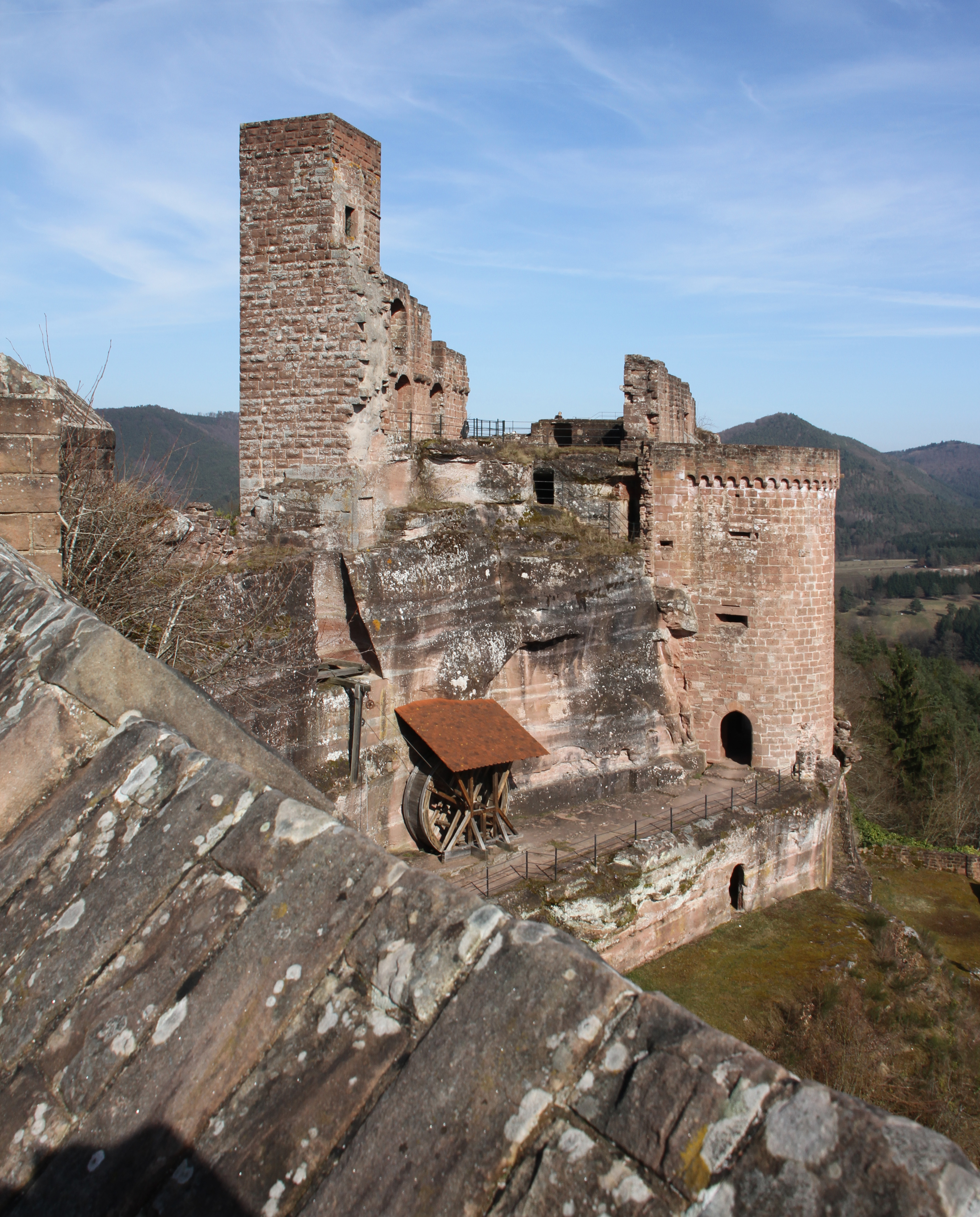

Altdahn Castle (German: Burg Altdahn) is a castle ruin in the Palatinate Forest, the German part of the Wasgau region. It is located near the town of Dahn in Rhineland-Palatinate, Germany. It stands 337 metres (1,106 ft) above sea level (NN).

== Location ==
The rock castle of Altdahn belongs to the group of castles at Dahn, which also includes Grafendahn and Tanstein. Although the three castles are sited next to one another on a low, rocky ridge, they were not built at the same time. A similar type of castle arrangement is also found e. g. in the nearby French Vosges in the upper Alsace where there is a cluster of three castles at Husseren-les-Châteaux.

Other sights nearby include the castle of Neudahn and the natural rock formation of Jungfernsprung.

== History ==
Altdahn was probably built in the early 13th century. Certainly in 1236 the castle was being run by Frederick of Dahn as a vassal (Lehnsmann) of the Bishop of Speyer who, at that time, was Conrad IV of Dahn and may well have been a relative. The subsequent history of the castle is characterized by many wars and frequent destruction, that was, time and again, followed by rebuilding.

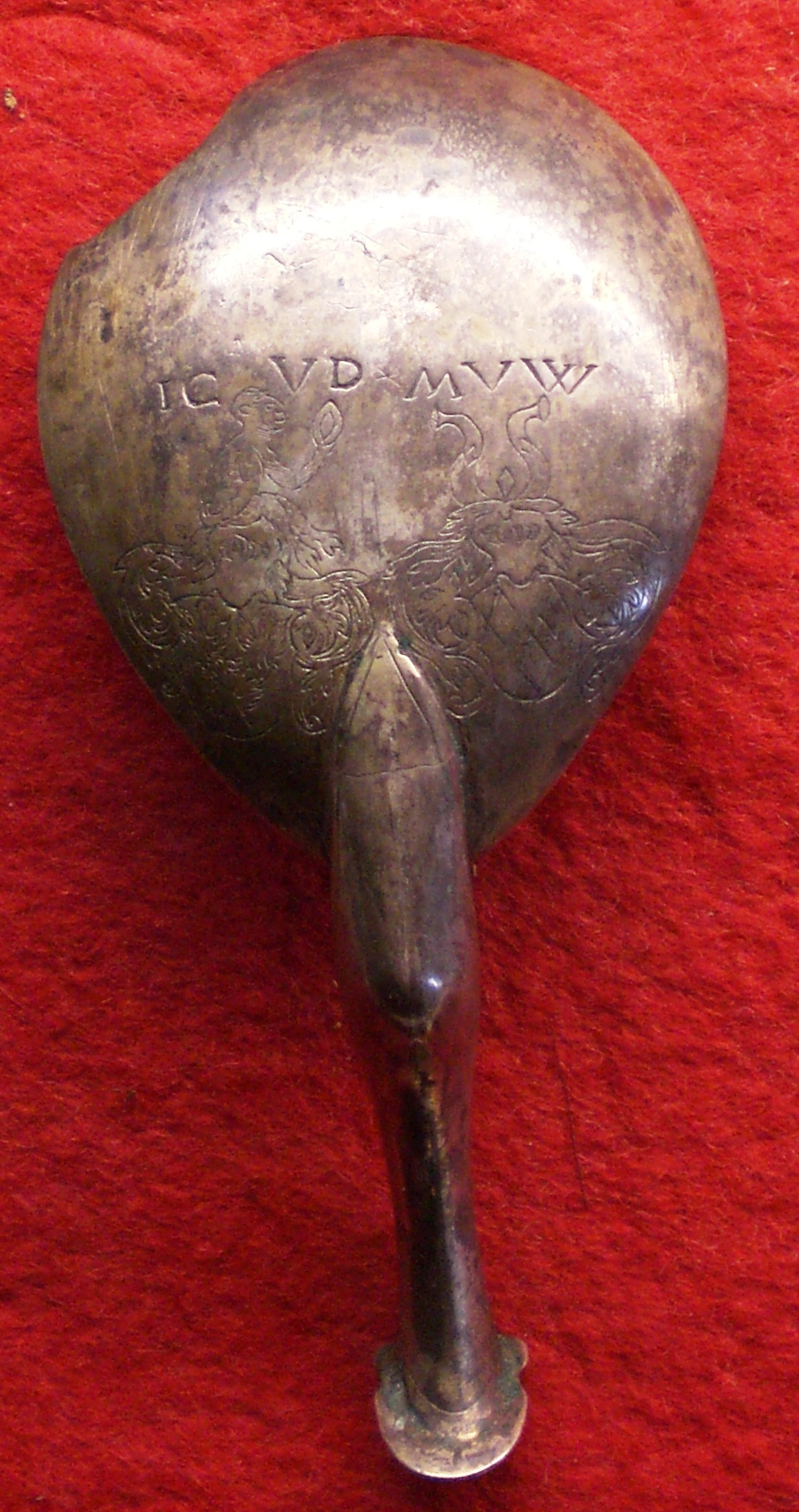
Spoon found at the castle engraved with the Dahn coat of arms

Altdahn was first destroyed in 1363 in the course of a feud between the Dahns and the Fleckensteins. In the end a squire took possession of the castle and carried out temporary repairs. In 1372 it was destroyed again and the squire driven out. In 1406 the castle was destroyed in the War of the Four Lords, which played out from 1405 to 1408 especially in the Bliesgau, 40 kilometres to the west. In 1426 and 1438 the castle caught fire without being caused by any military action.

After two centuries of relative prosperity Altdahn suffered further damage during the Thirty Years' War (1618–48). And right at the start of the War of the Palatine Succession the castle was finally destroyed in 1689 by French troops under General Mélac.

On 11 May 1820 a rockfall occurred, that caused the majority of the remaining ruins to collapse.

Mendelssohn, the composer and artist, visited the ruins on 5 August 1844 in order to paint them. The originals are in Oxford, but copies may be seen in the museum, as can a medieval silver spoon engraved with the coat of arms of the lords of Dahn.

== Description ==
On the ridge of the Dahn castle group, which run roughly from east-northeast to west-southwest, Altdahn Castle occupies the two largest, easternmost rock outcrops, which have a total length of about 100 metres (330 ft). Its access is in the northeast, where the gateway and a small, water-filled neck ditch have survived. The lower ward is dominated on the north side by a horseshoe-shaped turret (Geschützturm) and, on the south side, by another tower of similar design.

Other notable remains of the upper ward on the western rock outcrop that have survived, include the north wall of the palas and a watchtower that, from the remains of an oriel, indicate that it may well have been used as a garderobe tower. The southern part of the palas was destroyed in the rockslide of 1820. This also opened the remains of a round cavern, in the rock in the shape of an inverted cone, that has been identified as a cistern or dungeon. On the remains of the eastern side, rusticated ashlar stonework is visible.

The isolated eastern castle rock is accessible over a narrow gangway. It used to support a small tower.

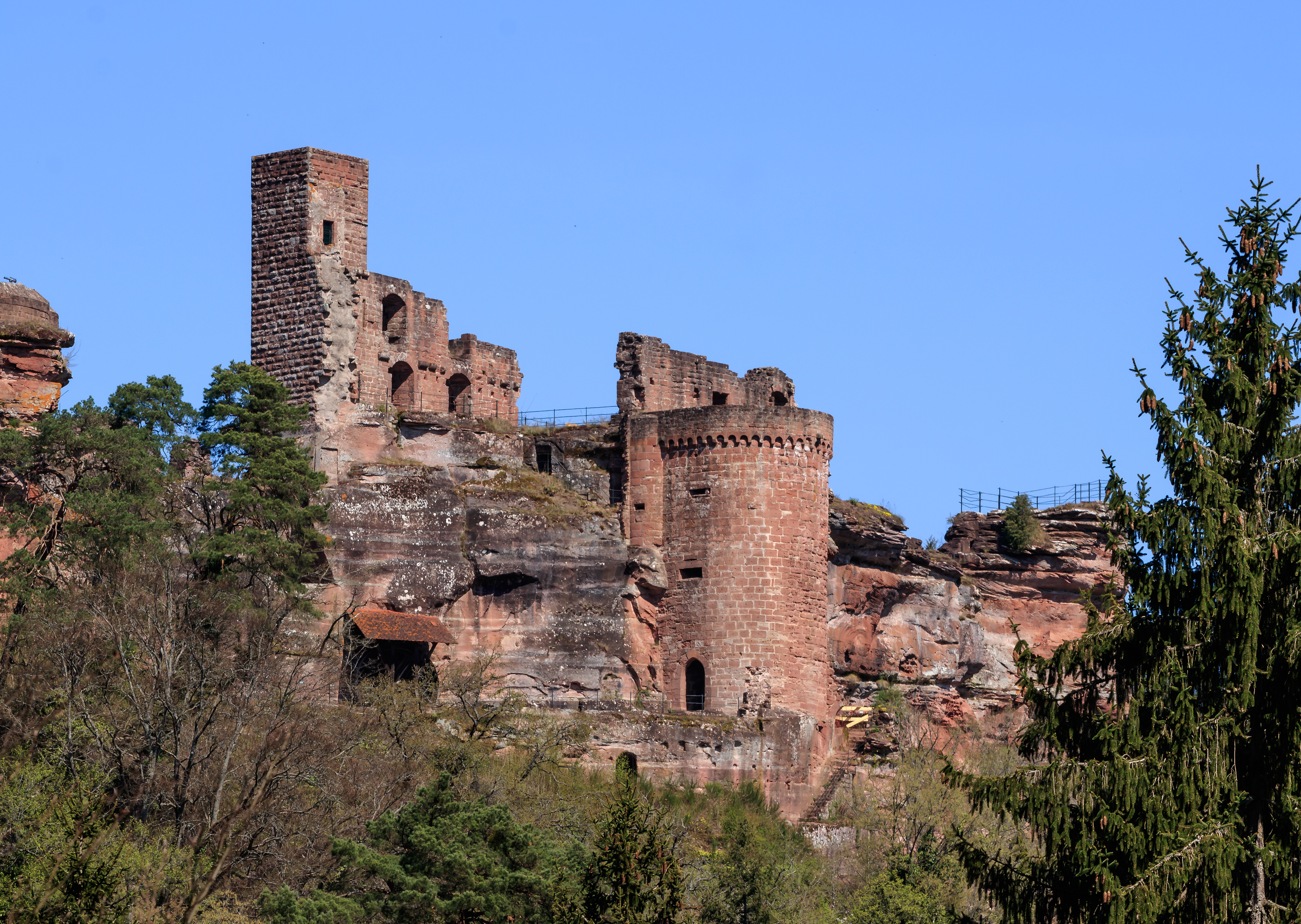
View from south

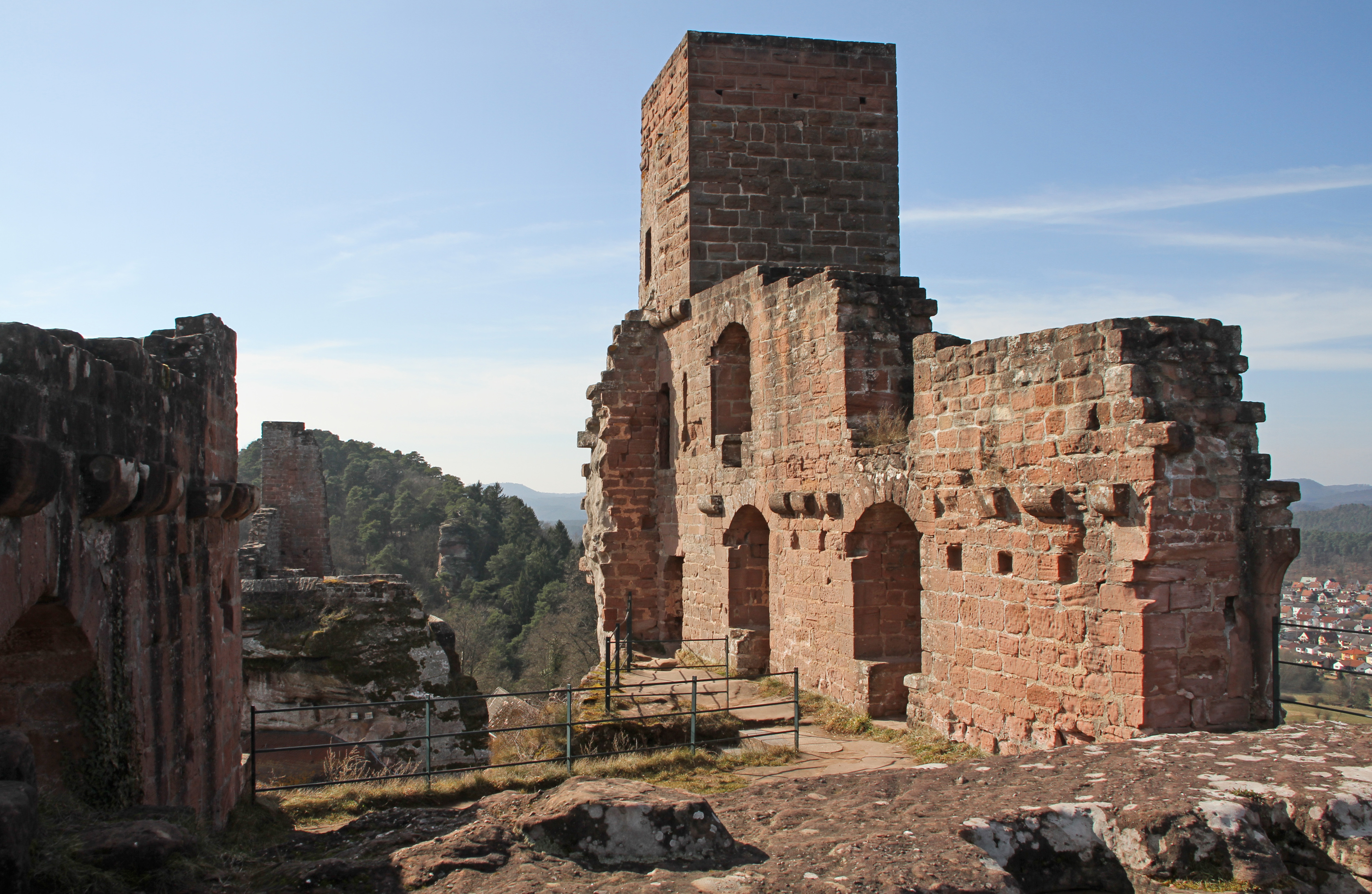
View of the surviving northern wall of the palas and tower

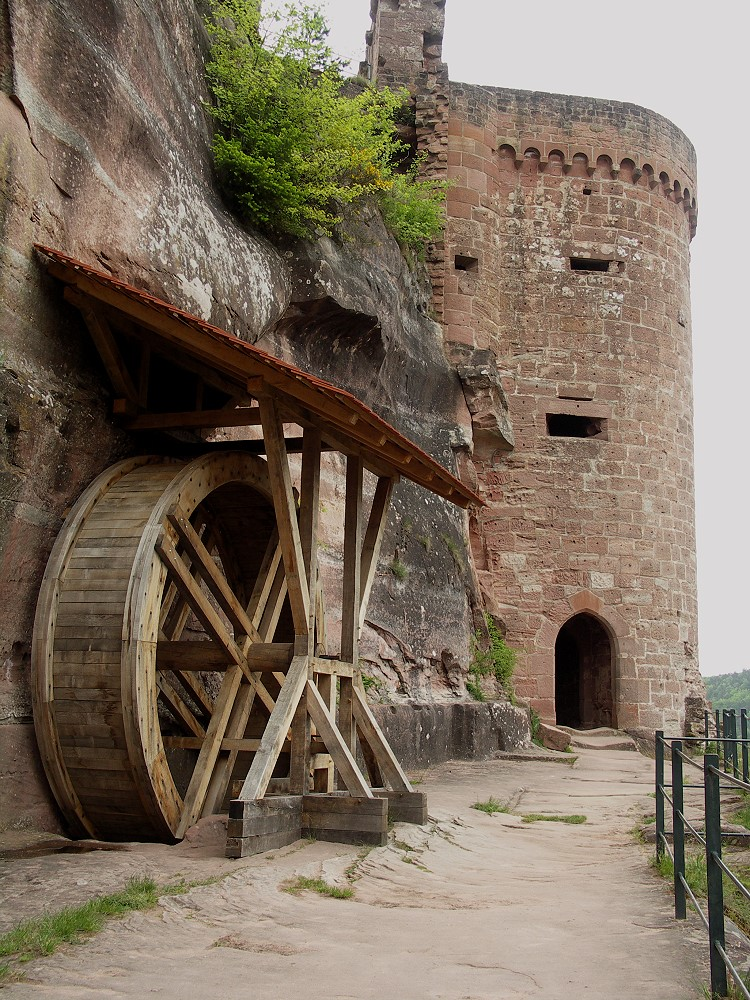
The South Tower and lifting wheel

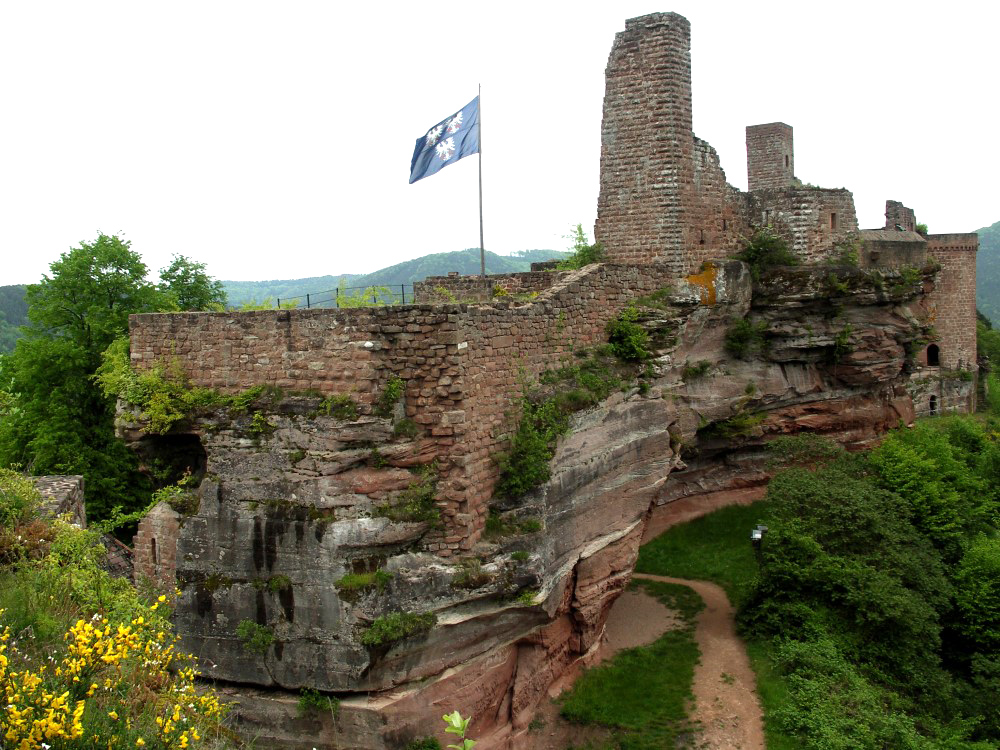
View of Altdahn from Tanstein looking over Grafendahn

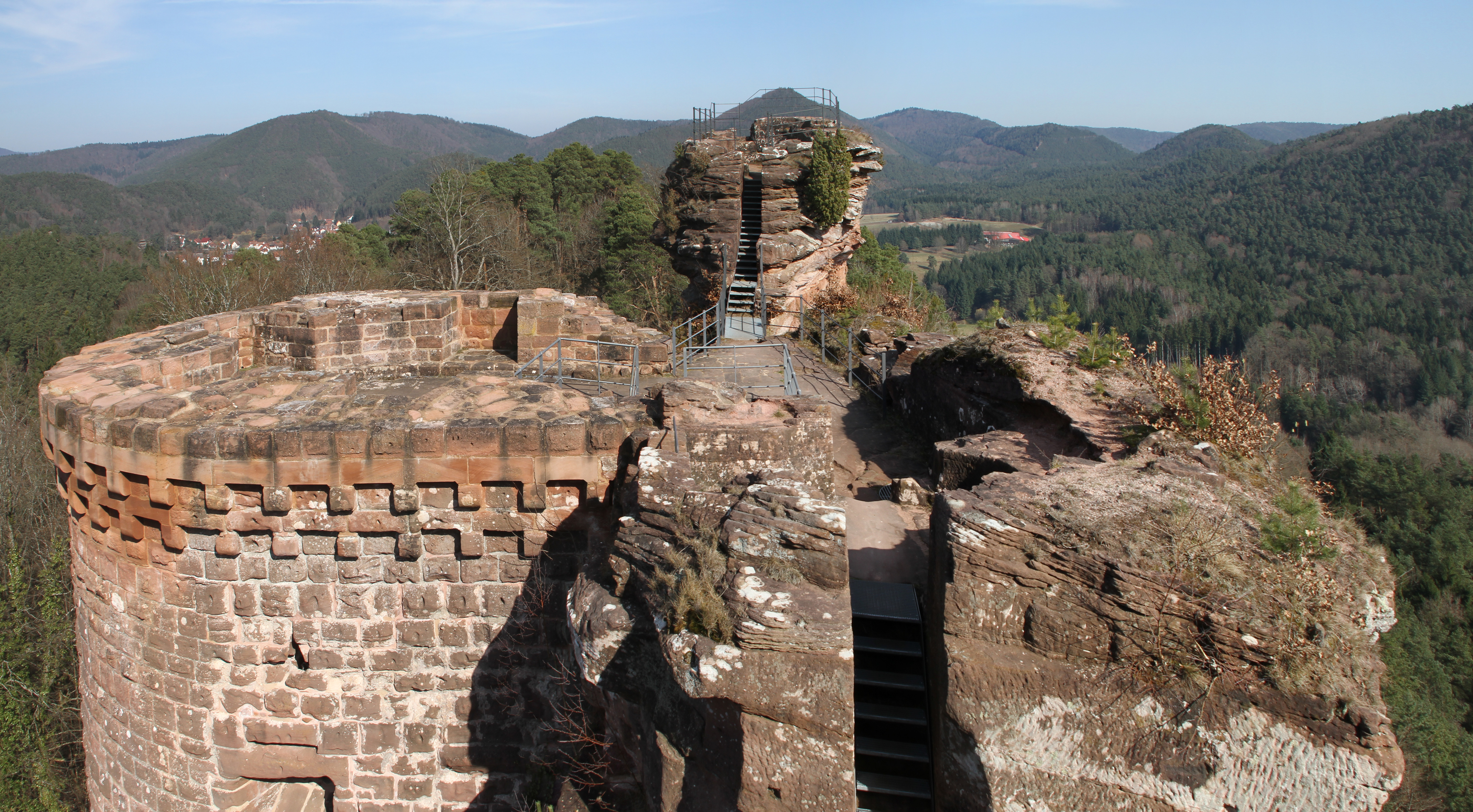
The North Tower

== Conservation measures ==
In 1877 the first conservation work was carried out by the Dahn Conservation Society (Dahner Verschönerungsverein) under the Bavarian government. In 1936, during the Nazi era, restoration work was restarted. After an interruption caused by the Second World War they continued from 1960 to the present day.

In 2007, cracks were confirmed on a 1,100 ton block of sandstone on the castle. If this were to break, a third of the castle would be destroyed. Geologists placed sensors against the rock in order to observe further changes. Using abutments on the ground, the rock was secured, but these measures were very expensive and time-consuming. The all clear was given in June 2008, because the sensors did not pick up any further movement of the rock. The electronic sensors were removed and replaced with manually readable "rock spies" (Felsspione). The rock will be closely watched for a further two years.

== Literature ==
- Marco Bollheimer (2011), Felsenburgen im Burgenparadies Wasgau–Nordvogesen (in German) (3rd ed.), Karlsruhe: Selbstverlag, pp. 64–65, ISBN 978-3-9814506-0-6
- Stefan Grathoff: Die Dahner Burgen. Alt-Dahn – Grafendahn – Tanstein. Führungsheft 21. Edition Burgen, Schlösser, Altertümer Rheinland Pfalz. Schnell und Steiner, Regensburg, 2003, ISBN 3-7954-1461-X.
- Walter Herrmann: Auf rotem Fels. Ein Führer zu den schönsten Burgen der Pfalz und des elsässischen Wasgau. DRW-Verlag Weinbrenner, Braun, Karlsruhe, 2004, ISBN 3-7650-8286-4.
- Elena Rey: Burgenführer Pfalz. Superior, Kaiserslautern 2003, ISBN 3-936216-15-0.
- Günter Stein: Burgen und Schlösser in der Pfalz. Ein Handbuch. Weidlich, Frankfurt 1976, ISBN 3-8035-8356-X.
- Alexander Thon, Peter Pohlit: Grafendahn. In: Jürgen Keddigkeit (ed.): Pfälzisches Burgenlexikon. Beiträge zur pfälzischen Geschichte Bd. 12/2, Institut für Pfälzische Geschichte und Volkskunde, Kaiserslautern, 2002, ISBN 3-927754-48-X, pp. 213–223.
- Alexander Thon (ed.): ...wie eine gebannte, unnahbare Zauberburg. Burgen in der Südpfalz. 2nd edition. Schnell und Steiner, Regensburg, 2005, ISBN 3-7954-1570-5, pp. 18–25.
