= Moosbach =

Moosbach may refer to:

== Places ==
- Moosbach, Austria, a town in the district of Braunau am Inn in Upper Austria
- Moosbach, Bavaria, a town in the district of Neustadt in Bavaria, Germany

== Rivers ==
- Moosbach (Lauter), a river of Rhineland-Palatinate, Germany, tributary of the Lauter
- Moosbach (Fichtenberger Rot), a river of Baden-Württemberg, Germany, tributary of the Fichtenberger Rot
- Moosbach (Mangfall), a river of Bavaria, Germany, tributary of the Mangfall
