= Castles of Dahn =

Group of three castles in Rhineland-Palatinate

Coordinates: 49°9′1″N 7°48′9″E

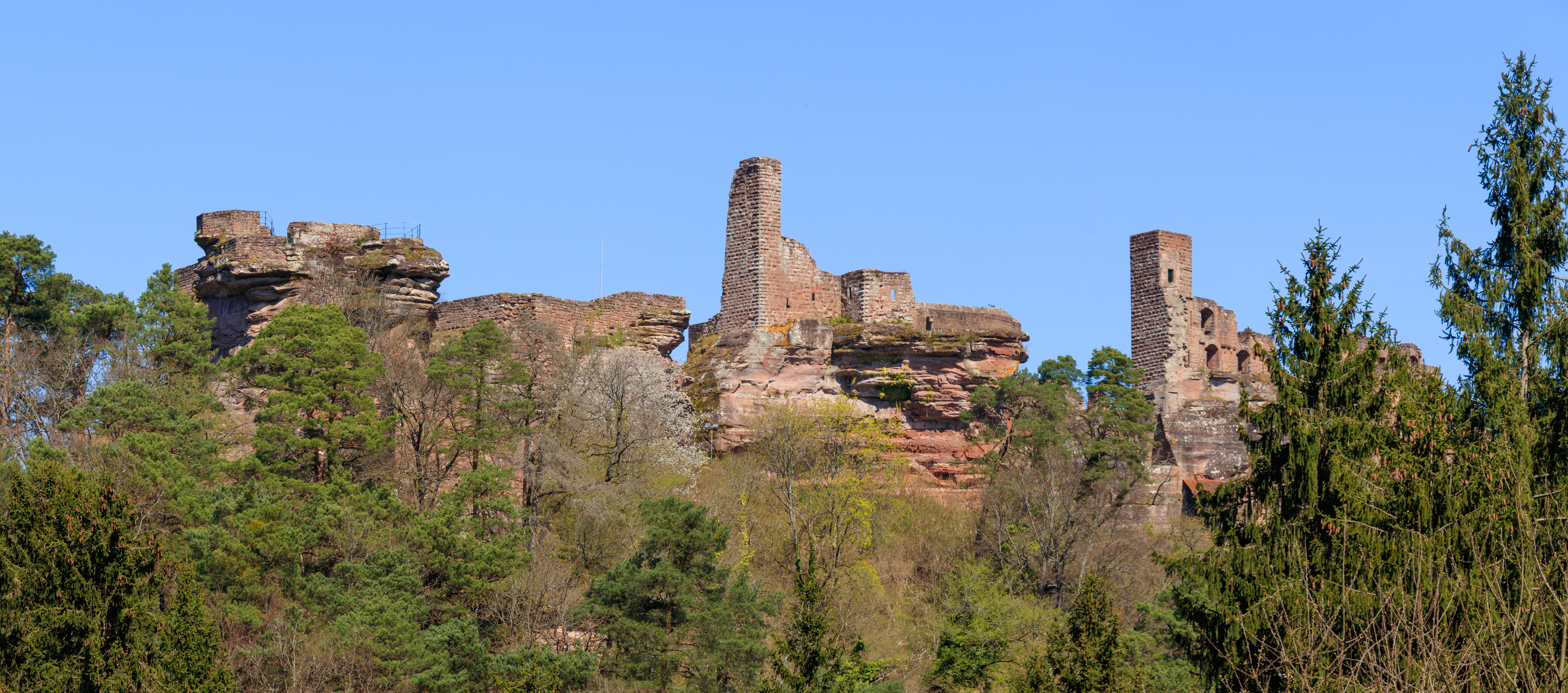
The castles at Dahn

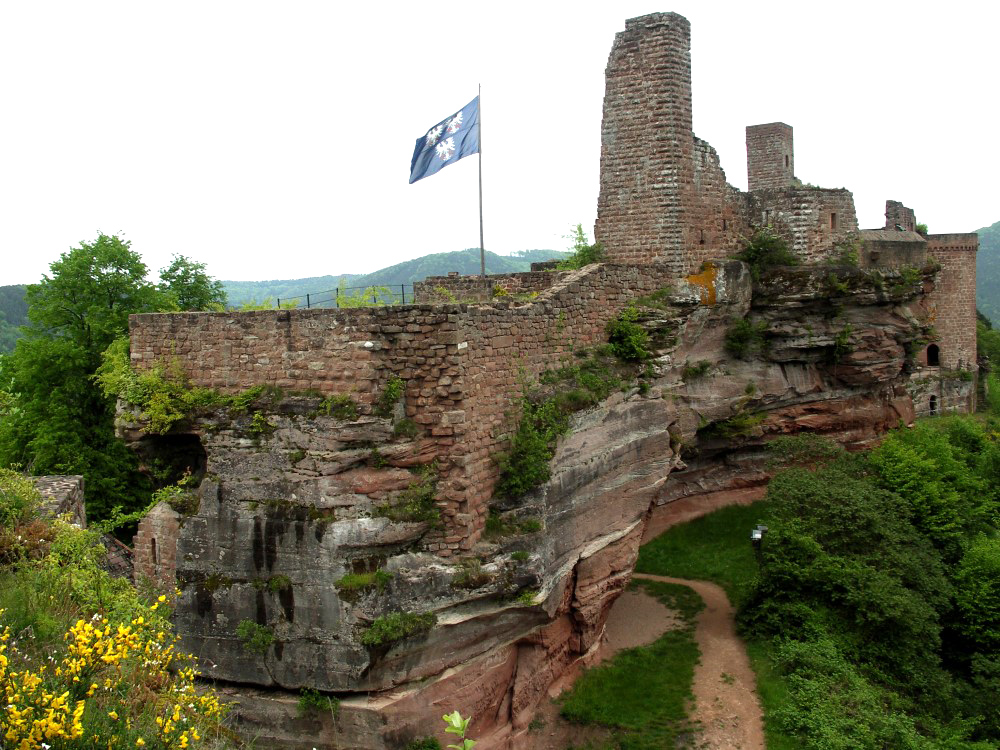
View from the Tanstein over the Grafendahn to the Altdahn

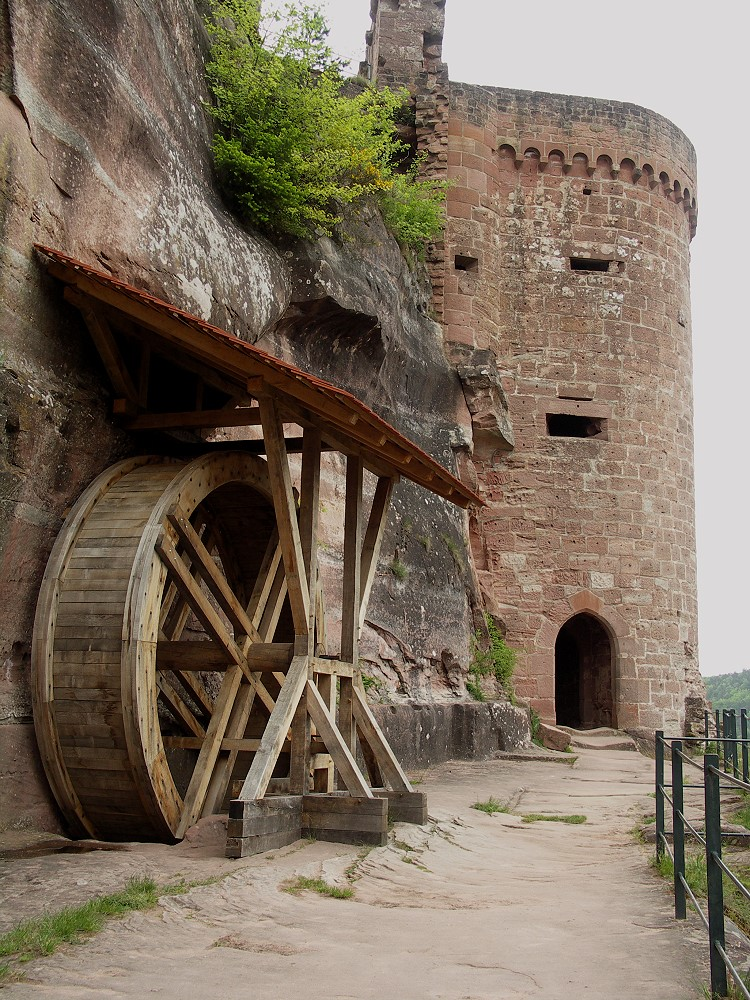
The Altdahn. South Tower and crane wheel

The castles of Dahn (German: Dahner Burgengruppe, literally "Dahn castle group"), near the little town of Dahn in the German state of Rhineland-Palatinate, consist of three rock castles:

- Altdahn
- Grafendahn
- Tanstein

== Geography ==
The so-called Dahner Felsenland area of the Wasgau, the region forming the southern part of the Palatine Forest and the northern part of the Vosges, has a large number of castles and rock formations. For example, 4 kilometres (2.5 mi) northwest of the castles at Dahn is Neudahn Castle and, close to the edge of the town, there are natural rock formations like the Jungfernsprung and the Bride and Groom (Braut und Bräutigam).

== History ==
The three castles were built next to one another, but not at the same time, utilizing five neighbouring rocks on a single ridge situated just under a kilometre east of Dahn. Their construction involved several generations of noble families from Dahn and lasted almost two centuries: Tanstein dates to the early 12th century; Altdahn to the early 13th century and Grafendahn to the late 13th century.

== Similar castle groups ==
A similar arrangement of two or three castles clustered closely together may be found in several places in the south part of neighbouring Alsatian Vosges: the Dreistein at Odilienberg near Obernai, the three castles on the Schlossberg near Reinhardsmunster, the Drei Exen near Eguisheim and the castle group of Haut-Kœnigsbourg/Oedenburg.

== Literature ==
- Stefan Grathoff (2003), Die Dahner Burgen. Alt-Dahn – Grafendahn – Tanstein : Führungsheft 21. Edition Burgen, Schlösser, Altertümer Rheinland Pfalz (in German), Regensburg: Schnell und Steiner, ISBN 3-7954-1461-X
- Walter Herrmann (2004), Auf rotem Fels : Ein Führer zu den schönsten Burgen der Pfalz und des elsässischen Wasgau (in German), Karlsruhe: DRW-Verlag Weinbrenner, Braun, ISBN 3-7650-8286-4
- Elena Rey (2003), Burgenführer Pfalz (in German), Kaiserslautern: Verlag Superior, ISBN 3-936216-15-0
- Günter Stein (1976), Burgen und Schlösser in der Pfalz : Ein Handbuch (in German), Frankfurt: Verlag Weidlich, ISBN 3-8035-8356-X
- Alexander Thon; Peter Pohlit (2002), "Grafendahn", in Jürgen Keddigkeit (ed.), Pfälzisches Burgenlexikon (in German), vol. Beiträge zur pfälzischen Geschichte Bd. 12/2, Kaiserslautern: Institut für Pfälzische Geschichte und Volkskunde, pp. 213–223, ISBN 3-927754-48-X
- Alexander Thon, ed. (2005), ...wie eine gebannte, unnahbare Zauberburg : Burgen in der Südpfalz. 2., verbesserte Auflage (in German), Regensburg: Schnell und Steiner, pp. 18–25, ISBN 3-7954-1570-5
- Burgenverein Dahn e. V., ed. (1989), Die Dahner Burgen. Alt-Dahn – Grafendahn – Tanstein – Neudahn : Geschichte und Burgenführer. 11., verbesserte Auflage (in German), Busenberg
