= Neudahn Castle =

- Burg Neudahn
- Dahn
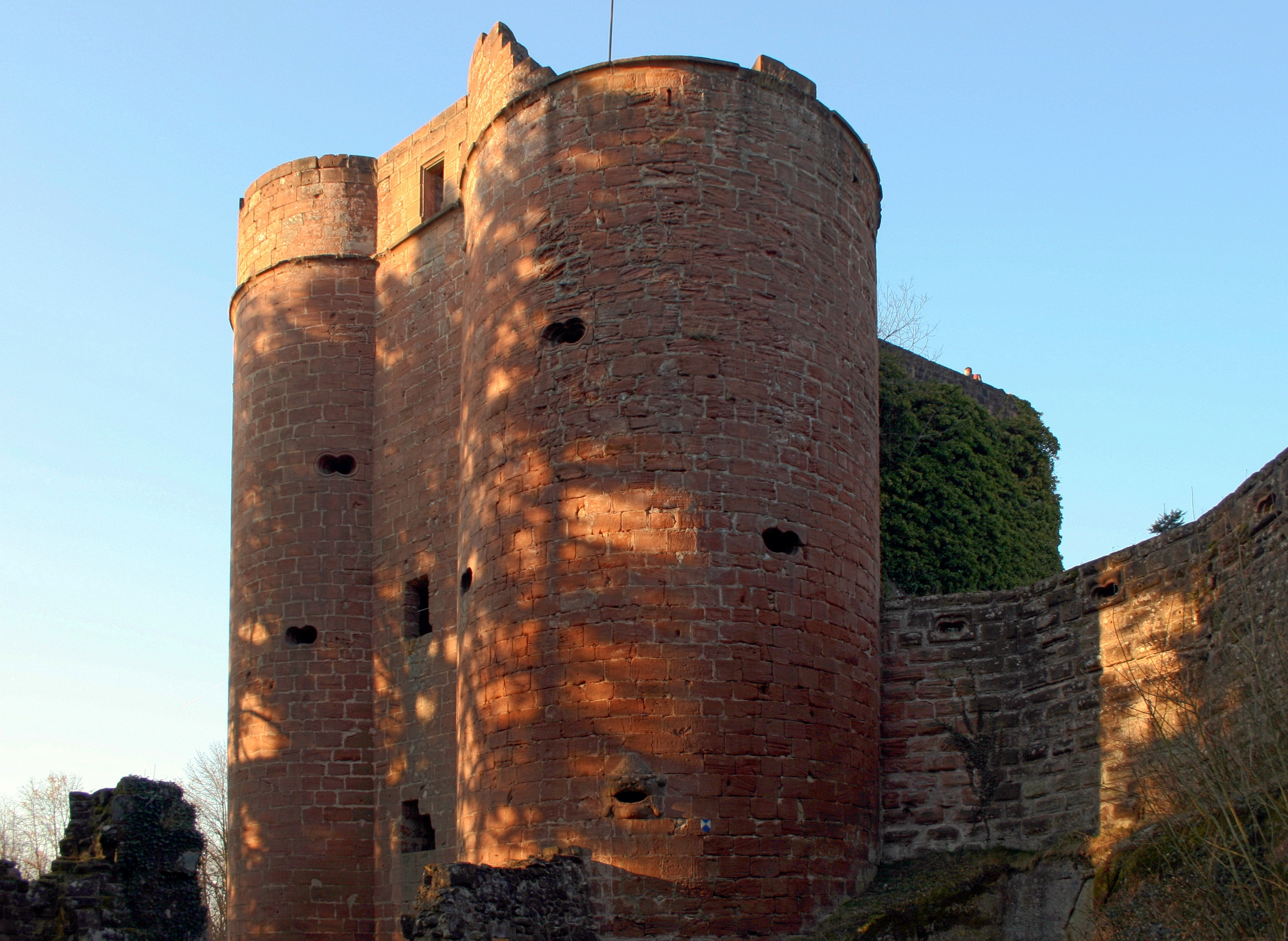
- The outer castle gate (left) and striking battery towers

Site information
- Type: rock castle on a spur
- Code: DE-RP
- Condition: ruins, part-restored

Location
- Coordinates: 49°09′47″N 7°45′26″E
- Height: 310 m above sea level (NN)

Site history
- Built: before 1240

Garrison information
- Occupants: ministeriales

The rock castle of Neudahn, in the southwestern Palatine Forest in the German state of Rhineland-Palatinate, is located at the northern end of an elongated ridge near the town of Dahn. The heart of the castle is situated on one of the sandstone rock outcrops that are typical of the Dahner Felsenland region.

== Geography ==
Neudahn lies 2 kilometres northwest of Dahn, right of the River Lauter, which is known here in its upper reaches as the Wieslauter. The castle stands atop the Kauertberg hill, about 90 metres above the valley floor. The main castle rock is 310 metres above sea level, that of the lower ward reaches 290 metres. Immediately below the castle the Moosbach stream, which is impounded in a small woog used to feed an old mill, empties into the Wieslauter.

== History ==
The name "Neudahn" ("New Dahn") is rather confusing, because the castle is older than Grafendahn Castle in the nearby group of three castles of Dahn, albeit more recent than Altdahn ("Old Dahn"). Its location enabled it to protect and block the old road running through the Wieslauter valley, the course of which is now used by the B 427 federal highway and the Wieslauter Railway.

The castle was probably built just before 1240 by order of the Bishop of Speyer, because from 1233 to 1236 the office was held by a certain Conrad IV of Dahn. The governing ministerialis was Henry of Dahn, who is also recorded as Henry Mursel of Kropsberg. He was probably granted the castle from the outset as a heritable fief. His second name, like other later heirs, indicates clearly that there were family ties with the South Palatinate – Kropsburg and Burrweiler.

The castles is first mentioned on 3 May 1285 as Burg Than, an assessment of the estate mentioned in the deed indicating that it must refer to Neudahn. p

Within a hundred years of the castle being built, the Mursel family died out, and its possession passed to the related Altdahn line. Probably razed during the Four Lords' War of 1438 and then rebuilt, the site was again badly damaged during the German Peasants' War in 1525. Because, King Henry II of France stayed overnight at the castle in 1552, it must have been thoroughly renovated before then. After the last lord of Dahn, Ludwig II died in 1603 in his castle at Burrweiler, Neudahn was returned to the Prince-Bishopric of Speyer. From then on the castle was used by the episcopal Amtmann as his headquarters until French troops finally destroyed it in 1689 at the start of the War of the Palatine Succession.

Today the castle appears to visitors largely as it did in the renovation and extension phase in the period after 1525 and after the last destruction.

Safety and restoration measures took place in the 1970s. The site is managed by the Generaldirektion Kulturelles Erbe Rheinland-Pfalz, Direktion Burgen, Schlösser, Altertümer, and, together with Berwartstein Castle, 10 kilometres away, is one of the best preserved castles in the southern Palatine Forest.

== Site ==
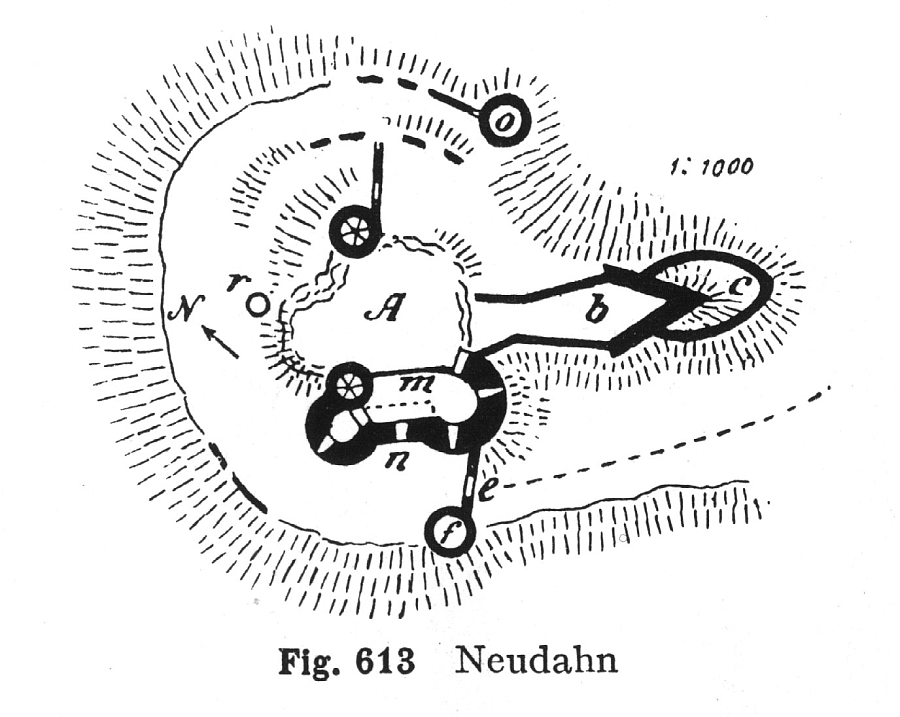
Plan of the castle

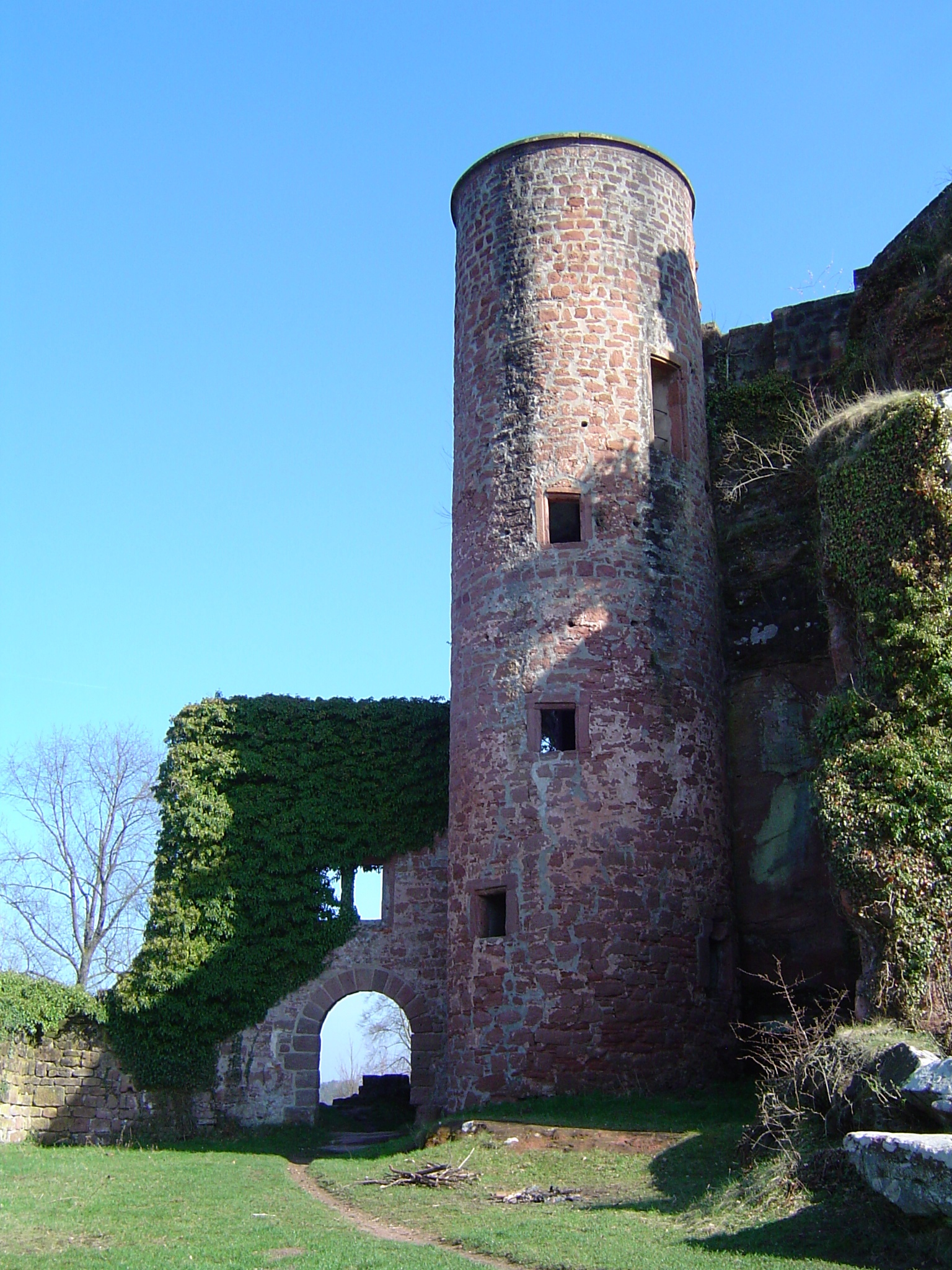
Inner gate and newel tower

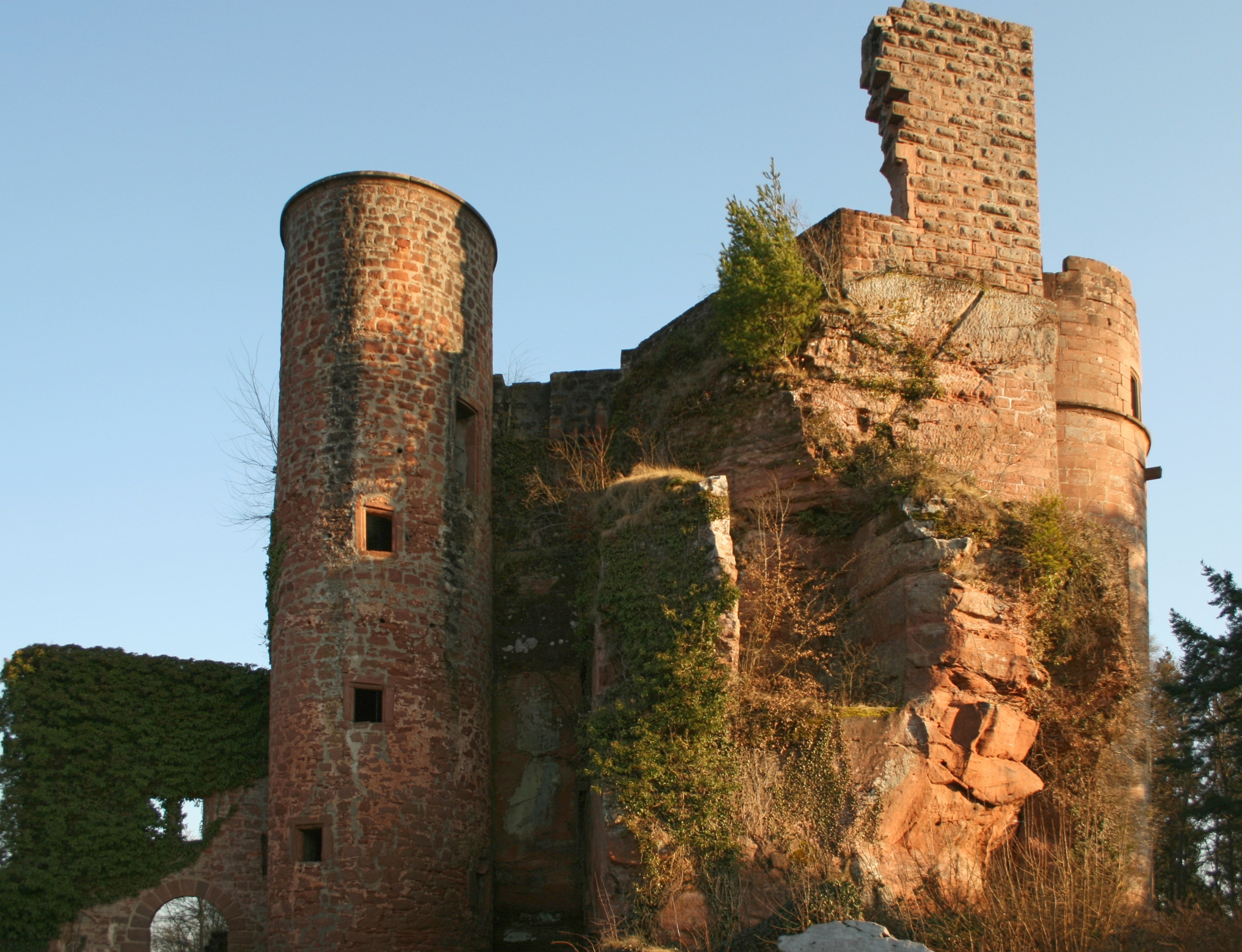
North side. From the left: inner gate, newel tower and remains of domestic buildings in the upper ward on the sandstone rocks

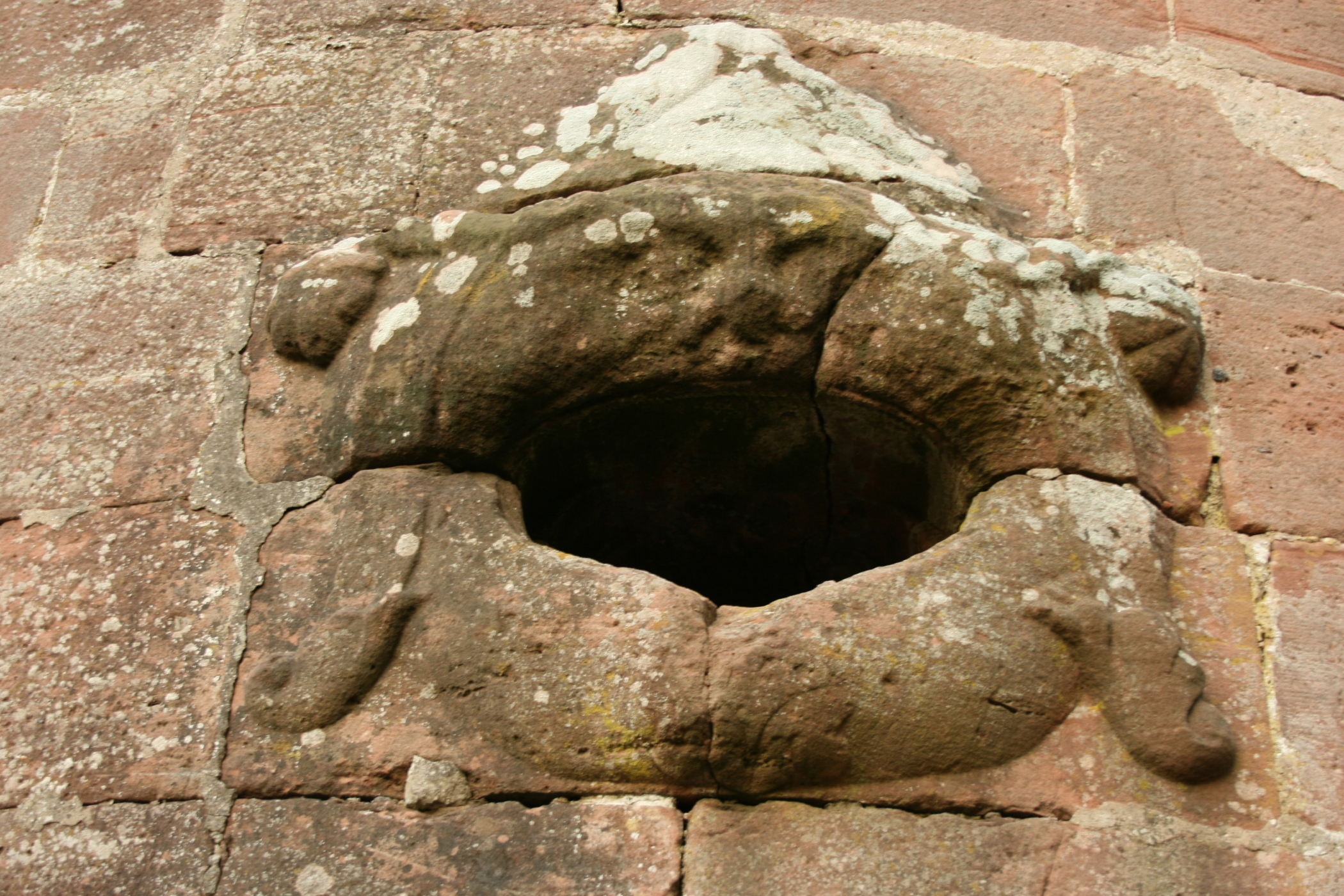
Embrasures on the southern battery tower

Left of the place where the original gates were located, in the southeast, are the remains of a tower, 7 metres in diameter. From this tower, parts of a thick defensive wall runs westwards, before bending north. On the steep northern and northeastern side of the hillside the wall has entirely disappeared. It led to the flanking tower at the northern end of the site.

Of the oldest – late Hohenstaufen – castle on the vertically hewn, central rock outcrop, which is just under 20 metres high, the only surviving features are a cistern at the western end and the southern wall of the small palas with its window and door openings. At the northwestern end of the main rock outcrop in the south was a late medieval domestic building and, west of that, a well. A formerly plastered newel tower from the same period on the northwestern edge of the rock outcrop leads up to the upper ward. The actual entrance into the ground floor is, as on many castles, probably not authentic and may have been made for modern visitors, which the date 1975 over the entrance suggests. It also lies outside the inner gate. The historic entrance is inside the gate to the left and at a higher level.

The dominant image of the castle is the two four-storey, roughly 24 metre-high, battery towers on the opposite side. They date to the first half of the 16th century. The west tower measures about 7 metres in height, the east tower, about 10 metres. The thickness of the walls is about 3 metres. Two embrasures (so-called Maulscharten) on the southern battery tower have been ornately carved into the shape of lions' faces.

On the continuation of the hill to the east-southeast the site was protected by a wedge-shaped bastion that was also a recognition feature of Neudahn. Its shape was intended to prevent shells from striking the castle frontally. It protected the upper ward on the more gentle slope of the hill on that side. The bastion and the weapon towers show that, in the late Middle Ages, considerable modifications to the castle were carried out and the lords of the castle took account of the introduction of firearms and cannon.

== Literature ==
- Marco Bollheimer (2011), Felsenburgen im Burgenparadies Wasgau–Nordvogesen (in German) (3rd ed.), Karlsruhe: Selbstverlag, pp. 60 f, ISBN 978-3-9814506-0-6
- Eckhard Braun: Pfälzische Burgen und Feuerwaffen. Meyer, Hauenstein, 1997, p. 467–482, ISBN 3-927891-07-X.
- Stefan Grathoff: Die Dahner Burgen. Alt-Dahn – Grafendahn – Tanstein. Führungsheft 21st edn. Burgen, Schlösser, Altertümer Rheinland Pfalz. Schnell und Steiner, Regensburg, 2003. ISBN 3-7954-1461-X.
- Alexander Thon (ed.): ... wie eine gebannte, unnahbare Zauberburg. Burgen in der Südpfalz. 2nd improved edition. Schnell und Steiner, Regensburg, 2005, pp. 112–117, ISBN 3795415705.
