= Tanstein Castle =

Castle in Germany

- Burg Tanstein
- Dahn
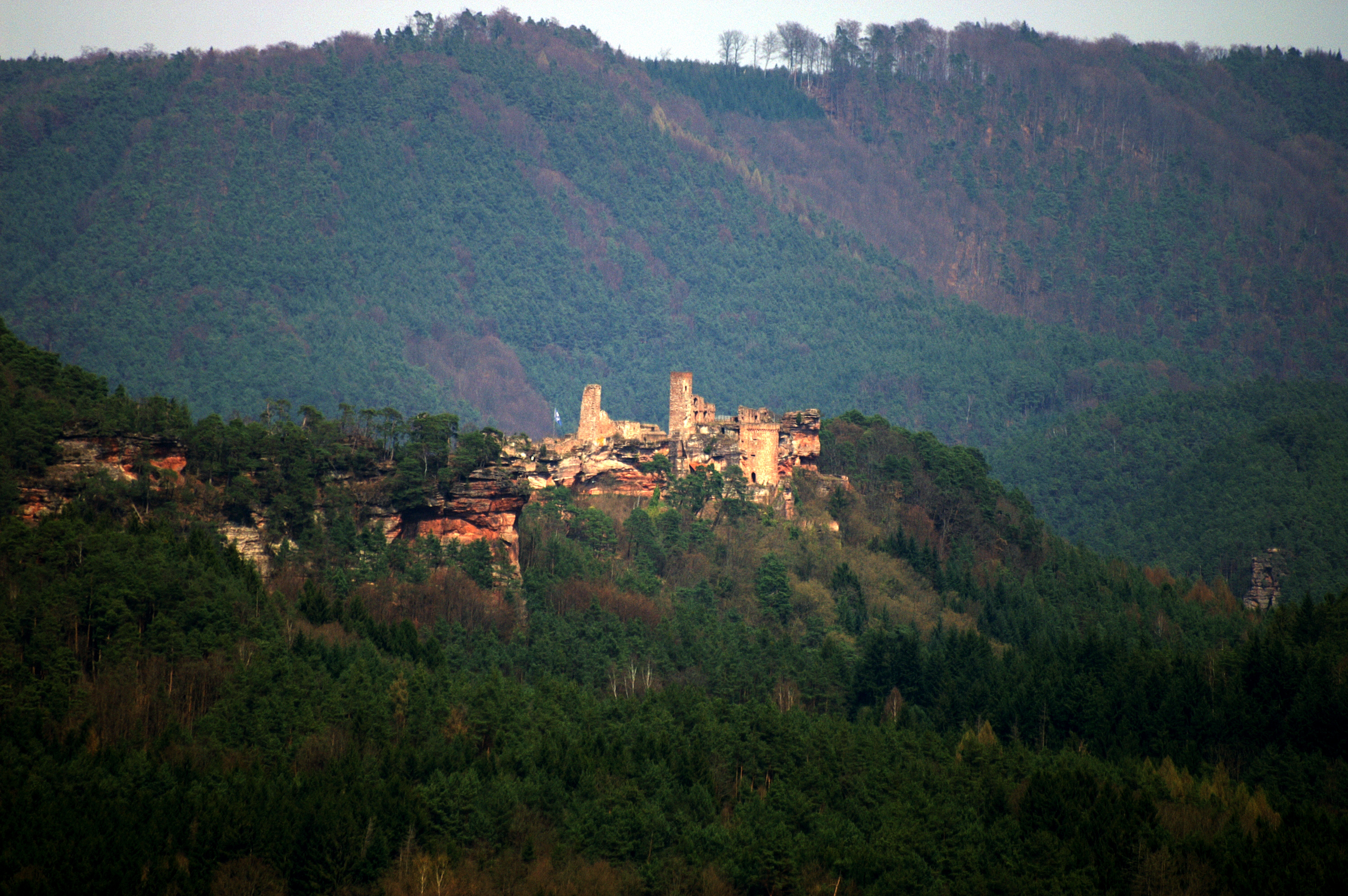
- The castles of Dahn

Site information
- Type: hill castle, on rock outcrop
- Code: DE-RP
- Condition: ruin

Location
- Coordinates: 49°09′01″N 7°48′11″E

Site history
- Built: between 1100 and 1127

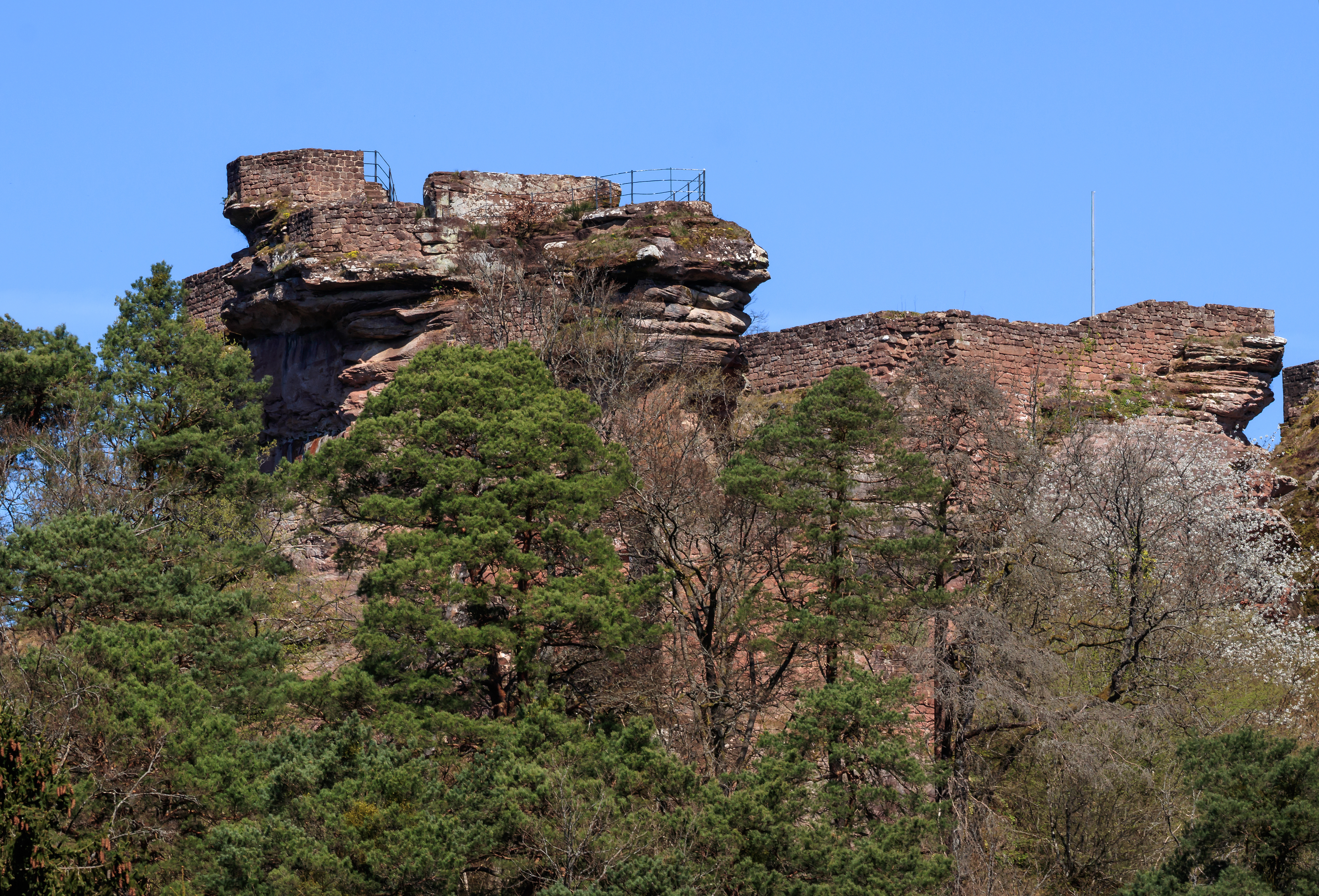
View from south

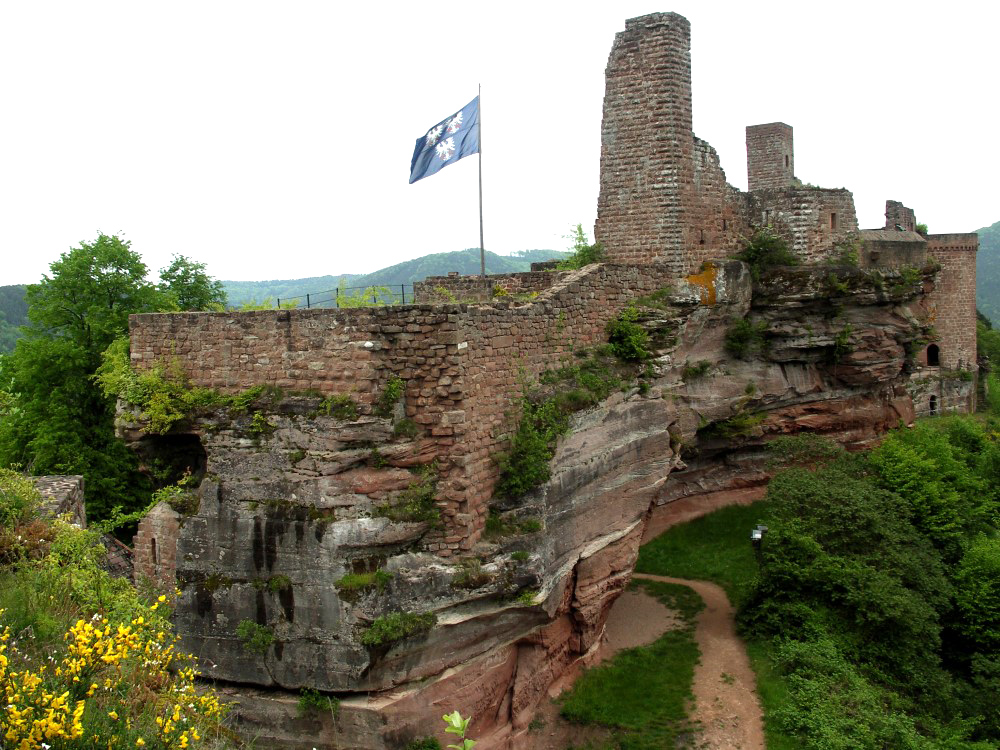
View from Tanstein over Grafendahn to Altdahn

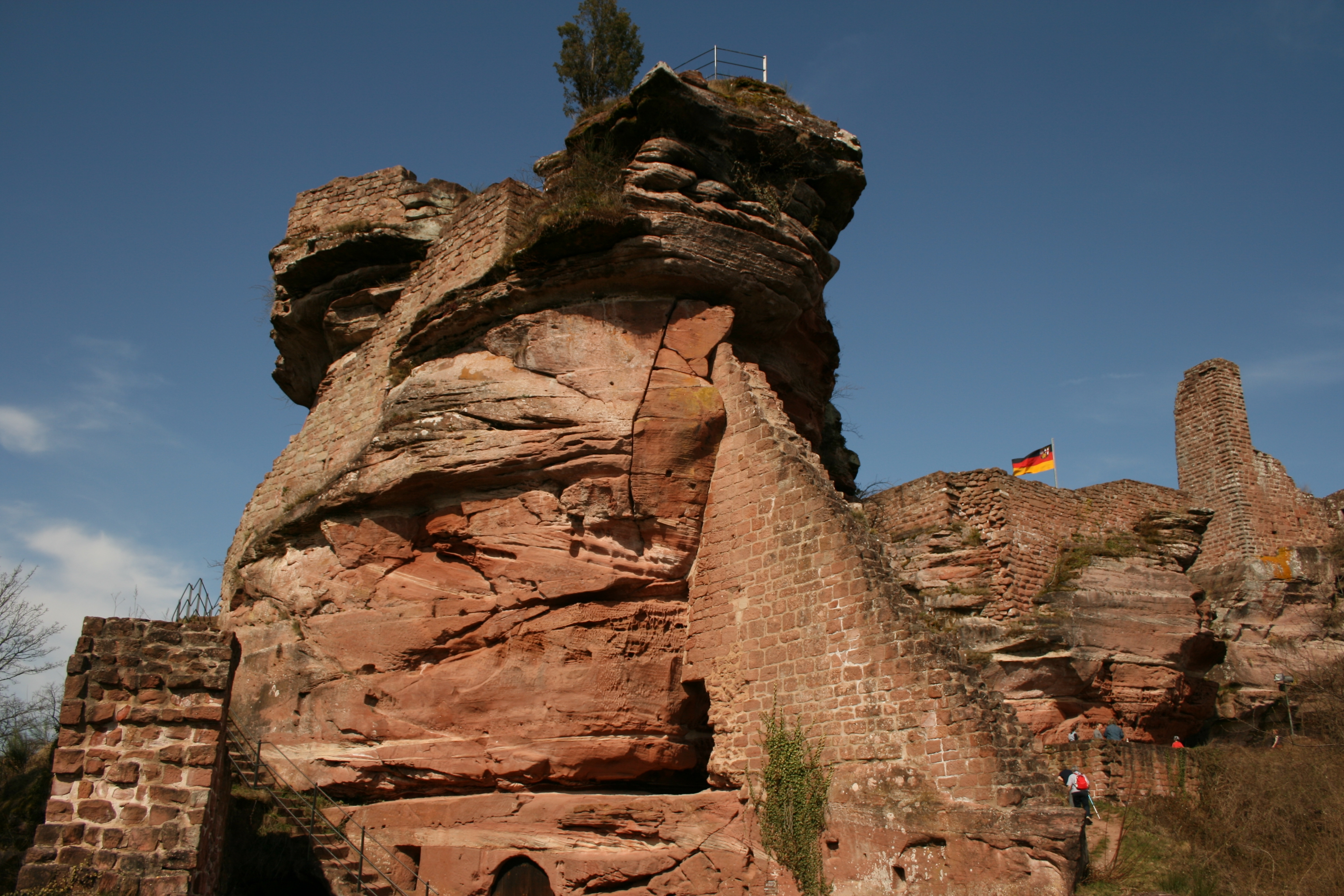
View from the lower ward to the south.

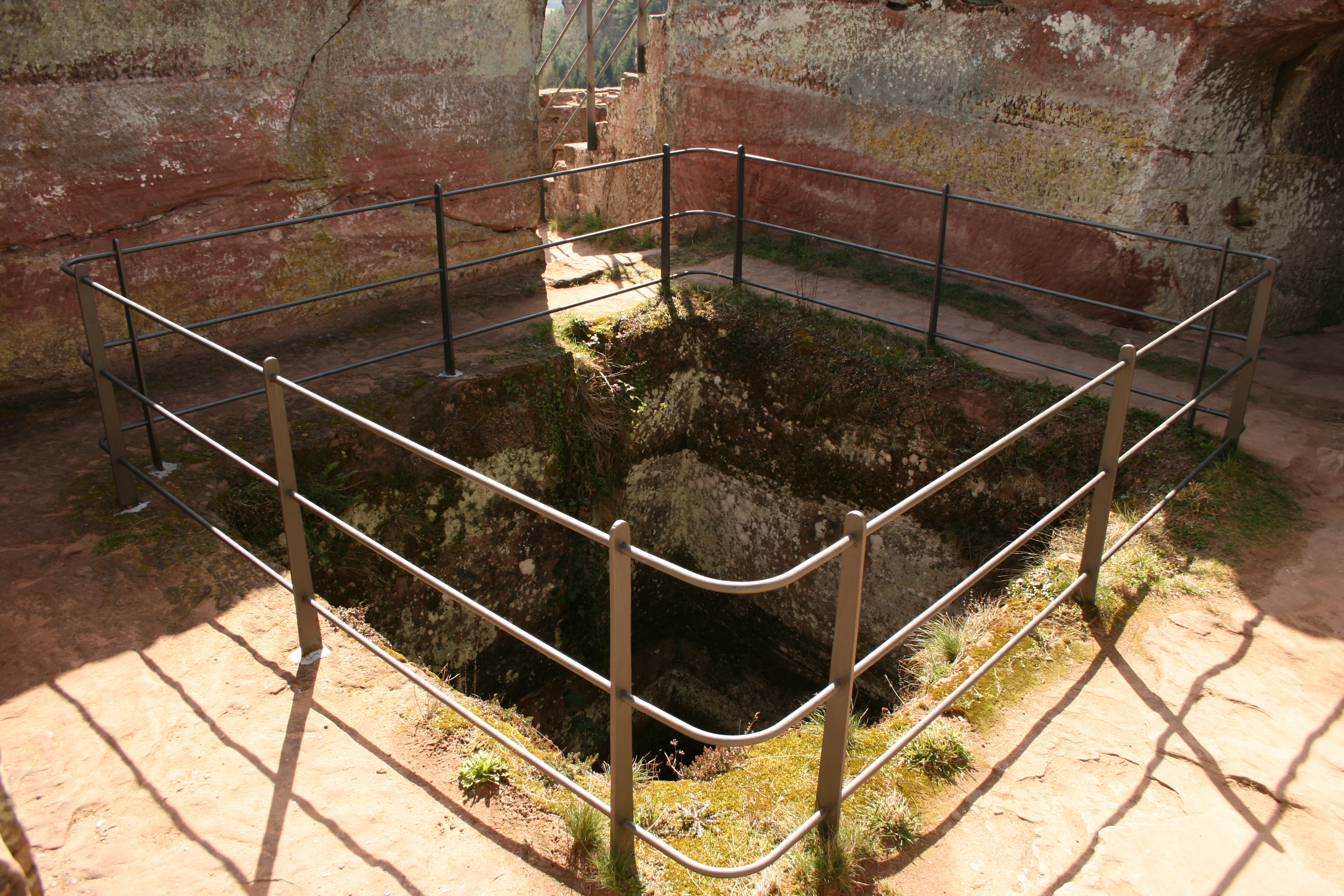
Cistern in the western rock outcrop

Tanstein Castle (German: Burg Tanstein) is the ruin of a rock castle in the southern Palatine Forest, the German part of the Wasgau region. It lies just under a kilometre east of the small town of Dahn in the state of Rhineland-Palatinate.

== Location ==
Tanstein is one of the three castles at Dahn; the others being Altdahn and Grafendahn. Although the three castles are sited next to one another on a hill ridge, they were not built at the same time. A similar cluster of castles are also found in the Vosges in nearby Alsace: the three castles of Husseren.

== History ==
Tanstein is the oldest of the three castles in the group. An 1127 document refers to an Anshelmus de Tannicka as the owner or governor; as a result the castle was probably built in the early 12th century. In 1189, in a deed by Emperor Frederick Barbarossa, a Henry von der Than is mentioned and the castle designated as an immediate imperial fief. In the period that followed, Ulrich of Dahn and Conrad of Dahn are named as imperial ministeriales. In 1328 the castle became a fief of the bishops of Speyer. Until 1464 there were frequent changes of ownership, which suggests that the fief was still not inheritable during this phase, but was always re-enfeoffed.

In 1512 Frederick of Dahn purchased the castle. Because he was an ally of the knight, Franz von Sickingen, he was involved in his battles against the imperial princes in southwest Germany. After Sickingen's defeat and death in 1523, Tanstein, too, fell into the hands of the victors. Its occupation by troops of the Archbishop of Trier lasted until 1544 and probably led to irreparable damage to the structure of the castle, because it was finally abandoned in 1585. In 1689, at the start of the War of the Palatine Succession, the French completely destroyed the ruins.

== Site ==
Tanstein Castle is located on the two westernmost rock outcrops of the Dahn castle cluster. Both were originally linked by a bridge. On the rocks today are modern parapet walls that have been rather arbitrarily added and do not give any real idea of the old castle buildings. On the western rock outcrop there were apparently domestic-like buildings, that were built against the rocks. This is evinced by putlock holes and other marks on the rocks as well as a large cistern, in which water from the roofs was gathered and stored.

The lower ward on the southern rock outcrop still shows traces of the original walls dating to the 15th century. These include the ruins of a smithy and a smelting furnace.

== Literature ==
- Stefan Grathoff: Die Dahner Burgen. Alt-Dahn – Grafendahn – Tanstein. Führungsheft 21st edn., Burgen, Schlösser, Altertümer Rheinland Pfalz. Schnell und Steiner, Regensburg, 2003. ISBN 3-7954-1461-X
- Walter Herrmann: Auf rotem Fels. Ein Führer zu den schönsten Burgen der Pfalz und des elsässischen Wasgau. DRW-Verl. Weinbrenner, Braun, Karlsruhe, 2004, ISBN 3-7650-8286-4
- Elena Rey: Burgenführer Pfalz. Superior, Kaiserslautern 2003, ISBN 3-936216-15-0
- Günter Stein: Burgen und Schlösser in der Pfalz. Ein Handbuch. Weidlich, Frankfurt, 1976, ISBN 3-8035-8356-X
- Alexander Thon, Peter Pohlit: Grafendahn. In: Jürgen Keddigkeit (ed.): Pfälzisches Burgenlexikon. Beiträge zur pfälzischen Geschichte Vol. 12/2, Institut für Pfälzische Geschichte und Volkskunde, Kaiserslautern, 2002, pp. 213-223, ISBN 3-927754-48-X
- Alexander Thon (ed.): ...wie eine gebannte, unnahbare Zauberburg. Burgen in der Südpfalz. 2nd rev. edn., Schnell + Steiner, Regensburg, 2005, pp. 18-25, ISBN 3-7954-1570-5
