= Moosbach (Lauter) =

River in Germany

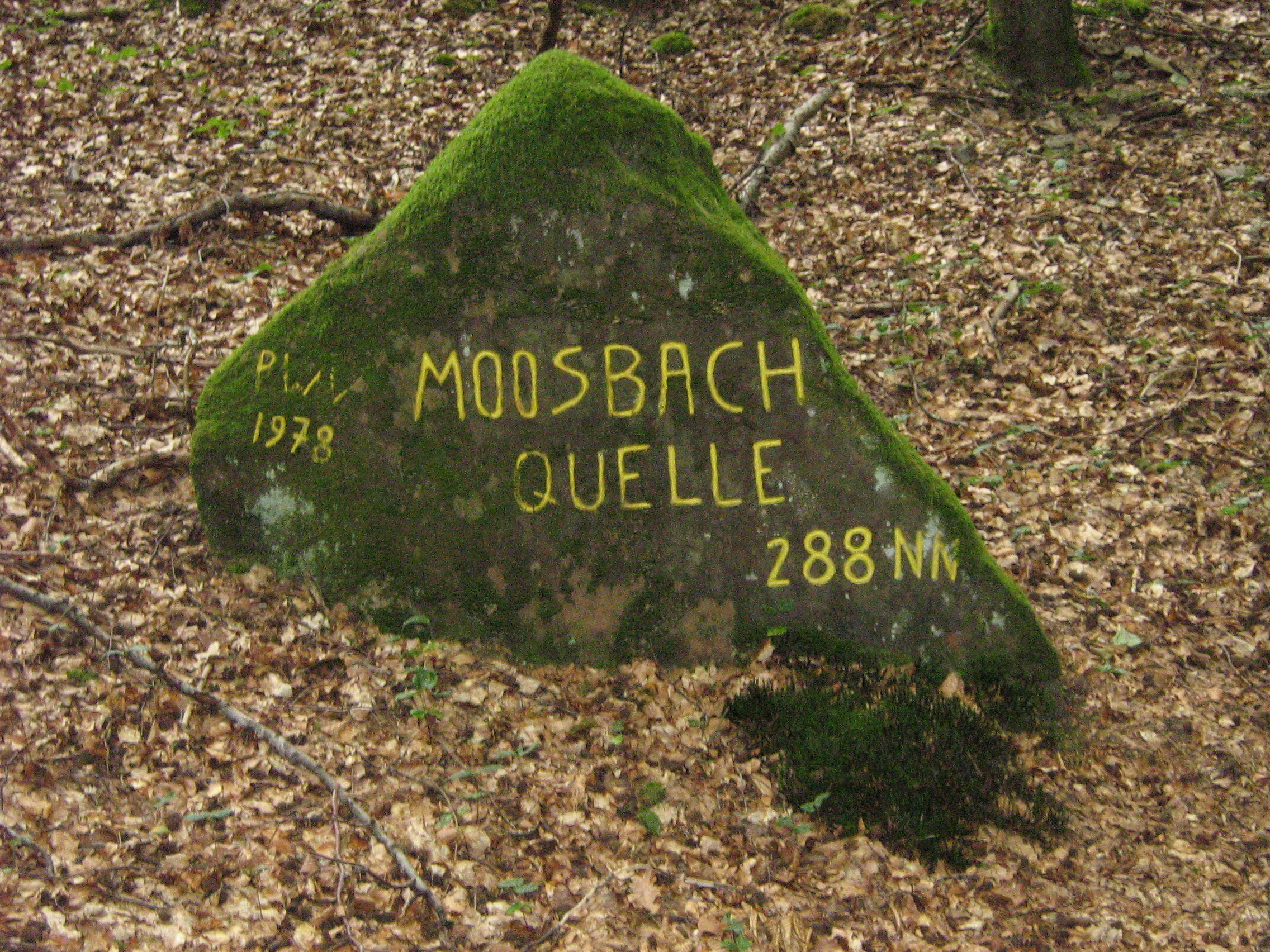
- A Ritterstein by the source of the Moosbach

Location
- Country: Germany
- State: Rhineland-Palatinate
- District: Südwestpfalz
- Reference no.: DE: 23726

Physical characteristics
- Source
  - location: in the Dahner Felsenland southwest of the Kaletschkopf
  - coordinates: 49°07′51″N 7°42′52″E
  - elevation: 289 m above sea level (NN)
- Mouth
  - location: northwest of Dahn into the Wieslauter
  - coordinates: 49°09′56″N 7°45′22″E
  - elevation: 206 m above sea level (NN)
- Length: 6.60 km (4.10 mi)
- Basin size: 13.605 km^{2} (5.253 sq mi)

Basin features
- Progression: Lauter→ Rhine→ North Sea

The Moosbach (German pronunciation: [ˈmoːsbax]) is a stream, approximately 6.6 kilometres (4.1 mi) long, in the South Palatine part of the Wasgau region in the German state of Rhineland-Palatinate. It is a right tributary of the Lauter, whose upper reaches are known as the Wieslauter.

== Geography ==
=== Course ===
The Moosbach rises at a height of 289 m above NN in the central Wasgau in the region known as the Dahner Felsenland, southwest of the Kaletschkopf hill (453.1 m above NN) in a woodland within the Moosbachtal Nature reserve. Its source is a spring called the Moosbrunnen. It initially presses northwards through a narrow, wooded valley between the Red Rock (Roten Felsen) on the left and the Kaletschkopf on the right. At the Moosbach-Halde it changes direction to run northeast and then fills a small pond south of the Moosbachhütte hut and shortly thereafter the rather larger and very scenic pond of Kranzwoog. Very gradually it turns towards the east. It runs along the southern slopes of the Lehmberg (386.2 m above NN). South of the Wolfdell it passes through two more small ponds in succession and its then fed from the right by the Seibertsbach stream coming from the south. About 300 metres (1,000 ft) downstream the Moosbach bends to the left and now flows in a northerly direction west of the Mehrsberg (328.2 m above NN). Shortly afterwards it passes through the Neudahner Weiher, which lies on the southeastern slopes of the Sägköpfchen (317.9 m above NN). To the east, not far from this lake, rises Neudahn Castle. The Moosbach empties from the right into the Wieslauter at a height of 206 m above NN.

=== Tributaries ===
- Seibertsbach (right), 4.2 km

== Biosphere ==
The nature reserve of Moosbachtal ist 111 hectares in area. Its calcareous grassland, wet meadows, intermediate bogs, dystrophic ponds with siltation zones, springs, streams, bushes and woods offer a multitude of species their own habitat, so that it forms one of the most important reserves in Südwestpfalz.

=== Flora ===
Alder grows in the carrs in the valley, albeit threatened at times by spruce and beech, and in the wet meadows deer fern, milk parsley, yellow flag and marsh marigold thrive. Cranberries, bog pondweed, tussock sedge, bogbean, cottongrass, water lilies, marsh gentian and bog arum also grow richly here. One feature of the valley is the occurrence of the fungi, alder bracket and lilac milk cap.

=== Fauna ===
Grass snakes, Alpine newts, Common toads and Common frogs occur in the carrs, and great spotted woodpeckers and red-backed shrike may also be seen there. Dragonflies and damselflies thrive greatly on the brown water ponds; a total of 37 different species have been identified in the valley, including the blue hawker. Other insects living in the valley include the stag beetle, der swallowtail and the large marsh grasshopper.

== Geology ==
Geologically the valley is characterised by depositions of bunter sandstone, which is overlain in places by marsh from the Cenozoic. Occasionally, black peat occurs here.

== Tourism ==
Through the Moosbach valley run several walks, such as the Water Lily Tour (Seerosentour). A campsite at the Neudahner Weiher offers the opportunity to camp in the middle of the Palatine Forest. The valley has recently been opened up by the establishment of the eponymous railway halt of Moosbachtal on the Wieslauter Railway. The stop is served by passenger excursion trains on Wednesdays as well as at weekends and on public holidays from May to October.

== See also ==
- List of rivers of Rhineland-Palatinate
