= Bride and Groom (rock formation) =

Rock pinnacles in Dahn, Germany

Coordinates: 49°8′51″N 7°46′26″E

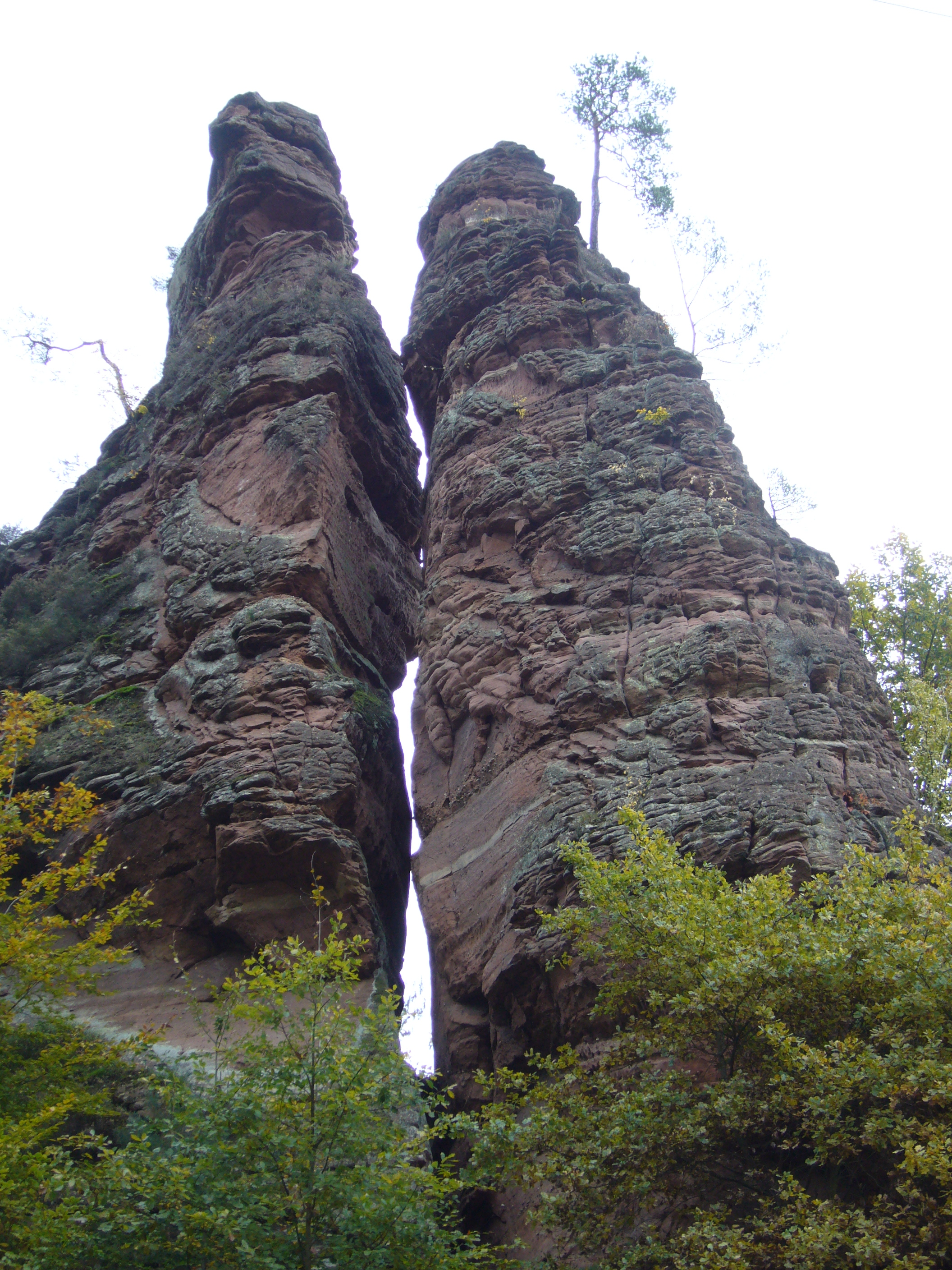
Braut und Bräutigam

The Bride and Groom (German: Braut und Bräutigam) is a double rock pinnacle, about 26 metres (85 ft) high, near the small German town of Dahn in the state of Rhineland-Palatinate and in the southern Palatine Forest, the German half of the Wasgau region.

== Geography ==
The Bride and Groom lie southwest of the town near Dahn Youth Hostel at a height of 232 m above sea level (NN). Opposite them to the northeast, on the other side of the Wieslauter stream, rises the symbol of Dahn, the 70-metre-high Jungfernsprung crag. The surrounding Dahner Felsenland region is particularly rich in such strikingly shaped bunter sandstone rock formations, that have better withstood the weathering and erosion of softer layers of rock.

== Sport climbing ==
In the South Palatinate Climbing Area the Bride and Groom are a much sought-after destination. According to the nomenclature used by sport climbers they are two towers between which there is a chimney, known as the Großer Kamin ("Great Chimney") and which is rated as a medium (III) climbing grade on the UIAA scale. The difficulty of the total of eleven climbing routes on the rocks varies from grades I to VII-.
