= Moosbach (Fichtenberger Rot) =

River in Baden-Württemberg, Germany

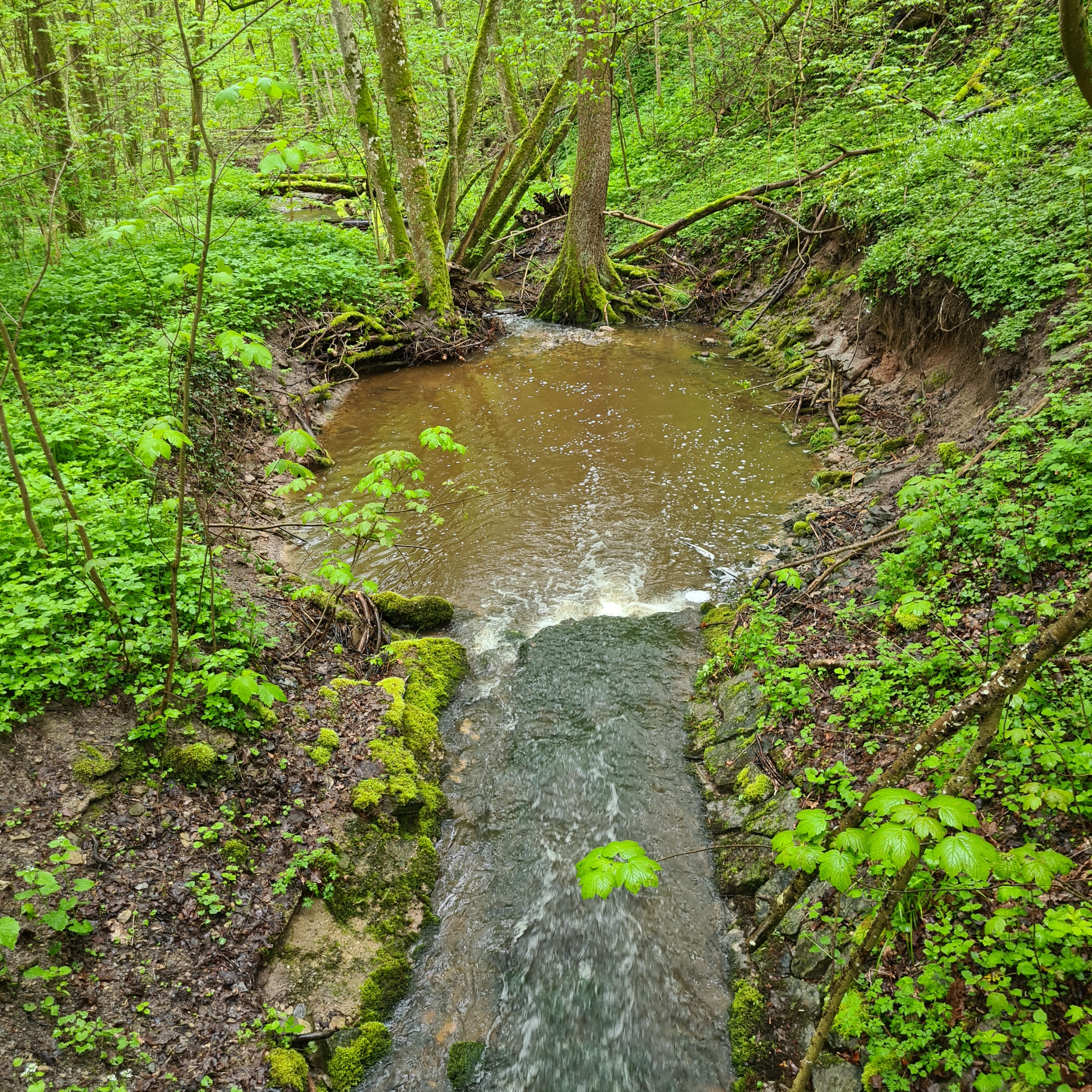
- The Moosbach in the Talwald, slightly after crossing the K 2587 district road.

Location
- Country: Germany
- State: Baden-Württemberg

Physical characteristics
- Source
  - location: Lammsee near Mainhardt
  - coordinates: 49.04207°N 9.55785°E
  - elevation: 486 meters
- Mouth
  - location: Mühlkanal (mill canal) to the Fichtenberger Rot, near Traubenmühle (Mainhardt)
  - coordinates: 49.0566°N 9.5959°E
  - elevation: 395 meters
- Length: 4.0 kilometers
- Basin size: 4.9 km²

Basin features
- Progression: Fichtenberger Rot → Kocher → Neckar → Rhine
- Tributaries
  - left: Krebsbächle

The Moosbach is a river of Baden-Württemberg, Germany, located in the district of Schwäbisch Hall. It is a left tributary of the Fichtenberger Rot. The lower course of the river is known as the Sägmühlebach.

== Course ==
The Moosbach originates at an elevation of 486 m (1,594 ft) from the outflow of the Lammsee, located just a few steps from the B 14 federal road in the main settlement area of Mainhardt. Initially, it flows in a straightened course through a flat meadow hollow in an east-southeasterly direction.

After about 0.5 km, it crosses a field path that follows the route of the former Upper Germanic-Rhaetian Limes. The river then turns slightly to the southeast and flows between two forest areas. It soon enters a more pronounced valley and is accompanied by forest on at least one side. After about 1.5 km, it flows through the 0.8 ha Töbelsee. Continuing its course, it passes the Württemberger Hof farmstead and is crossed by the K 2587 district road. Below this point, the valley deepens, and the river is now called the Sägmühlebach.

Its longest continuously water-bearing tributary, the Krebsbächle, joins from the left. After a total length of 4.0 km, the Sägmühlebach reaches the valley of the Fichtenberger Rot at an elevation of 395 m (1,296 ft). It flows into the left-side mill canal of the Traubenmühle (a district of Mainhardt), which immediately returns to the Fichtenberger Rot about a hundred meters further downstream.

== Geography ==
The Moosbach has a 4.9 km² drainage basin, which lies entirely within the Mainhardt Forest and, more specifically, the Hinterer Mainhardter Wald (Rear Mainhardt Forest) natural region of the Swabian-Franconian Forest. The highest point in the basin is approximately 499 m (1,637 ft) above sea level, located at the northern watershed near a water tower south of the Mainhardt district of Stock.

The river and its entire drainage basin are located within the municipality of Mainhardt, predominantly in the district of Hütten, with only the extreme northwest lying in the main district of Mainhardt.

== See also ==
- List of rivers of Baden-Württemberg
