= Lehnsmann =

A Lehnsmann (plural: Lehnsleute or Lehnsmänner) or Lehnsnehmer (also spelt Lehens-) was a nobleman in the Middle Ages in German-speaking countries, who, as a liegeman was obliged to render service, goods in kind and loyalty to another nobleman, his liege lord (Lehnsherr), in return for which he was rewarded either by a grant of land (a fief or Lehen), which included the population living within it, or by receiving an office. A distinction was made between the gift (which was only valid for the lifetime of the liegeman) and the inheritable fee.

The economic circumstances of the Lehnsleute varied greatly, but as the territorial states developed in the late Middle Ages, their fighting duties were supplanted by the creation of mercenary armies and their role in governing estates was increasingly taken over by trained, non-aristocratic administrators. The life of a Lehnsmann in the early 16th century was described by Ulrich von Hutten (1488–1523) in a letter to Willibald Pirckheimer (1470–1530):

"The people from whom we earn our livelihood, are very poor farmers, to whom we lease our lands, vineyards, meadows and fields. The return from them is very low for the amount of effort involved, but the farmers look after them and toil away to produce as large a return as possible, because we have to be extremely prudent economically. We also serve a prince, from whom we hope for protection; I do not provide that, so everyone thinks he can get away with anything and everything against me. In addition, for the prince's liegeman, this hope [of protection] is combined every day with danger and fear. For if I put just one foot out of the house, there is the risk that I will come across people with whom the prince has had disputes and feuds, and that they will attack me and take me away as a prisoner. If I am unlucky, I could lose half my possessions to pay the ransom and so the protection I am supposed to enjoy would turn out to be quite the opposite."

"We therefore keep horses and buy ourselves weapons, and surround ourselves with a large retinue, all of which costs a great deal of money. We cannot leave even two acres of land unguarded for very long, we must not visit a farm without being armed, and, when hunting and fishing, we have to wear armour. The quarrels between foreign farmers and our own never cease, no day goes by without reports of quarreling and strife, that we try to settle with the utmost care."

"For if I defend myself or pursue wrongs too vigorously, there are feuds. But if I am a little too patient or even give up what is due to me, I am encouraging unjust attacks against me from all sides, because whatever I abandon to one person, is immediately seized upon by all as a reward for their injustice."

"No matter whether a castle stands on a hill or on the plains, it is definitely not built for comfort, but for defence, surrounded by moats and ramparts, inside oppressively small, packed with livestock and stables, its dark chambers crammed with heavy rifles, pitch, sulphur and all other kinds of weapons and warlike equipment. Everywhere, there is the whiff of gunpowder; and the smell of dogs and their muck is not sweet, I think."

Horsemen come and go, including robbers, thieves and highwaymen, because our houses are usually open to all sorts of people, and we do not know the individual particularly well or do not especially look after him. And what a noise! Sheep bleating, oxen bellowing, dogs barking, workers in the field shouting, wagons and carts creaking, and, at home, we can even hear the wolves howling. Every day you worry about the next, you're always on the go, always anxious.

Von Hutten not only gives descriptions of the feudal system, but also numerous criticisms of medieval nobility, clergy, and academics. Eventually, some elements of the dissatisfied knighthood rose up in arms under Franz von Sickingen (1481-1523) and Ulrich von Hutten in the so-called Knights' War (1522-1523). It was quickly suppressed. Both von Hutten and von Sickingen supported the reforming priest and theologian, Martin Luther. Sickingen was mortally wounded, fighting against the Archbishopric of Trier. Von Hutten died a year later in Switzerland.

The Imperial Knights council (Reichsritterstand) eventually lost its political importance. But the feudal system was not officially abolished until 1848. Von Hutten and von Sickingen are both honoured with busts in the Valhalla memorial at Donaustauf.

== See also ==
- Vassal
