= Three castles of Husseren-les-Châteaux =

French castles

Coordinates: 48°02′19″N 07°16′22″E

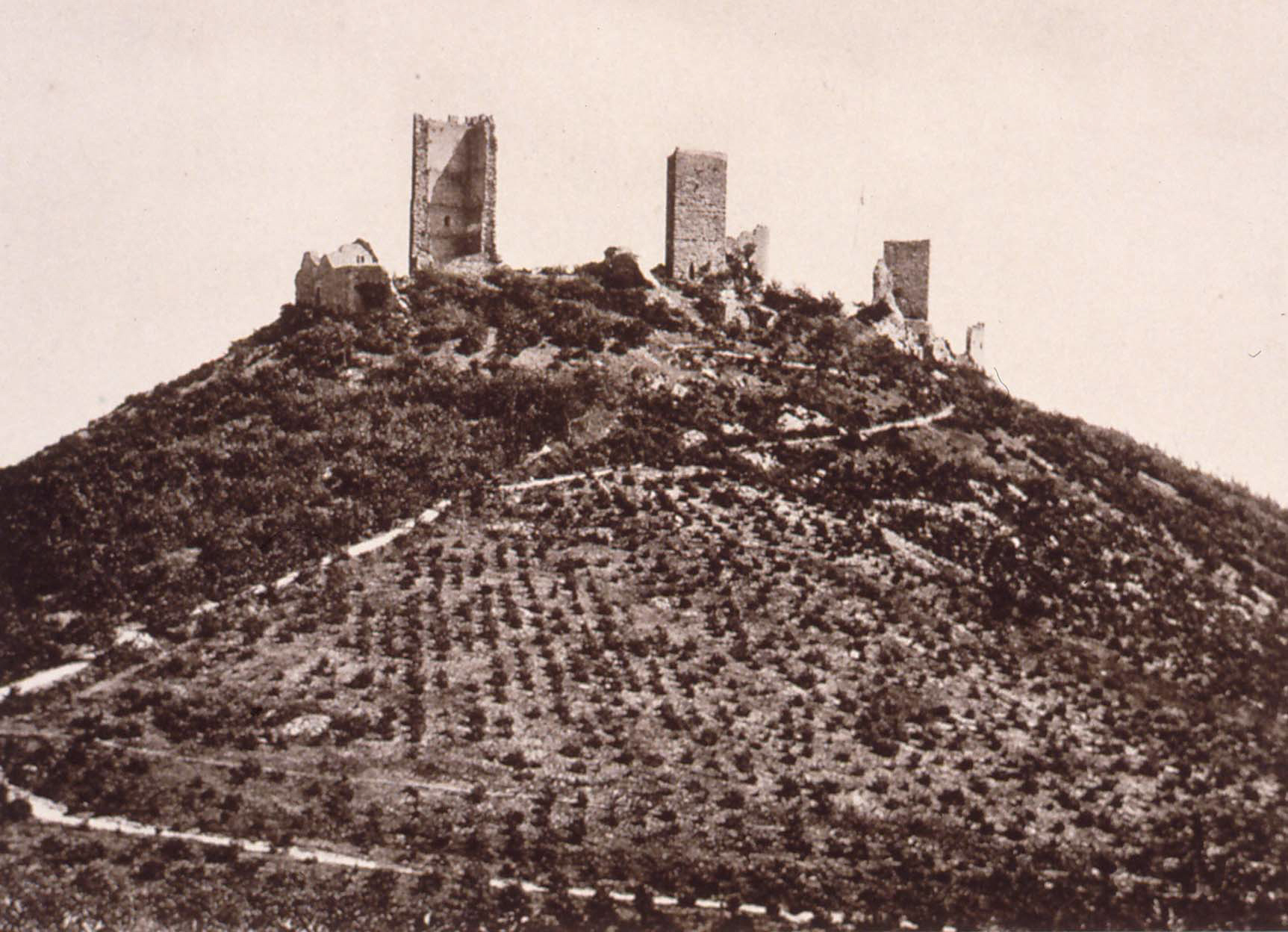
The three castles of Husseren-les-Châteaux in a 1900 photograph

The three castles of Husseren-les-Châteaux (German: Drei Exen or Hoh-Egisheim, French: Haut-Eguisheim or Les Trois Châteaux d’Eguisheim), alternatively referred to as the three castles of Eguisheim, stand in the French Vosges in upper Alsace in the department of Haut-Rhin. The group of castles is variously named after the nearby town of Eguisheim, or the village of Husseren-les-Châteaux.

The three castles – from north to south called the Dagsburg, the Wahlenburg and Weckmund Castle – were built close to one another, but not at the same time, on a low hill ridge. This type of arrangement, with a cluster of three castles, is found in several places in the Vosges and the nearby Palatine Forest in Germany, for example the Dreistein on the Odilienberg, the cluster of castles at Ochsenstein near Saverne, the Hohkönigsburg and the castles at Dahn.

== Literature ==
- Fritz Bouchholtz (Jan 1984), Burgen und Schlösser im Elsaß (in German), Weidlich, ISBN 978-3-8035-8024-5
