= Dahner Felsenland =

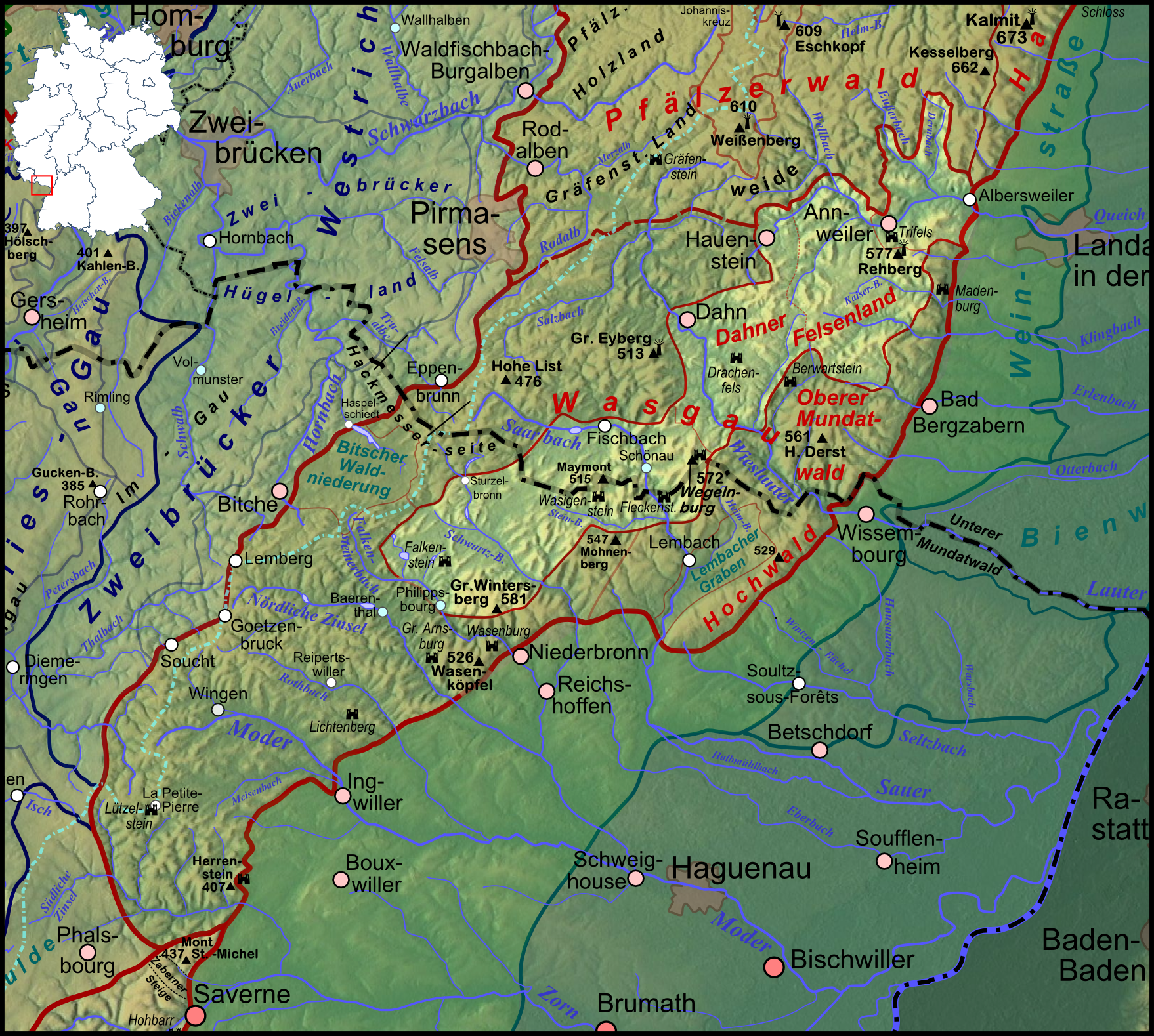
Dahn-Annweiler Felsenland (orange) within the Palatine Forest

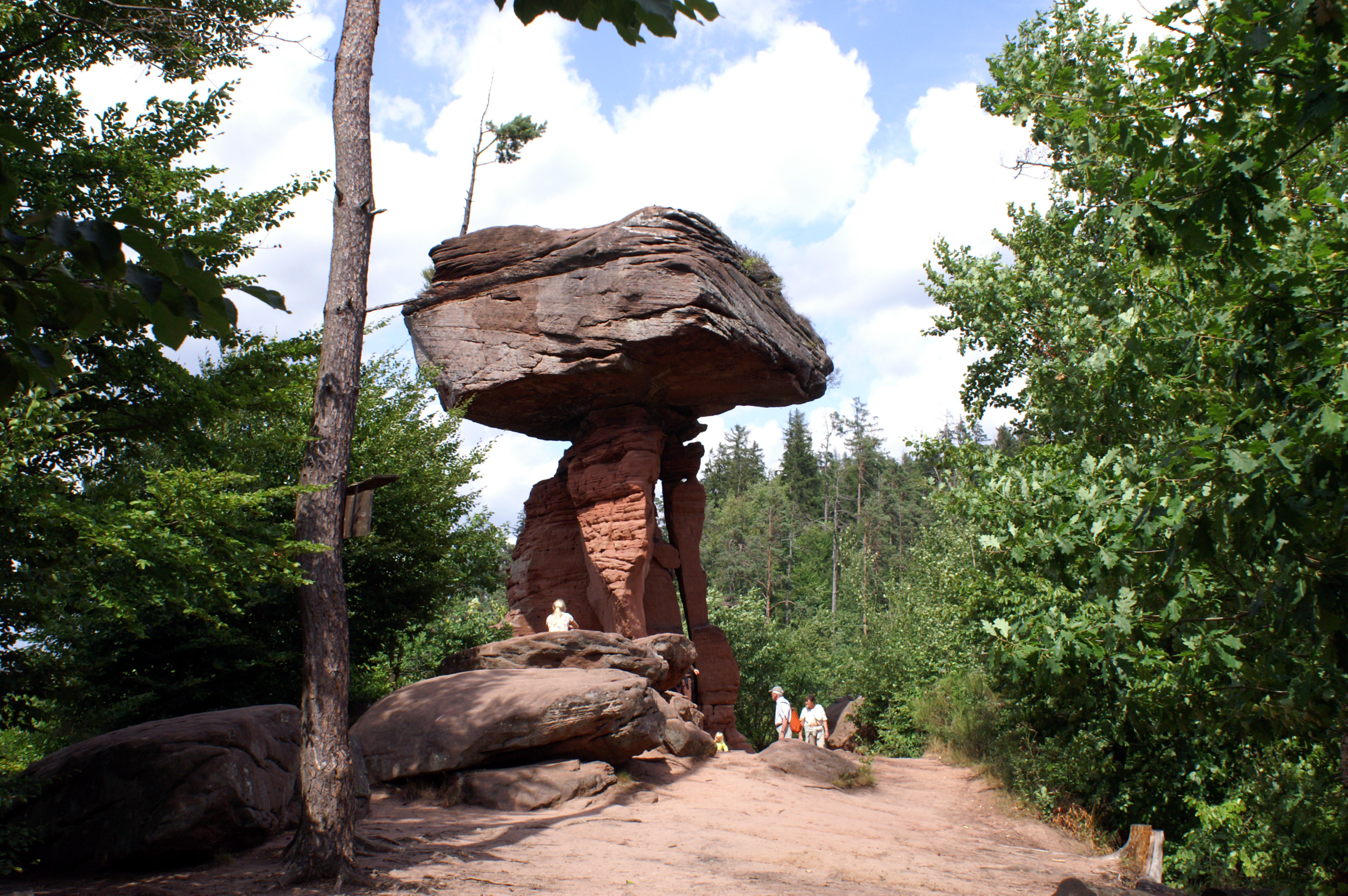
Teufelstisch

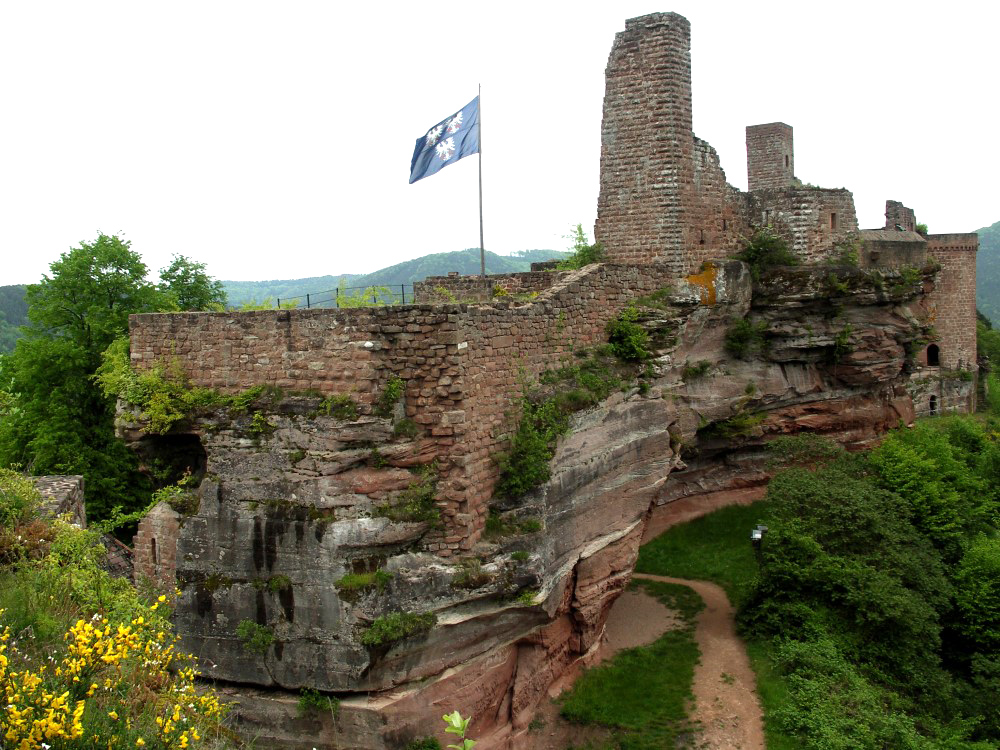
Dahn castle group

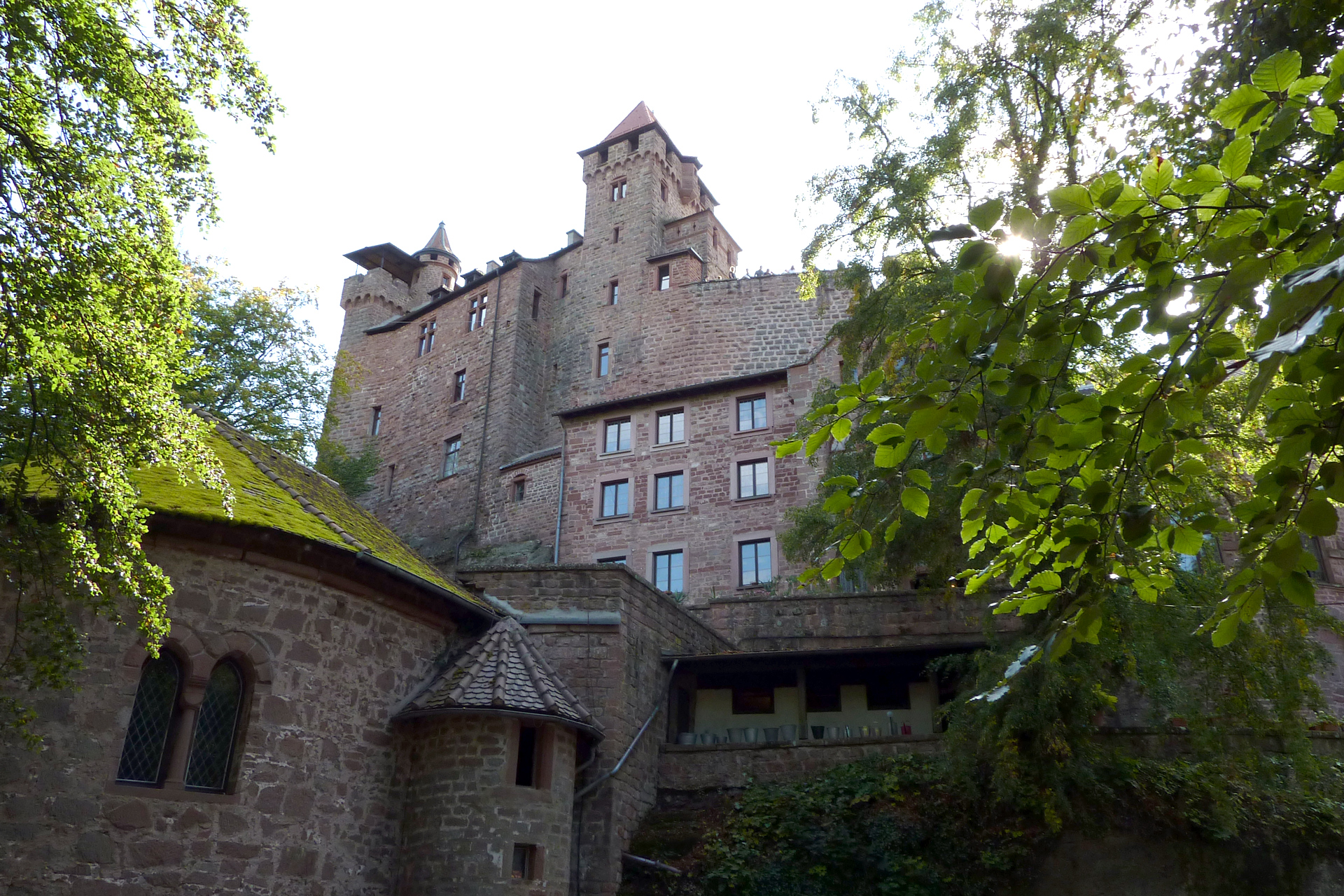
Berwartstein Castle

The Dahner Felsenland, also referred to as the Dahn Rockland, is a landscape in the county of Südwestpfalz in the German federal state of Rhineland-Palatinate. It is located in the middle section of the Wasgau, which in turn forms the southern part of the Palatine Forest and the northern part of the Vosges in France. The Dahner Felsenland has numerous rock formations within the South Palatinate Climbing Area (Klettergebiet Südpfalz).

== Geographic location ==
The landscape covers almost the same area as the collective municipality of the same name, which incorporates the town of Dahn and 14 villages. The Dahner Felsenland is part of the Palatine Forest Nature Park. It lies between 200 m (valleys) and 400 m (hilltops) high and is drained by the Lauter, which here in its upper reaches is called the Wieslauter, into the River Rhine.

== Tourism ==
The region has been opened up by a large number of waymarked walking routes. In Dahn itself is the Felsenland Youth Hostel which is part of the German Youth Hostel Association.

=== Sights ===
In the Dahner Felsenland there are 16 medieval castles or castle ruins as well as numerous rock formations made of bunter sandstone, that are used by sport climbers. Old legends surround rocks like the Jungfernsprung or the Devil's Table (Teufelstisch) (see the Legend of the Jungfernsprung and Legend of the Devil’s Table). Amongst the castles, the Dahn castles, the Berwartstein and the Drachenfels are the best known.

=== Transport ===
The Dahner Felsenland may be reached via the A8 motorway (from the west) and A 65 motorway (from the east), in each case using the B 10 federal highway that links the two autobahns. The B 427 (from Hinterweidenthal to Bad Bergzabern) runs right through the Dahn Valley (Dahner Tal), the originally planned section of the A 8 motorway from Pirmasens to Karlsruhe, running past Dahn, was never realised.

Running parallel to the B 427 in places is a branch of the Queich Valley Railway (Pirmasens–Landau), the Wieslauter Railway that links the villages of Hinterweidenthal in the north and Bundenthal in the south of the Dahner Felsenland. The route was re-opened in 1997 for excursions on Sundays and holidays, after regular passenger services had been terminated in 1966.
