= Dahn (disambiguation) =

Dahn is a municipality in the Südwestpfalz District (South-West Palatinate), in Rhineland-Palatinate, Germany.

Dahn may also refer to:

- Dahn (surname)
- Dahn Ben-Amotz (1924–1989), Israeli radio broadcaster
- Dahn yoga
- Castles of Dahn, Germany
- Erlenbach bei Dahn, Germany
- Fischbach bei Dahn, Germany
- House of Dahn, noble house in Germany
