= Biosphere House =

Museum in Rhineland-Palatinate

Coordinates: 49°5′13.59″N 7°43′30.2″E

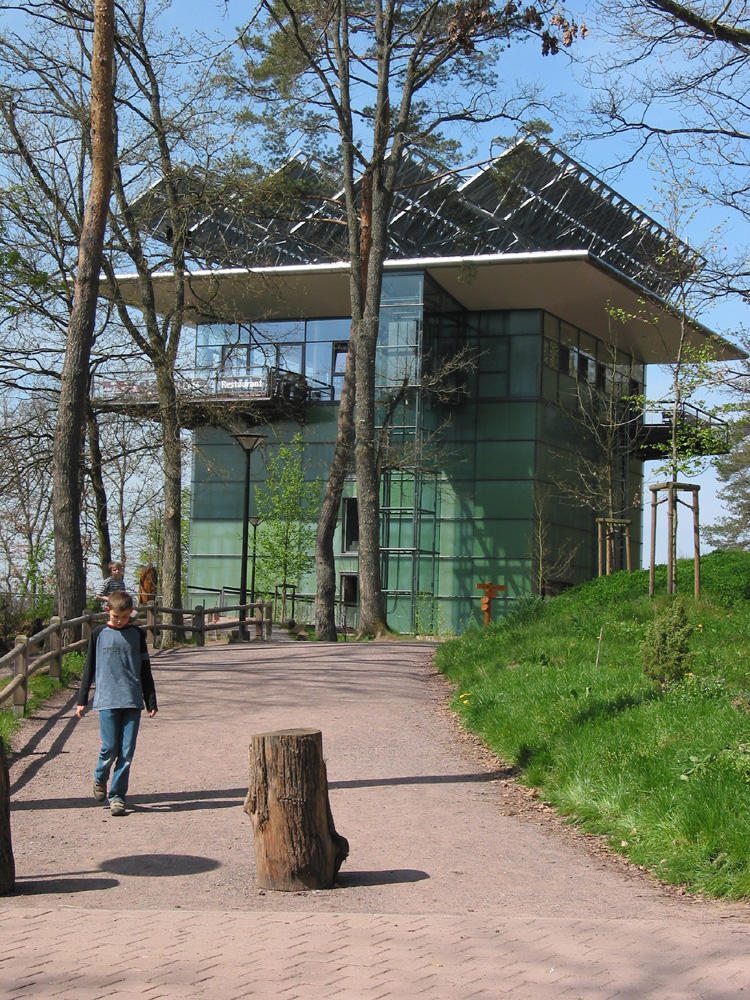
Fischbach Biosphere House

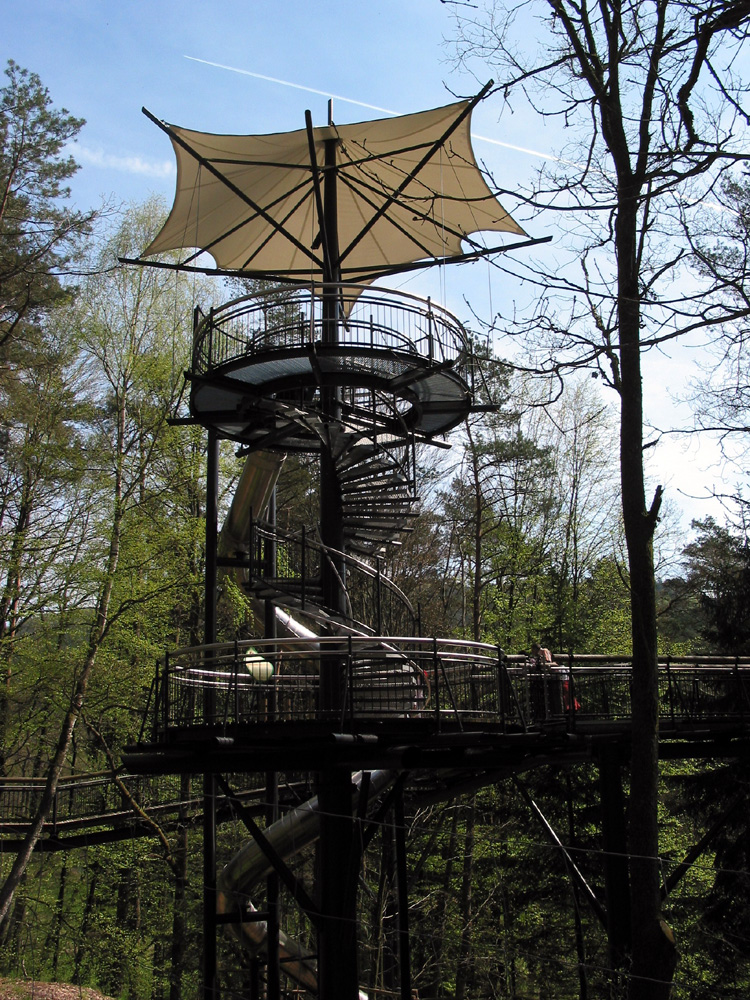
Treetop Path

The Biosphere House (German: Biosphärenhaus) in the village of Fischbach bei Dahn in the German state of Rhineland-Pfalz is a nature experience centre and important regional tourist attraction.

== Location ==
Fischbach lies in the southern part of the Palatine Forest, the German part of the Wasgau region, near the Franco-German border and in the heart of the cross-border Palatinate Forest-North Vosges Biosphere Reserve. The Biosphere House and its grounds are on the eastern edge of the municipality on the water meadows of the Saarbach stream.

== Development and structure ==
The Biosphere House was set up as a decentralised project of the world exposition Expo 2000 in Hanover. The project is based on the modular principle and is continually being developed:

Originally the Biosphere House was a single-storey building that opened in March 2000 as an information centre for the biosphere reserve. An important part of the centre is a multi-faceted multimedia exhibition.

In March 2002, two years after its opening, the nature experience centre (Naturerlebniszentrum) was added. This consists of an exhibition room with adjacent accommodation and a restaurant, as well as an interactive circular path. This is 1,500 metres long and has 14 way stations with interesting information about the region; it is also pram- and wheelchair-friendly. The nature experience centre is frequently used by school classes.

In June 2003 a treetop walkway was opened with a length of 270 metres and running through the treetops of the Palatine Forest over suspension bridges and plate bridges (Tellerbrücke). The aerial high point and finish is an "eagle's nest", 35 metres high, from where there are good views over the biosphere reserve. To return to the ground there is a 45 metre long slide. In its first 3 years 467,000 people experienced the walkway.

The Water Experience Path (Wasser-Erlebnis-Weg) was opened in 2006. The ca. 2 kilometre long route along the Saarbach comprises 14 stations, at which various aspects of water are presented, e.g. hydropower, water creatures and water quality. Also in 2006 the second floor of the main building of the Biosphere House was opened with an exhibition with an interactive history on the subject of waterbodies and stream valleys (Gewässer und Bachtäler).

== Economics ==
Because visitor numbers were much higher than the original prognosis, the Biosphere House can fund its own routine operations and only resorts to state subsidies for its larger projects. About 45 employees – 15 permanent and 30 seasonal – work at the Biosphere House.
