= Drachenfels Castle (Wasgau) =

- Busenberg
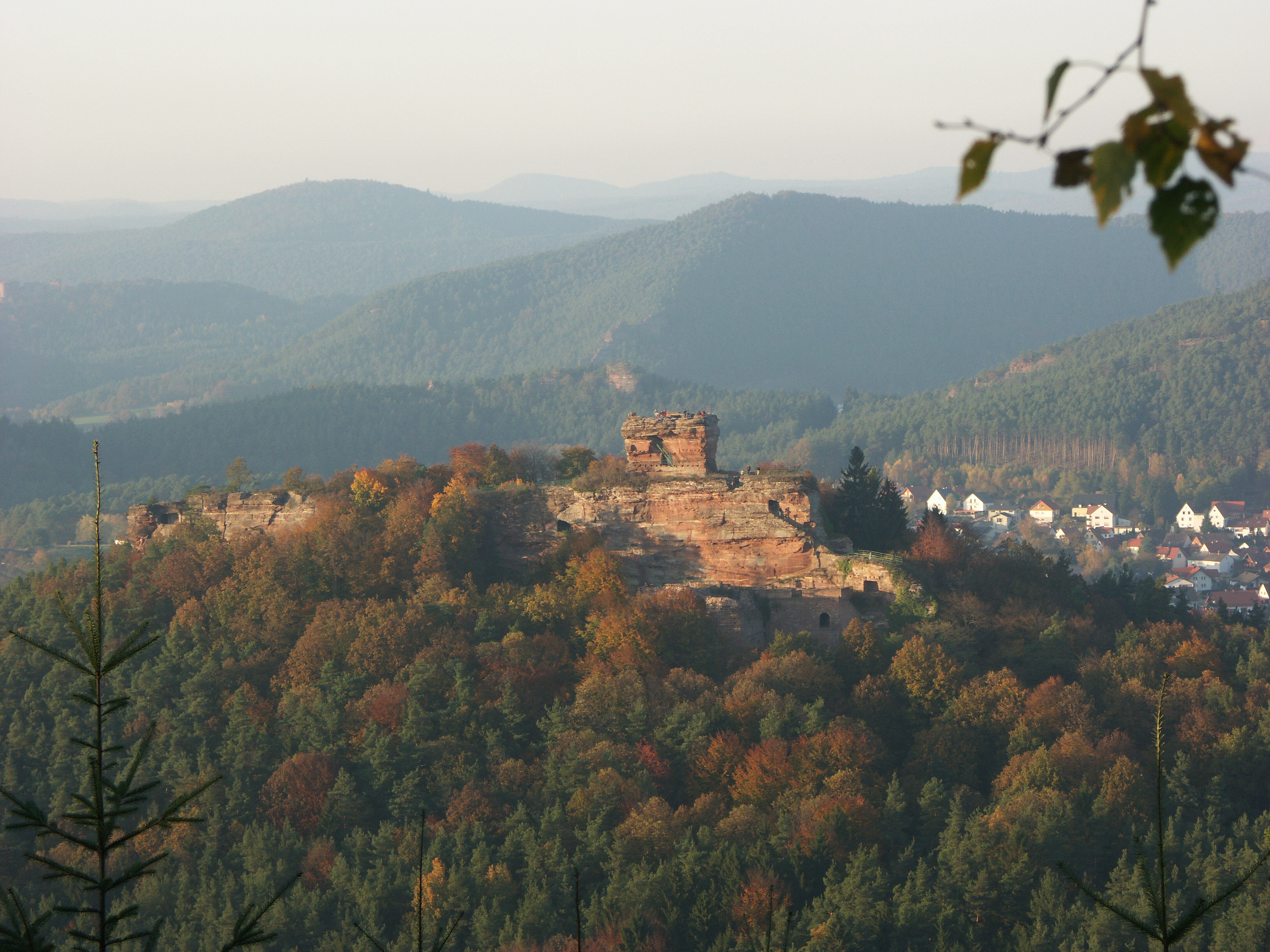
- Ruins of Drachenfels Castle

Site information
- Type: hill castle on a rock formation
- Code: DE-RP
- Condition: ruin

Location
- Coordinates: 49°07′19″N 7°49′41″E
- Height: 368 m above sea level (NN)

Site history
- Built: Early 12th century
- Materials: rusticated ashlar

Garrison information
- Occupants: Ganerbenburg (joint inheritance)

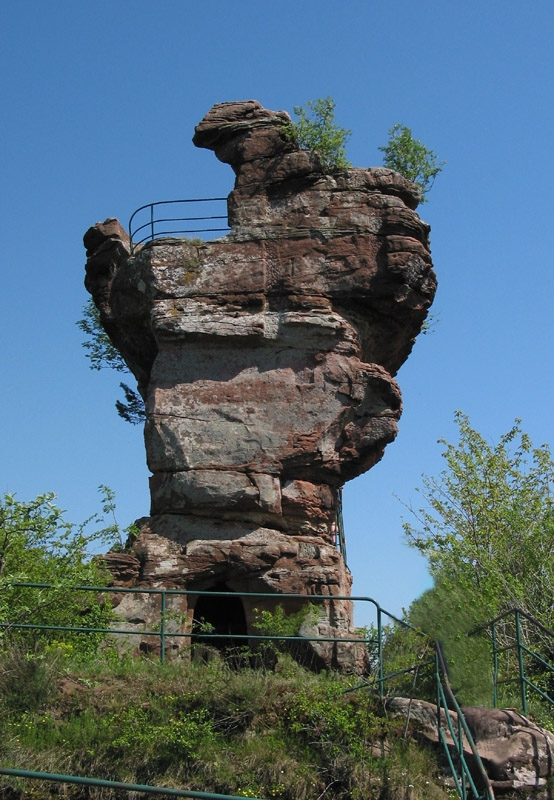
The tower of Drachenfels Castle, the "molar" (Backenzahn)

Drachenfels Castle is a ruined hill castle near the village of Busenberg in the state of Rhineland-Palatinate. It lies within the German half of the Wasgau region, the southern part of the Palatinate Forest.

== Location ==
Drachenfels Castle is about 7 kilometres (4 mi) north of the Franco-German border on the eponymous 150-metre-long bunter sandstone rocks which are on a ridge at an elevation of 368 metres (1,207 ft) above sea level. The highest part of the rocks was turned into a keep or bergfried. Because of its present appearances the remains of the tower are known as the Backenzahn ("molar tooth") by the locals and make it one of the most striking castles in Rhineland-Palatinate.

Not far from the Drachenfels are several other historic castles: just 3 kilometres (2 mi) to the south-east is Berwartstein; a similar distance to the north-west are the three castles of Dahn; Lindelbrunn is 6 kilometres (4 mi) northeast and the group of castles on the Franco-German border - the Wegelnburg (German) and the Hohnebourg, Lœwenstein and Fleckenstein (all on the French side) - are 10 kilometres (6 mi) to the southwest.

Man-made chambers have been hewn out of a rock massif opposite the castle, the so-called Buchkammerfels, which lies on the Heidenberg, 420 metres (1,380 ft) high. The date and function of these Heidenkammern are unknown: it is speculated it may have been an outpost of the Drachenfels.

== Name and history ==
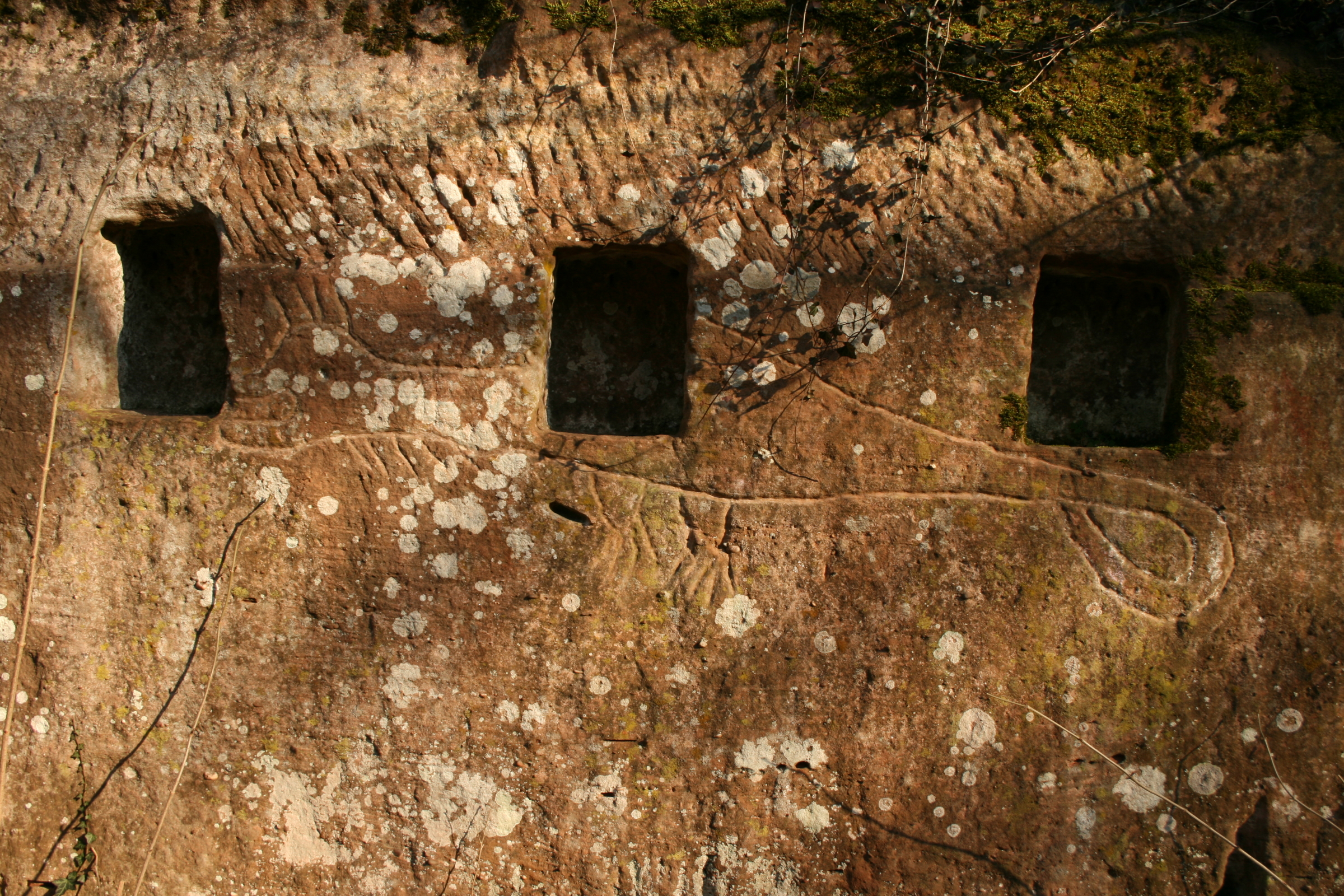
The dragon inscribed on the wall of the old castle hall

The name of the castle could have come from the dragon carved in the sandstone wall of the old great hall of the castle. However, because it has not been dated it is also possible that the dragon was inscribed on the wall because of the castle's name.

The origins of the castle are largely unclear. Archaeological finds here can be dated to the mid-13th century, but the castle was already in existence in the early 12th century. In 1209 the brothers Conrad and William of Drachenfels were first mentioned in the records. Historian, Johann Lehmann (1797–1876), named a Burkhard of Drachenfels between 1219 and 1221 who was in service for the House of Hohenstaufen, but he gave no references. Other documents confirm that in 1288 a dispute was settled between the cousins Rudolph and Anselm of Drachenfels, and the Bishop of Worms. The oldest surviving seal of these two cousins depicts a dragon in a pointed shield (Spitzschild). From the early 14th century the seal contained a deer's skull or a wild goose. The first lesser nobleman who it is known with any certainty had a connexion with this castle in the Wasgau is Walter of Drachenfels (also Waltherus de Drachenvels) in 1245.

In 1314 the lords of Drachenfels were promised compensation payments for a campaign by the city of Strasbourg against Berwartstein Castle, during which the nearby castle at Drachenfels was also besieged and damaged. In 1335 there was a conflict with Strasbourg in which the lords of Drachensfels were accused of being robber barons. At this time Drachenfels was besieged and partially destroyed, forcing its lords to gradually sell off parts of the castle from 1344. As a result Drachenfels became a jointly owned castle or Ganerbenburg, whereby several families or individuals divided the estate between themselves.

In 1510 the rebellious imperial knight, Francis of Sickingen, also bought a share in the castle. On 10 May 1523, after his defeat by the allied armies of three imperial princes, the castle was finally destroyed, although the Burgvogt who occupied it with just eight servants had surrendered without a fight owing to the odds that he was faced with. The victors refused to allow the castle to be rebuilt.

What was left of the castle after it had been slighted was used as a quarry. In 1778 a descendant of its owners, Freiherr Franz Christoph Eckbrecht von Dürkheim, built a manor house in the village of Busenberg with the stones from Drachenfels, which is known today as the Schlösschen ("little palace"). The church in Busenberg was also built from stones from the ruined castle.

== Description ==
=== Eastern castle rocks and older lower ward ===
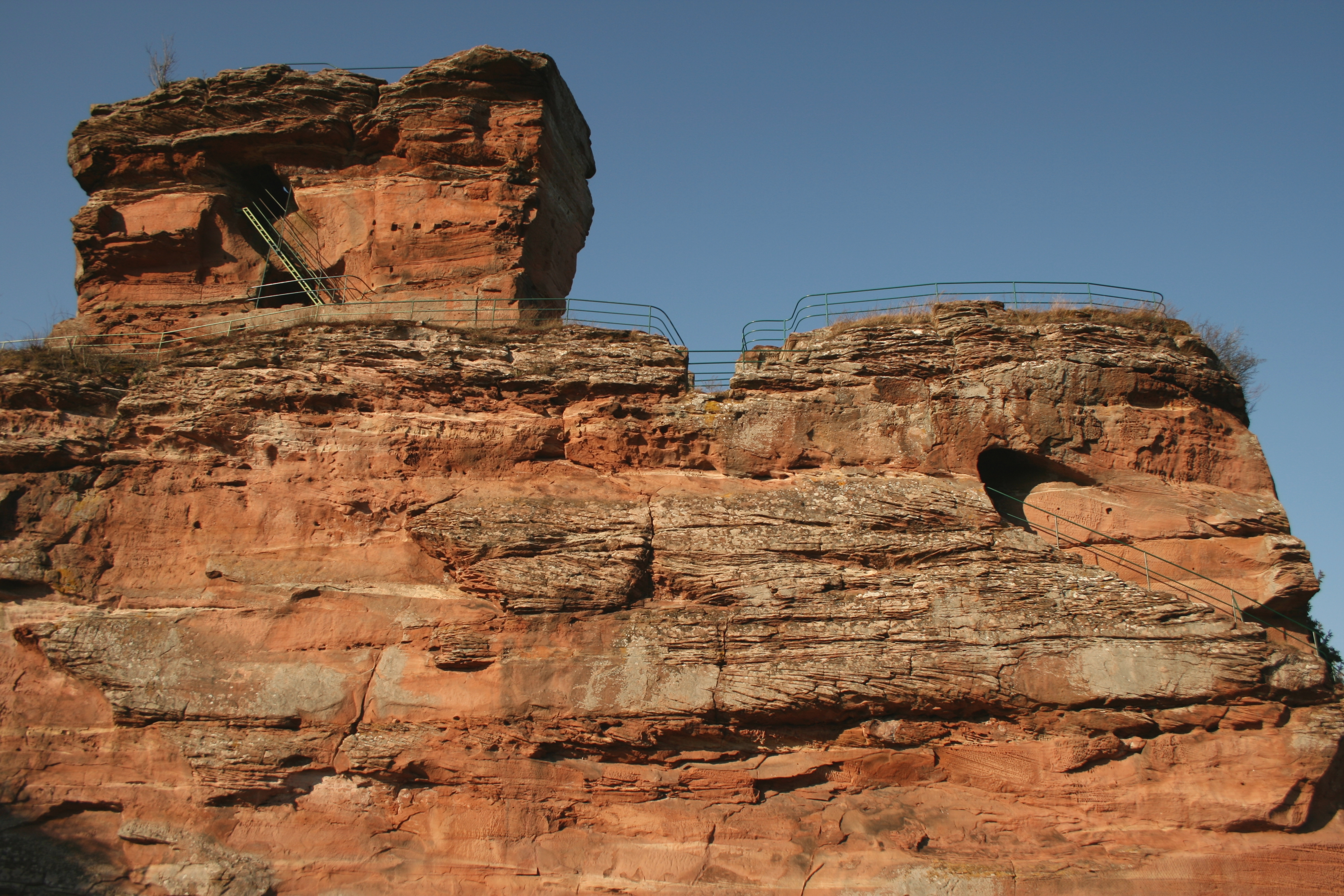
Eastern castle rock from the south with putlocks and other man-made marks

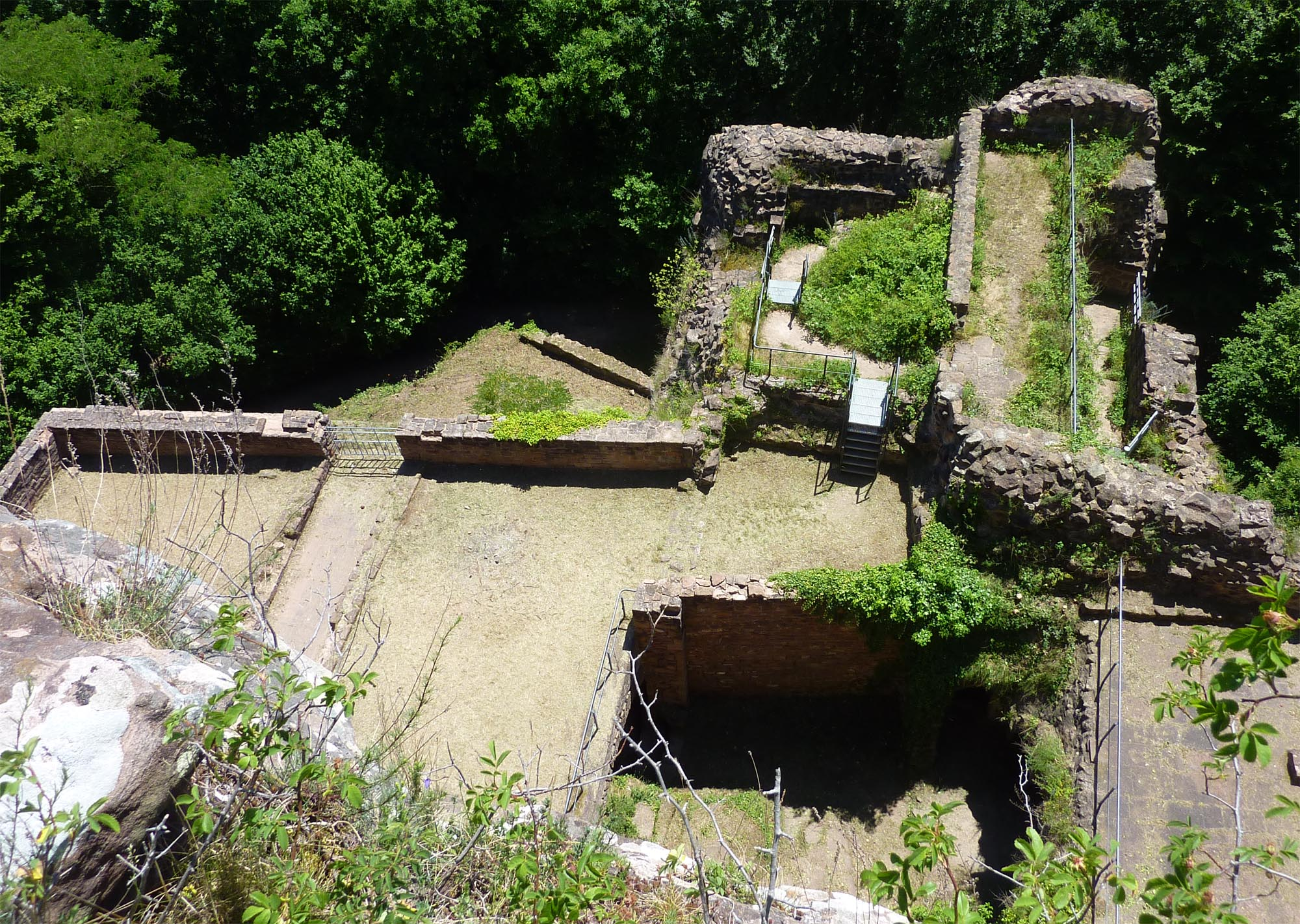
Eastern lower ward

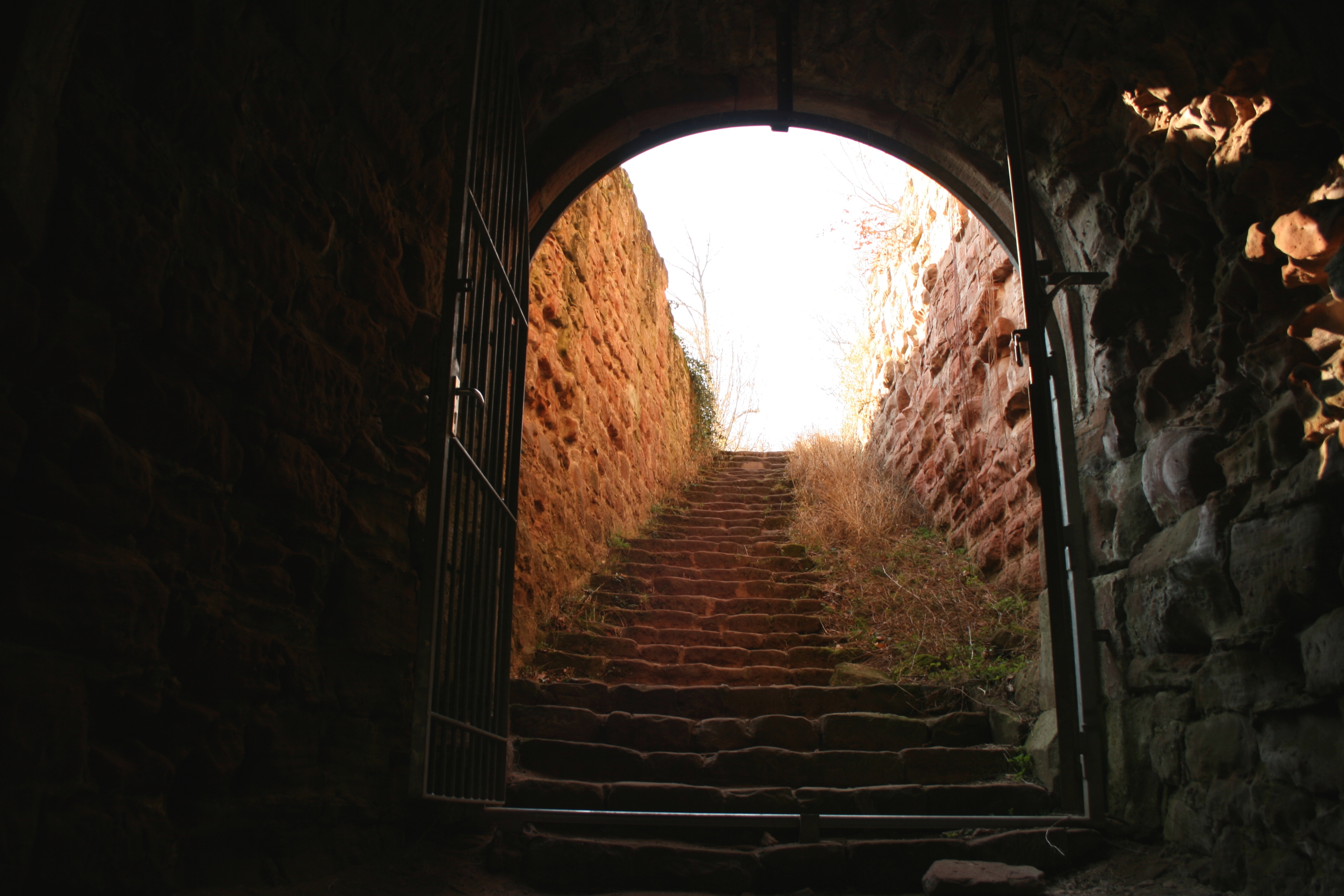
Climb to the outer ward from the more recent gate tower

The moderate remains of the castle in the eastern part of the site are dominated by the so-called Backenzahn, the castle rock in the east. On the rock only a few original wall courses have survived. All the same, a climb up the steps partially carved into the rock conveys an idea of the strength of the fortification. On the plateau of the former bergfried are the remains of a cistern. In the rooms hewn out of the rock, putlock holes and other manmade marks chiselled into the sandstone indicated that it was once entirely covered by timber framed or stone buildings.

Considerably more has survived of the lower ward and gate system. In 1903, the gate tower was enhanced by two round-arched portals. Since 1990, the remains of two other towers, a small outer bailey as well as walls and buildings have been the focus of conservation and excavation activities by the "Directorate General for Cultural Heritage in Rhineland-Palatinate".

The visitor first enters the tower, which admittedly was added later, but is made throughout of rusticated ashlars with lifting holes on which numerous stone marks can be seen. Access to the upper ward was achieved through an older tower built against the rock. Today there is a staircase between the two gate towers, originally there was probably an equestrian staircase here. In the courtyard of the lower ward, two outbuildings have partly survived. At the basement entrance of the western building, the year 1515 can be seen. In the basement of the other building is the castle well, now filled in.

=== Western castle rock and later lower ward ===
In the castle's later years the somewhat lower western rock was built on. The reason for such extensions is usually a change in ownership of castles, such as conversion of the original fief into a joint inheritance or Ganerbschaft. However, no walls can be seen on the western rock, and it is not even accessible. Elements of the ascent and a guardroom on the south side of the rock have survived.

The site on the western rock had a separate, small, lower ward and its own gate system southeast of the castle rock, of which the remains of a flanking tower with embrasures has survived. In building the castle on the western rock, a multi-storey building was built over the old moat. Of this, only the putlock holes have survived, several of which pierce the old image of a dragon carved into the rock. To the north the courtyard was enclosed by a semicircular wall.
