= Drachenfels Castle =

Drachenfels Castle (German: dragon's rock castle) is the name of the following German castle ruins:

- Drachenfels Castle (Siebengebirge), on the Rhine between Königswinter and Bad Honnef, Nordrhein-Westfalen
- Drachenfels Castle (Wasgau), near Busenberg im Wasgau in the south of the Palatinate Forest, Rhineland-Palatinate
