= Dahn (surname) =

Dahn is German surname, and may refer to:

- Alvin Dahn (born 1948), American musician
- Bernice Dahn (born 1965), Liberian politician
- Craig Dahn (born 1964), American pianist
- Daniela Dahn (born 1949), German writer
- Felix Dahn (1834–1912), German lawyer and writer
- Jeff Dahn (born 1957), Canadian battery researcher
- Nancy Dahn (born 1968), Canadian violinist

== See also ==
- Dahn
