= Erfweiler =

- Municipality
- Coat of arms

- Location of Erfweiler within Südwestpfalz district
- Interactive map of Erfweiler
- Location within Germany Location within Rhineland-Palatinate
- Coordinates: 49°09′24″N 7°48′39″E
- Country: Germany
- State: Rhineland-Palatinate
- District: Südwestpfalz
- Municipal assoc.: Dahner Felsenland

Government
  - Mayor (2019–24): Walter Schwartz (CDU)

Area
  - Total: 8.84 km^{2} (3.41 sq mi)
- Elevation: 224 m (735 ft)

Population (2025-12-31)
  - Total: 1,089
  - Density: 123/km^{2} (319/sq mi)
- Time zone: UTC+01:00 (CET)
  - Summer (DST): UTC+02:00 (CEST)
- Postal codes: 66996
- Dialling codes: 06391
- Vehicle registration: PS
- Website: www.erfweiler.de

Erfweiler (German pronunciation: [ˈɛʁfvaɪlɐ]) is a municipality in Südwestpfalz district, in Rhineland-Palatinate, western Germany. It is a state-recognised resort.

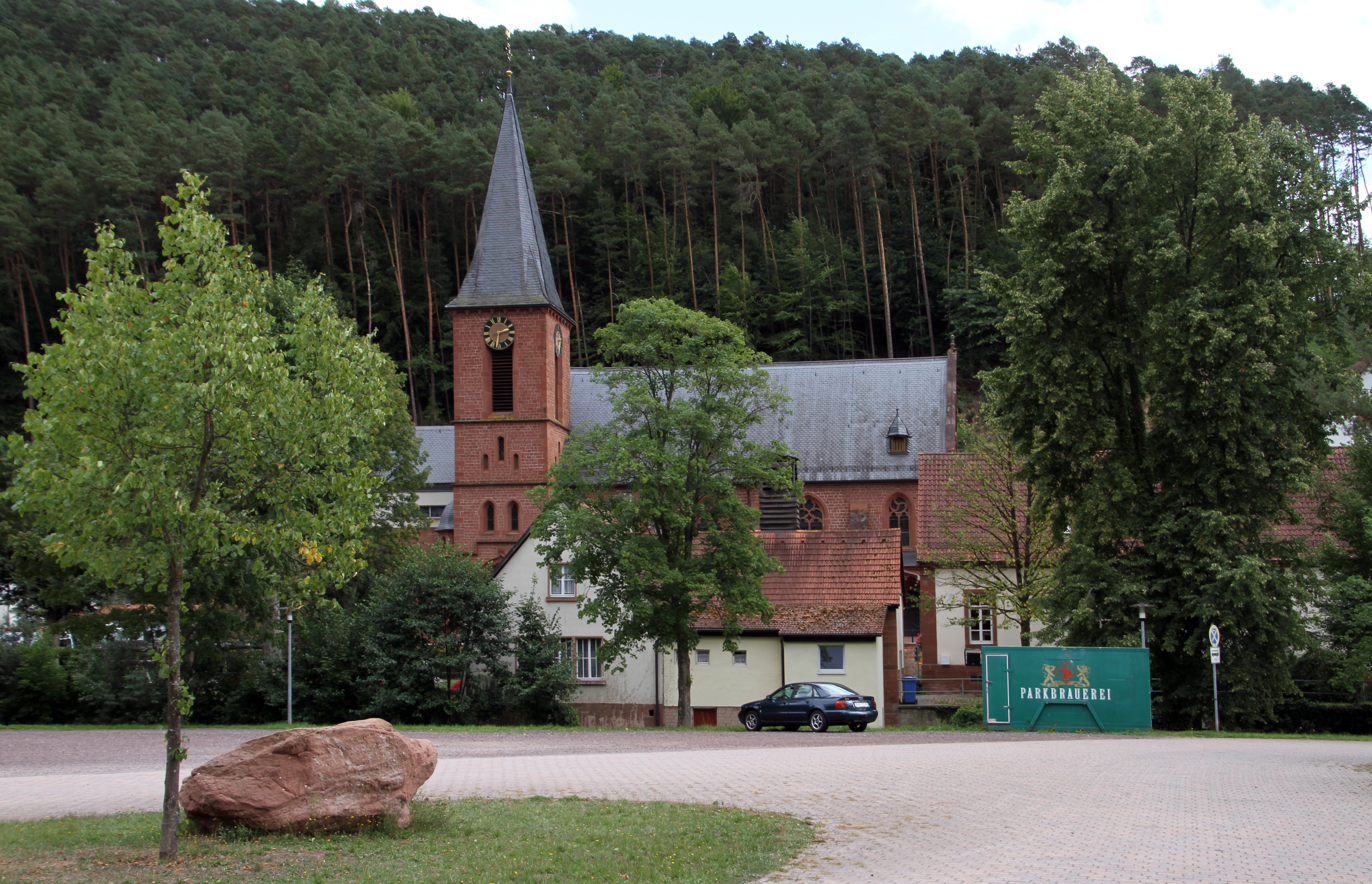
St. Wolfgang

== Geography ==
=== Location ===
Erfweiler lies in the German part of the Wasgau, as the southern end of the Palatine Forest and northern part of the Vosges are also called, and belongs to the natural regional of the Dahn Rockland. 82.5% of the parish is forested. Its neighbouring communities in clockwise order are Hauenstein, Schwanheim, Busenberg, Schindhard and Dahn.

=== High points ===
In the east, at the tripoint with Schwanheim and Busenberg is the Wolfshorn, 476.7 m above NHN, and, to the southwest on the boundary with Busenberg is the Eichelberg. On the boundary with Hauenstein is the Mitel-Schachen and the Winterberg (460.8 m above NHN) and, to the west of that, is the Trögenberg (323.2 m above NHN) and the Wölmersberg further south. On the boundary with Schindhard is the Kahlenberg (399 m above NHN) and on the boundary with Dahn, the Schlossberg (323.1 m above NHN).

== Culture ==
=== Cultural monuments ===
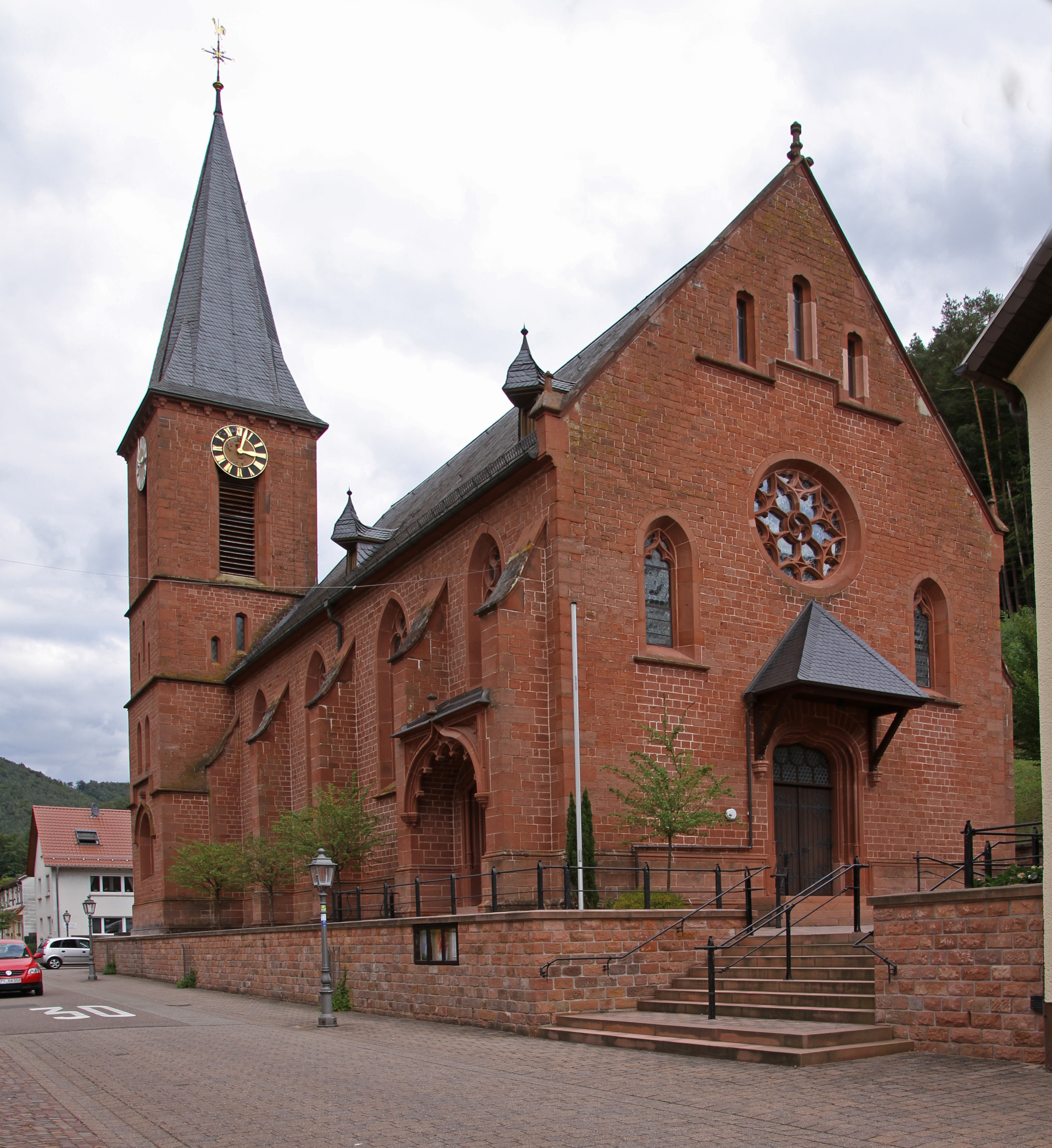
The listed Church of St. Wolfgang

In the municipality there are a total of 29 objects that are under monument protection, including the 'Winter Church'.

=== Nature ===
The municipality is located in the Palatine Forest Nature Park, which in turn belongs to the Palatinate Forest-North Vosges Biosphere Reserve. In Erfweiler district there are also around a dozen rock formations that are classified as natural monuments, including the Hegerturm. The place is part of the Palatine Forest Climbing Area.

At the boundary of Hauenstein was once a 300-year-old oak, popularly known as the 'Fat Oak' (Dicke Eiche). After becoming a victim of vandalism in 1994, it she was cut down in 2011. It is the namesake for the Dicke Eiche hiking home, which was on the Hauenstein side.

=== Sport and leisure ===
Erfweiler is home to an unusual descendant of the traditional card game of German Schafkopf, known as Bauernstoss.
