= Conrad IV (disambiguation) =

Conrad IV of Germany (1228–1254) was King of Germany (King of the Romans) from 1237 to 1254.

Conrad IV or Konrad IV may also refer to:

- Conrad IV of Frontenhausen, bishop of Regensburg (1204–1226)
- Conrad IV of Tann (died 1236), German Roman Catholic bishop
- Conrad IV of Swabia or Conradin (1252–1268)
- Conrad IV of Fohnsdorf, archbishop of Salzburg (1291–1312)
- Conrad IV(died 1324), bishop of Cammin
- Conrad IV of Schöneck, bishop of Worms (1319–1329)
- Conrad IV of Weinsberg, fought in the Reichskrieg (1311–1312)
- Conrad IV of Hanau (died 1383), abbot of Fulda
- Conrad IV, Count of Rietberg (c. 1371–1428)
- Konrad IV the Elder (c. 1384–1447), Duke of Silesia
- Conrad IV (1408–1419), Count of Fürstenberg-Wolfach
- Conrad IV of Bussnang (died 1471), French Roman Catholic bishop
