= Heidenberg =

Heidenberg is the name of the following hills and passes in Germany:

- Heidenberg (Wasgauer Felsenland) (419.6m), hill near Busenberg in the Wasgau, Palatinate Forest, Rhineland-Palatinate
- Heidenberg (Siegen) (309.7m), hill in the borough of Siegen, North Rhine-Westphalia
- Heidenberg (Roth) (461.4m), hill, hilly wooded region and unincorporated area near Kammerstein, Bavaria
- Heidenberg (Odenwald) (460.7m), hill pass in the Odenwald, near Schloßau (Mudau), Baden-Württemberg
