= Ludwig Kneiss =

German opera singer

- Born: 11 November 1830; Bundenthal
- Died: 25 April 1900 (aged 69); Munich
- Occupations: singer, stage actor

Ludwig Kneiss (born in Bundenthal, 11 November 1830 – died in Munich, 25 April 1900) was a German bass, baritone, and tenor singer and stage actor.

== Career ==
Kneiss played on several Austrian stages from 1853 to 1863, in 1864 at the Munich Hoftheater (Munich court theatre), and for a short time in Ulm, before he got his actor's training by Adolf Christen at the Münchner Aktientheater from 1865 to 1867.

In the subsequent years, he was engaged by theatres in several German cities and in Amsterdam. In 1872, he went back to Munich, where he played at the Gärtnerplatztheater. One of his roles was "Grattabugia", the innkeeper in Carl Zeller's operetta Die Fornarina. Later he worked as secretary in the direction of the Gärtnerplatztheater and as librarian.
