= Hirschthal, Germany =

Hirschthal
- Municipality
- Coat of arms

- Location of Hirschthal within Südwestpfalz district
- Interactive map of Hirschthal
- Location within Germany Location within Rhineland-Palatinate
- Coordinates: 49°2′56″N 7°45′22″E
- Country: Germany
- State: Rhineland-Palatinate
- District: Südwestpfalz
- Municipal assoc.: Dahner Felsenland

Government
  - Mayor (2019–24): Yvonne Darsch

Area
  - Total: 1.58 km^{2} (0.61 sq mi)
- Elevation: 206 m (676 ft)

Population (2025-12-31)
  - Total: 80
  - Density: 51/km^{2} (130/sq mi)
- Time zone: UTC+01:00 (CET)
  - Summer (DST): UTC+02:00 (CEST)
- Postal codes: 66996
- Dialling codes: 06393
- Vehicle registration: PS
- Website: dahner-felsenland.net

Hirschthal (German pronunciation: [ˈhɪʁʃtaːl]) is a municipality in Südwestpfalz district, in Rhineland-Palatinate, western Germany.
