= Dahner Felsenland (Verbandsgemeinde) =

- Verbandsgemeinde
- Location of Dahner Felsenland within Südwestpfalz district
- Interactive map of Dahner Felsenland
- Location within Germany Location within Rhineland-Palatinate
- Coordinates: 49°09′N 7°47′E
- Country: Germany
- State: Rhineland-Palatinate
- District: Südwestpfalz
- Seat: Dahn
- Subdivisions: 15 municipalities

Area
  - Total: 215.61 km^{2} (83.25 sq mi)

Population (2025-12-31)
  - Total: 13,427
  - Density: 62.274/km^{2} (161.29/sq mi)
- Time zone: UTC+01:00 (CET)
  - Summer (DST): UTC+02:00 (CEST)
- Website: www.dahner-felsenland.de

Dahner Felsenland is a Verbandsgemeinde ("collective municipality") in the Südwestpfalz district, in Rhineland-Palatinate, Germany. It is situated in the Palatinate Forest, approx. 15 km southeast of Pirmasens, and 25 km west of Landau. Its seat of administration is in its central town, Dahn. The area is known for its red sandstone cliffs, many of them crowned with ruined castles.

== Municipalities ==
The Verbandsgemeinde Dahner Felsenland consists of the following Ortsgemeinden ("local municipalities"):

1. Bobenthal
2. Bruchweiler-Bärenbach
3. Bundenthal
4. Busenberg
5. Dahn
6. Erfweiler
7. Erlenbach bei Dahn
8. Fischbach bei Dahn
9. Hirschthal
10. Ludwigswinkel
11. Niederschlettenbach
12. Nothweiler
13. Rumbach
14. Schindhard
15. Schönau
