= Nothweiler =

- Municipality
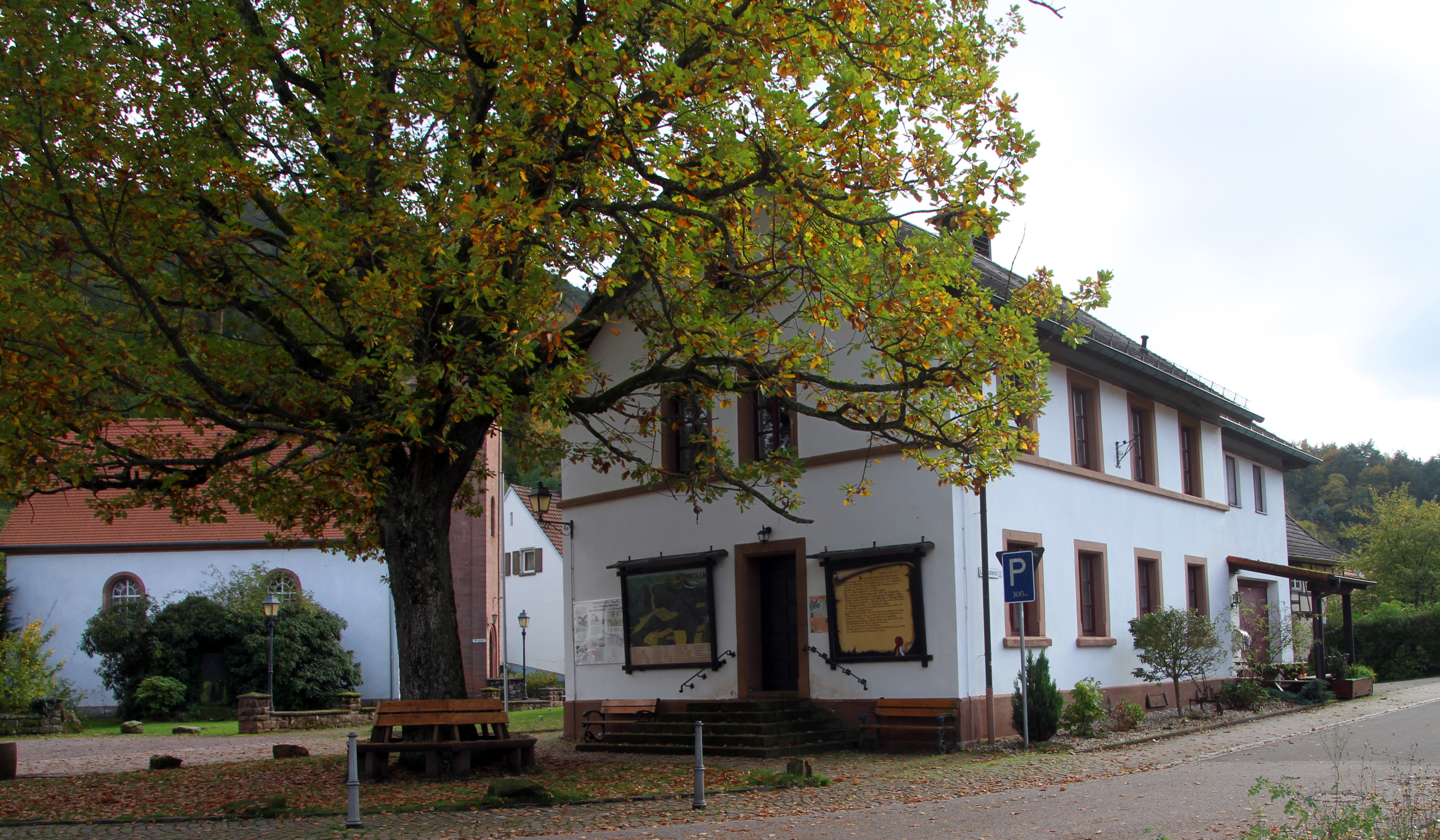

- Coat of arms

- Location of Nothweiler within Südwestpfalz district
- Interactive map of Nothweiler
- Location within Germany Location within Rhineland-Palatinate
- Coordinates: 49°4′7.37″N 7°47′56.83″E
- Country: Germany
- State: Rhineland-Palatinate
- District: Südwestpfalz
- Municipal assoc.: Dahner Felsenland

Government
  - Mayor (2019–24): Nicole Grüny

Area
  - Total: 3.68 km^{2} (1.42 sq mi)
- Elevation: 268 m (879 ft)

Population (2025-12-31)
  - Total: 127
  - Density: 34.5/km^{2} (89.4/sq mi)
- Time zone: UTC+01:00 (CET)
  - Summer (DST): UTC+02:00 (CEST)
- Postal codes: 76891
- Dialling codes: 06394
- Vehicle registration: PS
- Website: www.nothweiler.de

Nothweiler is a municipality in Südwestpfalz district, in Rhineland-Palatinate, western Germany. The mayor is Nicole Grüny. As of December 2020 the population was 132. It is situated 268 metres above sea level and has an area of 3.68 km^{2} (1.42 sq mi).
