= Heidenberg (Wasgau Felsenland) =

Coordinates: 49°6′56″N 7°50′9″E

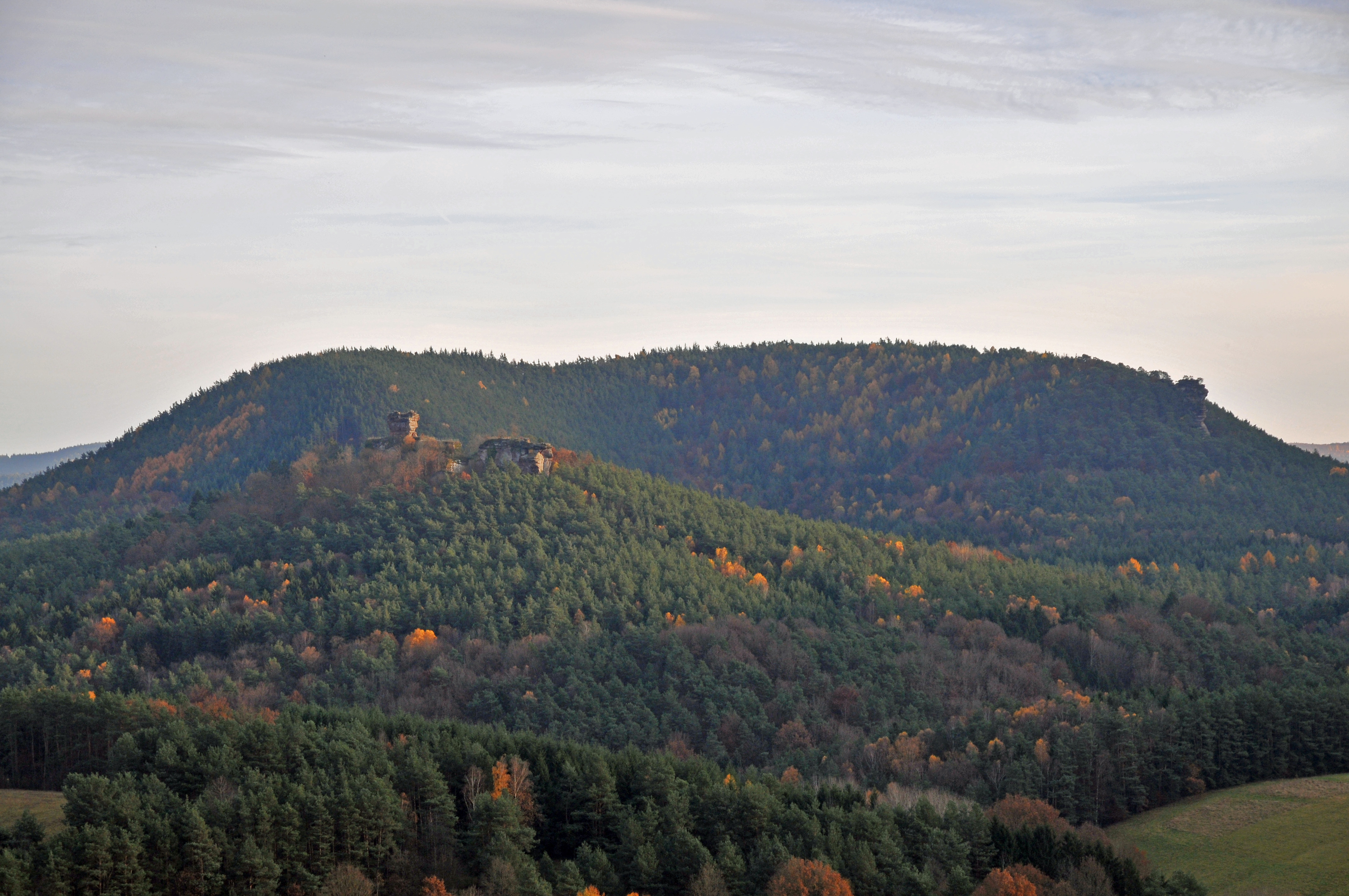
View from the Sprinzel (Dickenbergpfeiler): in the foreground the ruins of Drachenfels; behind the northwestern flank of the Heidenberg; right: the Buchkammerfels rocks.

The Heidenberg is a 420-metre-high hill in the southeastern Wasgau, the region that covers the southern part of the Palatinate Forest in Germany and the northern Vosges in France. The Heidenberg's north flank is in the parish of Busenberg, its south flank in the parish of Erlenbach bei Dahn.

On its western slopes is the Buchkammerfels, a striking rock formation in which, in a rock spur with vertical sides, there is what is suspected to be the site of a castle that consisted of inaccessible rock chambers (known as Buchkammern or Heidenkammern). The rock chambers are first mentioned in 1635, where they are described as dungeons. This function is just as unverified as the theory that they might have been used by the inhabitants of Drachenfels Castle as an outlying observation post.
