= Bruchweiler-Bärenbach =

- Municipality
- Coat of arms

- Location of Bruchweiler-Bärenbach within Südwestpfalz district
- Interactive map of Bruchweiler-Bärenbach
- Location within Germany Location within Rhineland-Palatinate
- Coordinates: 49°6′48″N 7°48′6″E
- Country: Germany
- State: Rhineland-Palatinate
- District: Südwestpfalz
- Municipal assoc.: Dahner Felsenland

Government
  - Mayor (2019–24): Günter Feyock

Area
  - Total: 9.36 km^{2} (3.61 sq mi)
- Elevation: 265 m (869 ft)

Population (2025-12-31)
  - Total: 1,522
  - Density: 163/km^{2} (421/sq mi)
- Time zone: UTC+01:00 (CET)
  - Summer (DST): UTC+02:00 (CEST)
- Postal codes: 76891
- Dialling codes: 06394
- Vehicle registration: PS
- Website: www.bruchweiler-baerenbach.de

Bruchweiler-Bärenbach is a municipality in Südwestpfalz district, in Rhineland-Palatinate, western Germany.

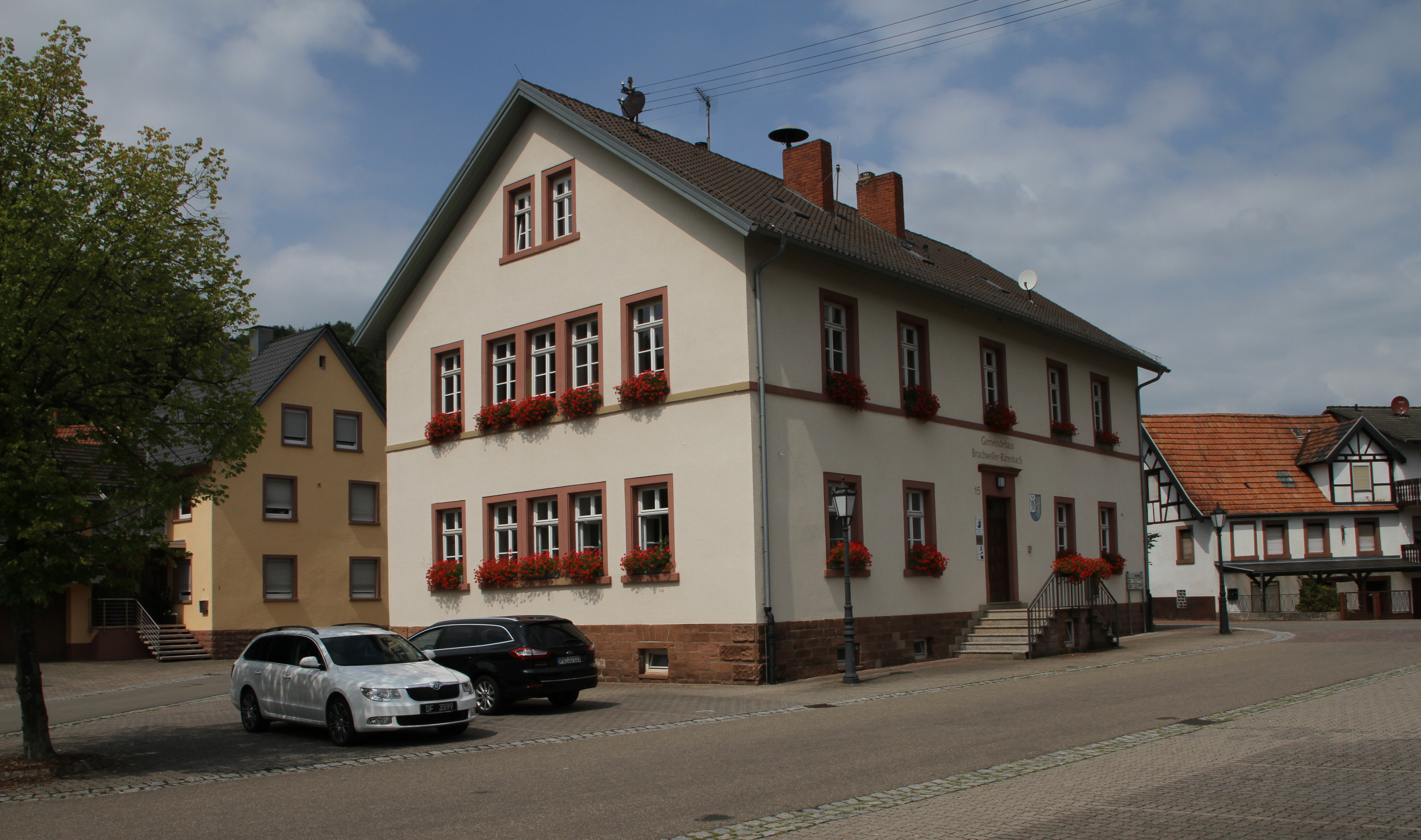
Meeting house
