= Dahn =

- Town
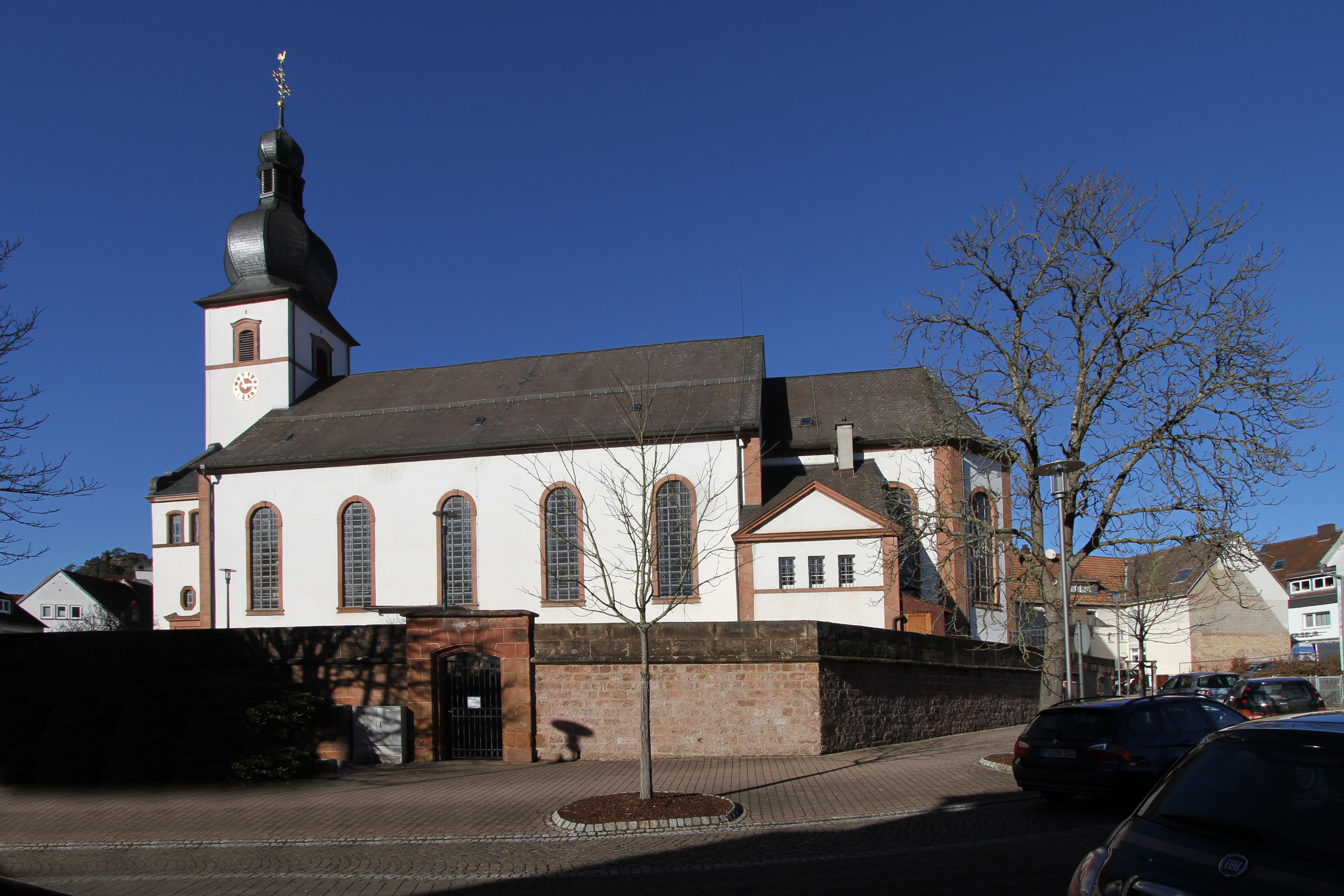
- St. Laurentius

- Coat of arms

- Location of Dahn within Südwestpfalz district
- Interactive map of Dahn
- Location within Germany Location within Rhineland-Palatinate
- Coordinates: 49°9′N 7°47′E
- Country: Germany
- State: Rhineland-Palatinate
- District: Südwestpfalz
- Municipal assoc.: Dahner Felsenland

Government
  - Mayor (2019–24): Holger Zwick

Area
  - Total: 40.76 km^{2} (15.74 sq mi)
- Elevation: 210 m (690 ft)

Population (2025-12-31)
  - Total: 4,250
  - Density: 104/km^{2} (270/sq mi)
- Time zone: UTC+01:00 (CET)
  - Summer (DST): UTC+02:00 (CEST)
- Postal codes: 66994
- Dialling codes: 06391
- Vehicle registration: PS
- Website: www.dahn.de

Dahn (German pronunciation: [daːn]) is a municipality in the Südwestpfalz district, in Rhineland-Palatinate, Germany. It is situated in the Palatinate Forest, approximately 15 km southeast of Pirmasens, and 25 km west of Landau. It is part of the Verbandsgemeinde ("collective municipality") of Dahner Felsenland.

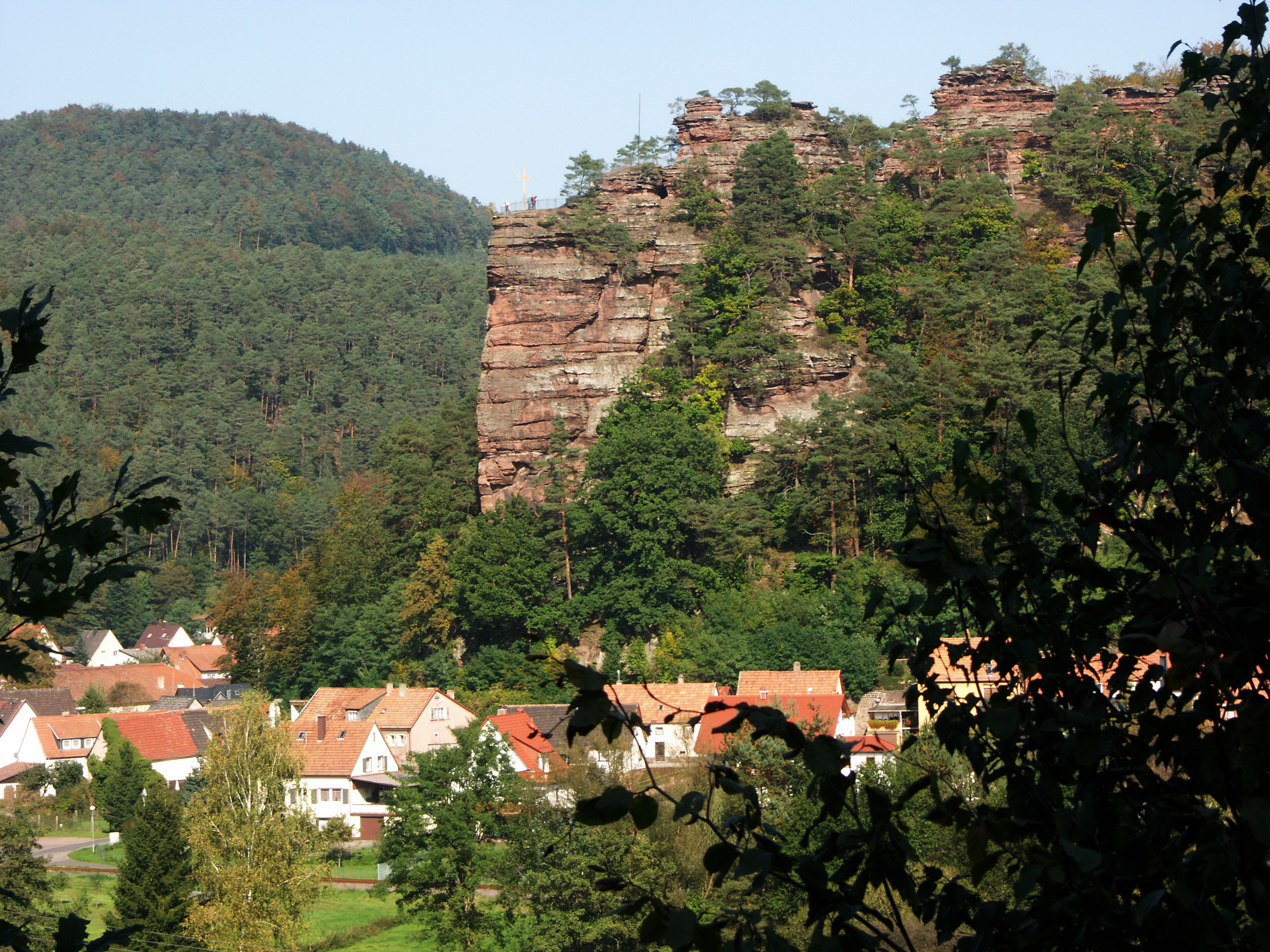
Landmark: The Jungfernsprung rock

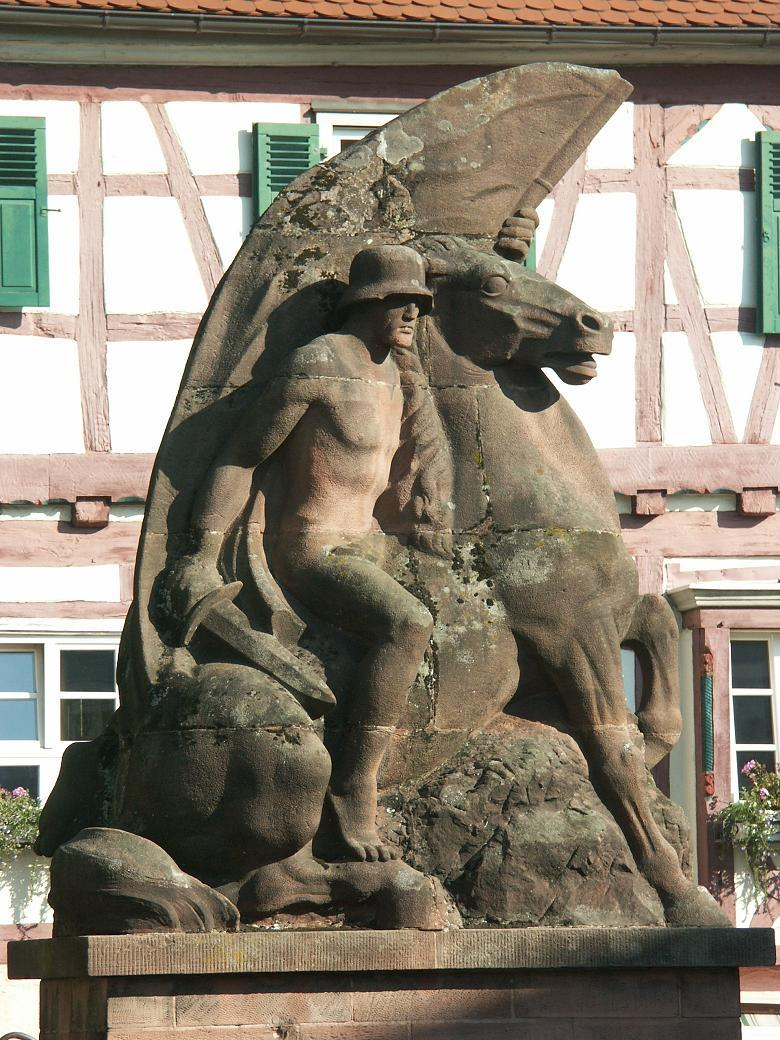
War Memorial for those killed in action in WW I and II

== Geography ==
Dahn is located 210 m above sea level in a valley of the Dahner Felsenland, a part of the Wasgau, which is itself a part of the Palatinate Forest. A small creek, the Lauter, flows through Dahn, and here, in the area of its headwaters, is called the Wieslauter. The border with Alsace (France) is located 10 km south of Dahn.

== History ==
=== Coat of arms ===
In 1952 the coat of arms was recreated as a result of historical research. The new shield, parted per chevron, has on its dexter chief: azure (blue), a cross argent (silver); on its sinister chief: gules (red), an eagle argent (silver) and on its base: or (gold), a fir tree vert (green).

The fir tree (German: Tanne, [assumed to be linked to the name of the town]) was originally the only symbol of Dahn. However, the new coat of arms also commemorates the history of Dahn. The knights of Than, feudatories of the bishop of Speyer, were the lords of Dahn for over four hundred years and may have called themselves after the town; the white eagle with red background is derived from the knight's coat of arms, which showed three white eagles (perhaps the symbol for the three castles of Altdahn, Grafdahn and Tannstein). After the extinction of the House of Than in 1603, Dahn was the head office of a department of the diocese of Speyer until the beginning of the French revolutionary wars in 1797/98. The white cross on blue was adopted from the arms of Speyer (both the diocese and the Prince-Bishopric. The fir tree remains as a reference to the name of the town, which was the old seal of the Court, as well as the scenic location of the city in the Palatinate Forest.

=== Municipal law ===
Dahn received its municipal law on 27 October 1963 after the Land (Federal State) of Rhineland-Palatinate acceded to its application, which had been filed on 24 January 1963.

== Politics ==
Aldermen:
(Elections on 25 May 2014, number of mandates: 20)

	SPD	CDU	FDP	FD	WGK	Summation
2014	6	9	–	3	2	20 Seats
2009	7	8	3	–	2	20 Seats
2004	4	12	1	–	3	20 Seats

- FD = Wählergruppe Für (free voters for) Dahn e. V.
- WGK = Wählergruppe (free voters) Koch

== Culture and sightseeing ==
In the neighbourhood of Dahn are the ruins of a triple castle complex, comprising Altdahn, Grafendahn and Tanstein castles, as well as the castle of Neudahn, which is also a ruin, albeit less spectacular.

South of the town, on the edge of the Hochstein rocks is Dahn Cemetery, a war cemetery for soldiers of the Palatinate and the Alsace who fell during the Ardennes Offensive in the Second World War.

A 70 m tall rock juts above the city and is a famous destination for rock climbers during the summer. Its name Jungfernsprung ("Virgin's Leap"), is derived from an old legend.

Even nowadays the forests and sandstone rocks surrounding Dahn give Lebensraum to the Elwetritsche. In order to honour the relation between inhabitants of Dahn and Elwetritsche there is an Elwetritsche lecture trail, an Elwetritsche hiking trail as well as Elwetritsche fountains, and further memorials.

== Economy and infrastructures ==
=== Economy ===
Dahn, unfortunately, has had to survive without much industry due to the Südwestpfalz district's structural weakness. Because of this the population has declined. Only tourism shows an upwards trend because nature in the surrounding area is largely intact and frequently quite spectacular.

=== Traffic ===
The B 427 federal road (from Hinterweidenthal to Bad Bergzabern) passes through Dahn. The plan for a junction between the road and the A 8 motorway (from Pirmasens to Karlsruhe) which was planned to run past Dahn has never been realised.

Since 1997 the Wieslauter Railway calls at Dahn on Sundays and statutory holidays. It connects Hinterweidenthal and Bundenthal. Regular public train services stopped in 1966.

=== Healthcare ===
The public hospital, St. Josef Krankenhaus, closed at the end of 2005 as a result of funding issues. The Felsenland-Klinik, a psychotheraputic hospital, uses its own specially developed technique of psychoanalytic hypnosis. Dahn also has an outpatient living group of the Pfalzklinikum für Psychiatrie und Neurologie ("Palatinate Hospital For Psychiatrics And Neurology"), which is situated in Klingenmünster.

=== Education ===
The primary school in Dahn serves the municipality of Dahn as well as Schindhard and Erfweiler. The school centre of Dahn is within the commuter belt of a Realschule Plus and the Otfried-von-Weißenburg-Gymnasium of Western-Wasgau. This gymnasium is the only one in the Südwestpfalz administrative district. Dahn also has a special education school (the Ritter-von-Tann-Förderschule). During the years 1958 through 1994 the Catholic Church operated a boarding school, the Studienheim St. Pirmin.

== Personalities ==
=== Sons and daughters of the city of Dahn ===
- Stefan Baron (*1948), trust spokesman of the Deutsche Bundesbank
- Alexander Fuhr (*1969), politician, member of the Landtag of Rhineland-Palatinate (Social Democratic Party of Germany (SPD)), mayor of the city of Dahn
- Theodor Kissel (*1962), historian and author
- Ingbert Naab (1885–1935), Friars Minor Capuchin and resistance fighter against National Socialism, beatified, Pater-Ingbert-Naab-street bears his name
- Theodor Schaller (1900–1993), Theologian and church president

=== Personalities, operated in Dahn ===
- Stephan Eisel (*1955), politician (Christian Democratic Union (CDU)), visited the Otfrid-von-Weißenburg-Gymnasium
- Heiner Geißler (1930–2017), politician (Christian Democratic Union (CDU)), had his office in Dahn
- Fritz Korter (1892–1945), sculptor, creator of the Dahn war memorial
- Friedl Rinder (1905–2001), chess player, winner of the 1959 German Chess Women's Championship, which took place in Dahn
