= Niederschlettenbach =

- Municipality
- Coat of arms

- Location of Niederschlettenbach within Südwestpfalz district
- Interactive map of Niederschlettenbach
- Location within Germany Location within Rhineland-Palatinate
- Coordinates: 49°05′10″N 7°50′42″E
- Country: Germany
- State: Rhineland-Palatinate
- District: Südwestpfalz
- Municipal assoc.: Dahner Felsenland

Government
  - Mayor (2019–24): Thomas Pietsch

Area
  - Total: 7.64 km^{2} (2.95 sq mi)
- Elevation: 203 m (666 ft)

Population (2025-12-31)
  - Total: 264
  - Density: 34.6/km^{2} (89.5/sq mi)
- Time zone: UTC+01:00 (CET)
  - Summer (DST): UTC+02:00 (CEST)
- Postal codes: 76891
- Dialling codes: 06394
- Vehicle registration: PS
- Website: www.niederschlettenbach.de

Niederschlettenbach is a municipality in Südwestpfalz district, in Rhineland-Palatinate, western Germany.

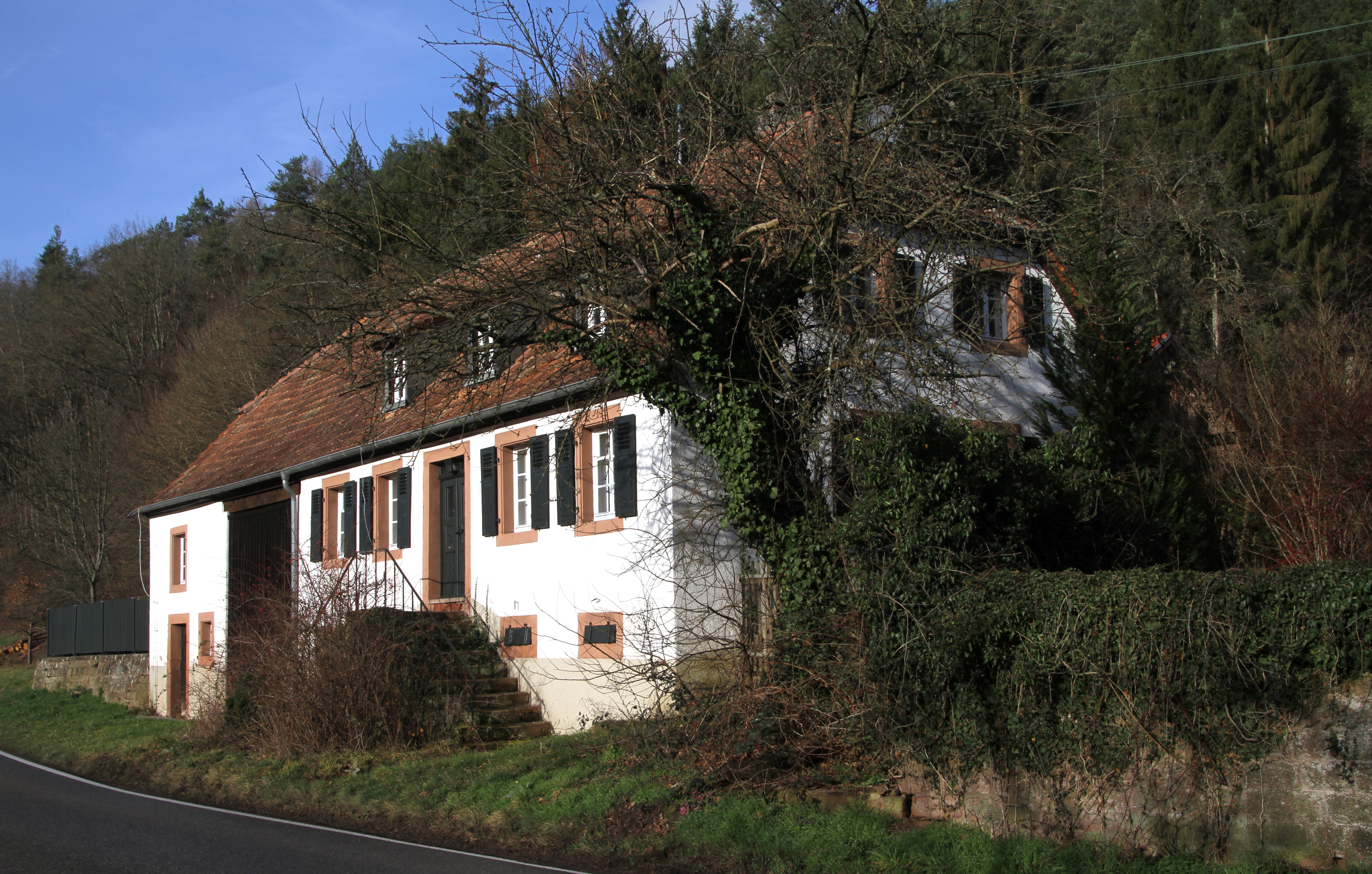
House of the foster
