= Hochstein (rocks) =

Coordinates: 49.1454°N 7.7915°E

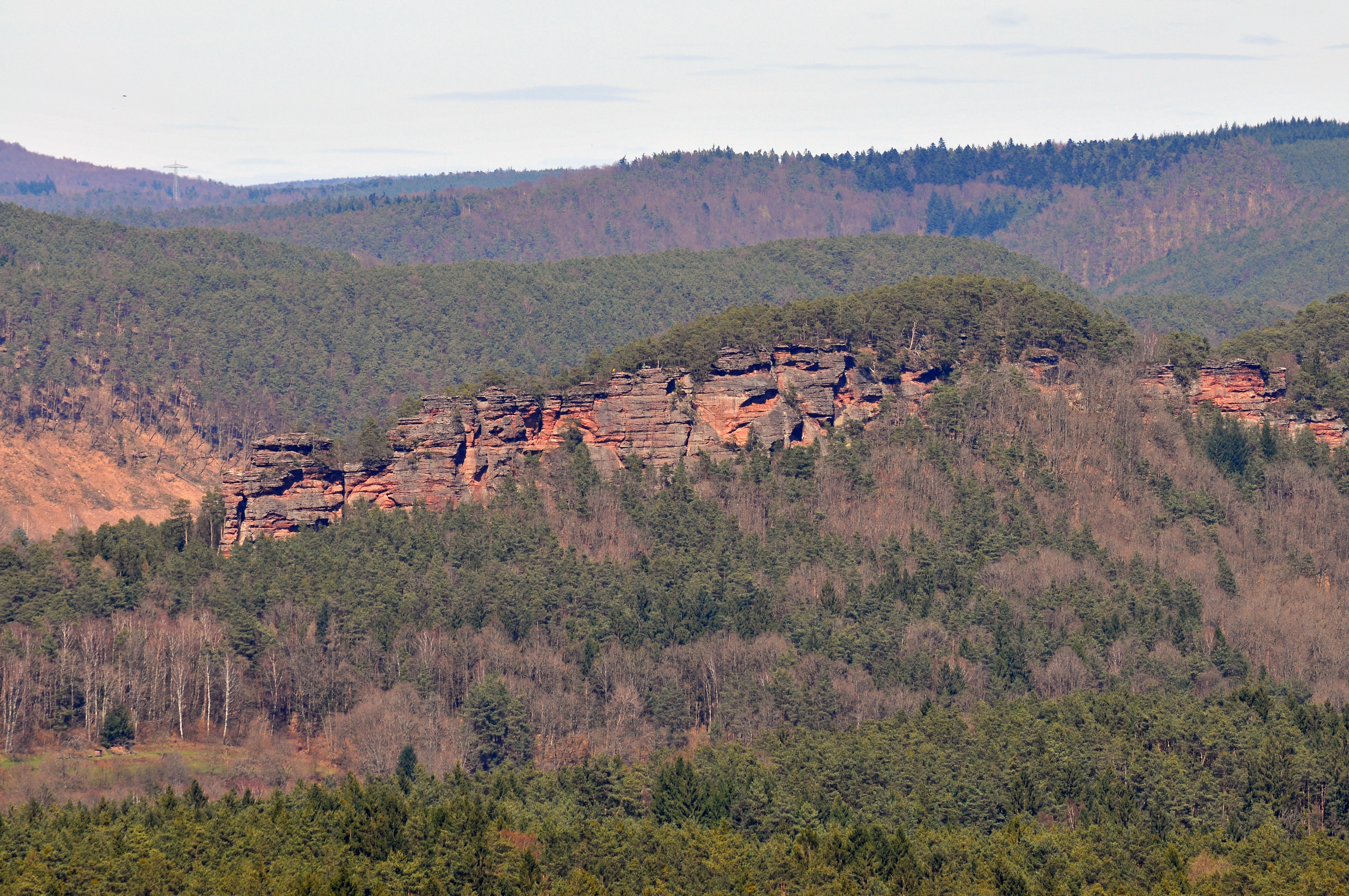
The Hochstein with its eastern and western massifs

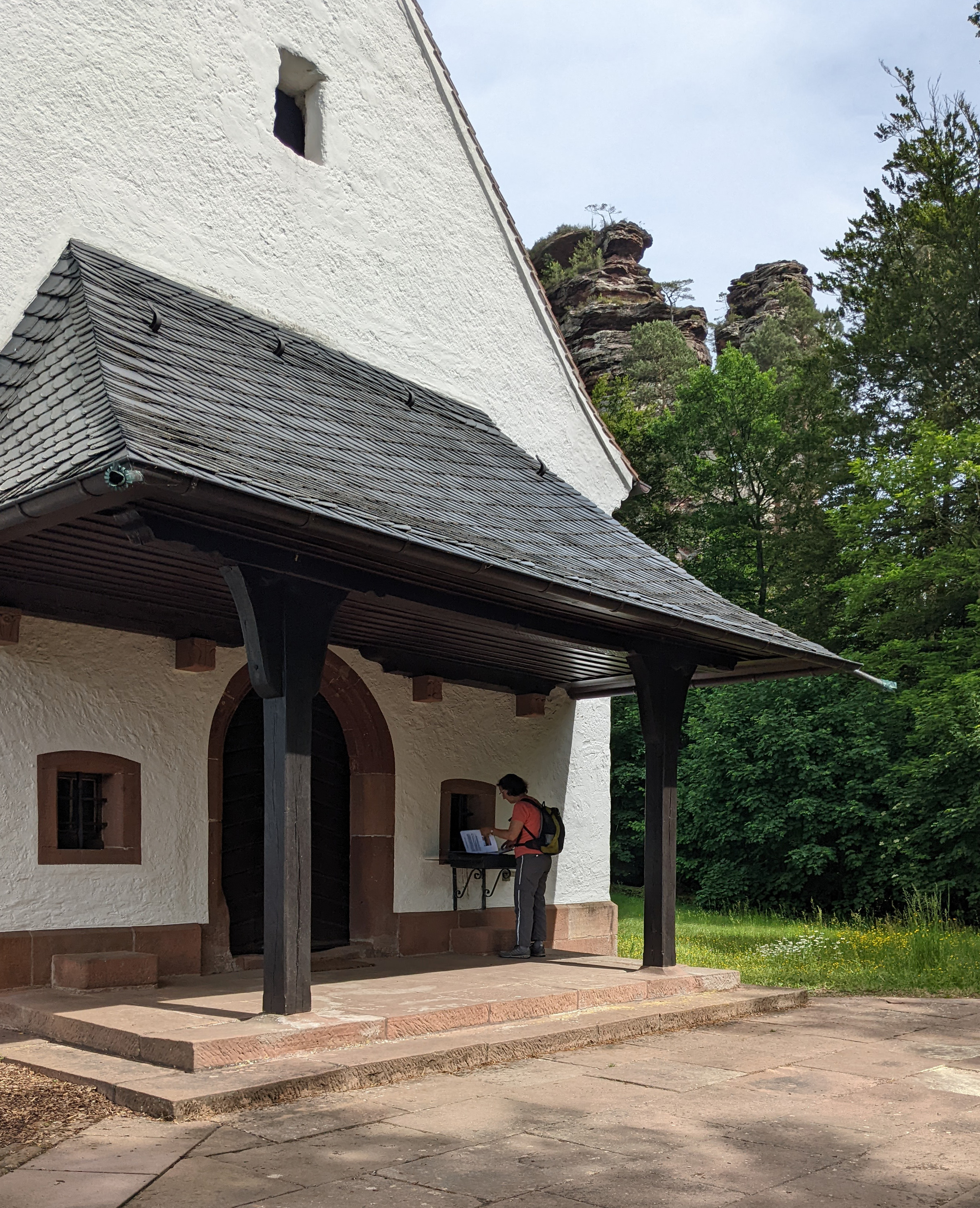
St. Michael's Chapel

The Hochstein, near the little southwest Palatine town of Dahn in southwest Germany, is a rock formation that is very popular with sports climbers and walkers.

== Structure and location ==
The Hochstein (345 m) belongs to the many bunter sandstone rock formations that are typical of the Wasgau, a region that covers the southern part of the Palatine Forest and the northern part of the Vosges. Because the region of Dahn is especially rich in such landforms, it is known as the Dahn Rock Country (Dahner Felsenland). The Hochstein - like the other rock outcrops of the region - is made of a harder rock that has partly withstood erosion over the centuries. The entire massif runs for 1½ km east of Dahn across the Wieslauter stream and is heavily subdivided.

Especially striking is the Hochsteinnadel ("Hochstein Needle") at the western tip of the massif, near St. Michael's Chapel. Next is the Gratturm, followed by the main Hochsteingrat ridge itself. From here there are outlying spurs running northeast and south, of which the Haferfels stands out.

== Flora ==
The remains of ancient juniper bushes are especially valuable, as are luminescent mosses in small corners of the Hochsteingrat.

== Features ==
In some places the leachate has created especially delicate weathering patterns.

Towards the end of the Second World War, families in Dahn sought refuge for a long time under overhanging rocks. Traces of their emergency shelter are still visible.

At the foot of the Hochstein is Dahn Cemetery which, with its 2,400 graves, is one of the largest war cemeteries in Germany.
