= Craig Dahn =

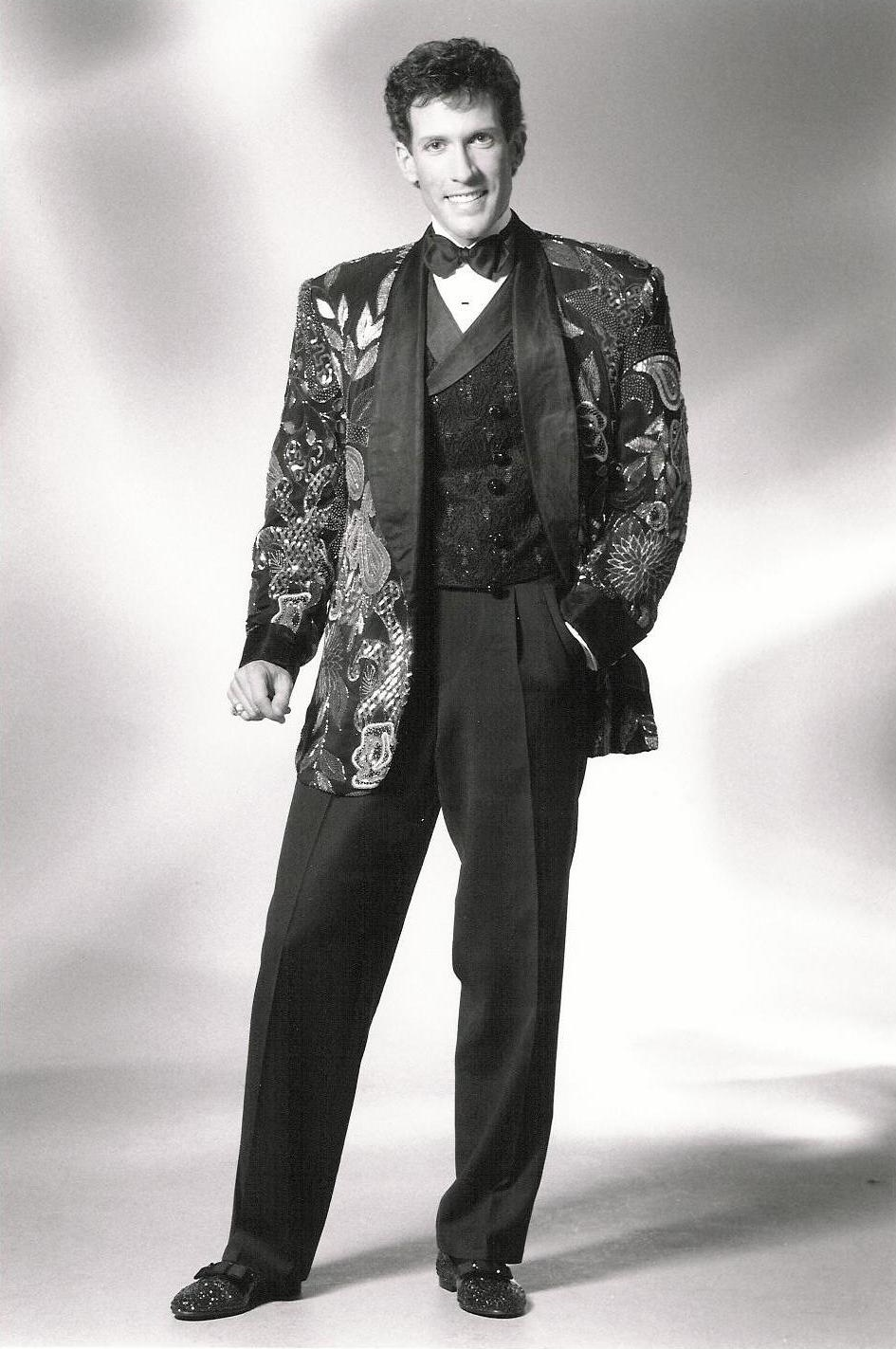
- Promotional Photo

Background information
- Born: September 23, 1964 (age 61)
- Origin: Waukegan, Illinois
- Occupation: Concert Pianist
- Instrument: Piano
- Website: craigdahn.com

Craig Steven Dahn (born September 23, 1964) is an American showman and concert pianist.

== Biography ==
Born in Waukegan, Illinois, Dahn's parents, Mert and CJ Dahn, enrolled their son in piano lessons at the age of eight. Within the year, he made his first stage appearance.

After moving to Phoenix, Arizona, at the age of sixteen, Dahn saw Liberace sitting in a parking lot. Tapping on the window, Dahn asked the flamboyant showman if he could talk to him for a moment. In addition to answering his questions, Liberace told him of a contest he was holding in Phoenix and invited him to participate. Competing against 2,000 other pianists, Dahn won and was awarded the privilege to appear on stage with Liberace. Dahn again performed with Liberace over the summer of 1981 at the Hilton Hotel in Las Vegas and the Phoenix Symphony Hall.

By the age of twenty, in addition to performing with Liberace, Dahn had also done the audience warm-up for the taping of a Lawrence Welk television show.

Dahn is a graduate of Arizona State University where he studied piano and organ with Arnold Bullock beginning at the age of thirteen. In 1992, Dahn returned to his alma mater as the first Arizona State University graduate to headline his own show at Gammage Auditorium.

In 1986, Dahn met Roy Rogers and Dale Evans at a private party during the grand opening of Happy Trails Resort. Evans invited Dahn to send her a tape so she could hear him play. After listening to the tape, she invited him to be a guest on her nationally televised program Date With Dale. Dahn has since made several additional network appearances on the Trinity Broadcasting Network (TBN).

Dahn's show Jump And Shout has been performed at the Sundome in Sun City West, Gammage Auditorium in Tempe, Arizona, Phoenix Symphony Hall and the Mesa Amphitheater.

In 1994, Dahn was selected by the owners of the new Silver Cloud Cruise Ship to perform for the private pre-inaugural parties held in Monte Carlo.

Dahn has performed at the 1992 summer Olympics in Barcelona, Spain, and opened for singer/actress Susan Anton and comedian Norm Crosby.

Since 1988, Dahn has headlined the showrooms of Royal Caribbean International, Celebrity Cruises, Cunard's QM2 and Queen Victoria, Princess Cruises, Seabourn Cruises, and Silversea Cruises with tributes to Elton John, Jerry Lee Lewis, Winifred Atwell, Lady Gaga and Liberace.

Using his own compositions, Dahn takes audiences on a musical journey through Classical, Dixieland, Jazz and Boogie Woogie styles.
