= Conrad IV of Tann =

Mediaeval Cleric

Conrad IV of Tann (German: Konrad IV. von Tann), also "of Thann" or "of Dahn", (died 1236) was the 48th Bishop of Speyer, holding office from 1233 to 1236.

== Familial connexions ==
Conrad came from the von Dahn family who, as episcopal ministeriales, owned estates in the southern Palatinate. The three castles of the Dahn as well as Neudahn Castle were initially all owned by the family.

== Life ==
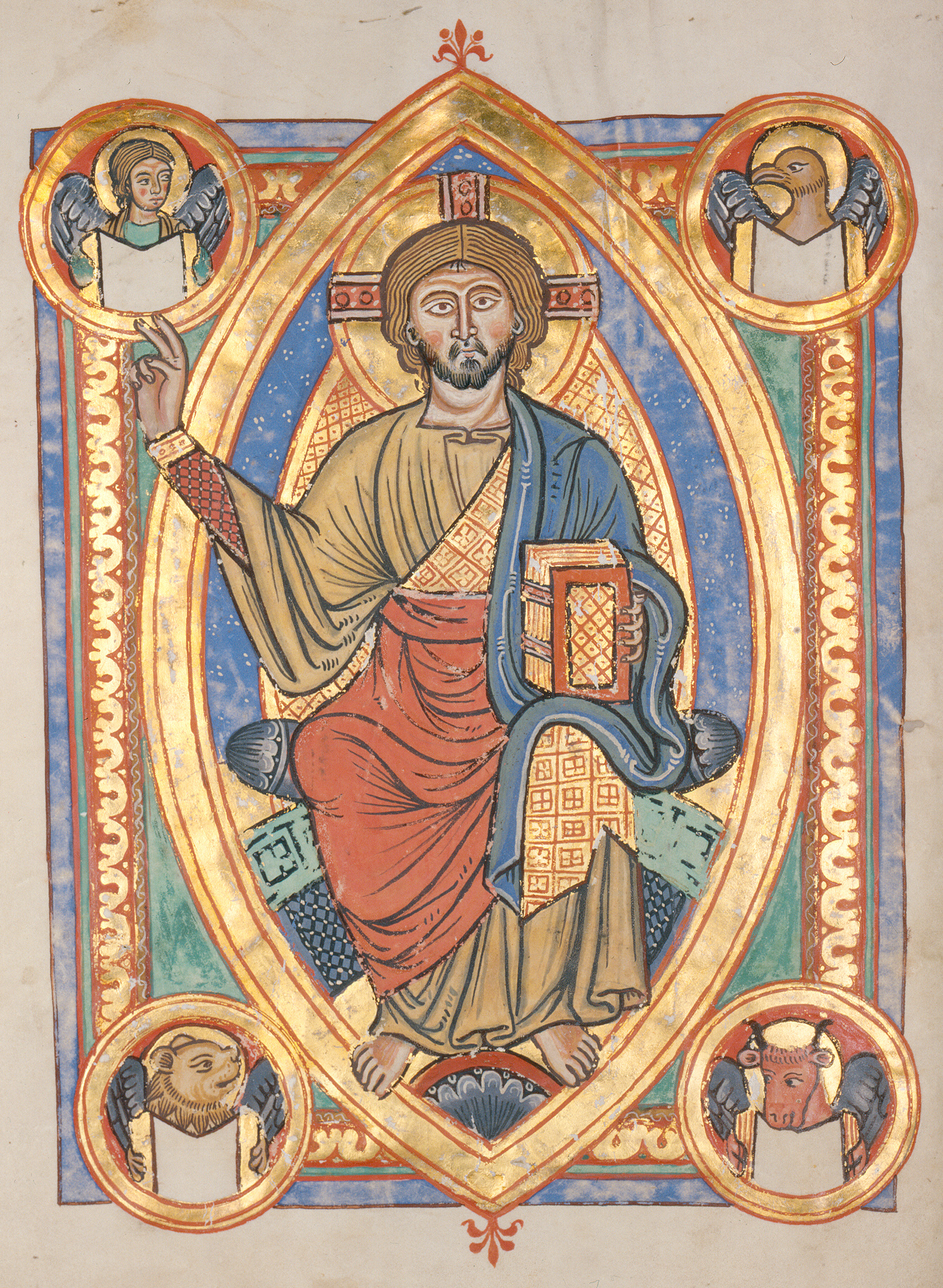
Image of Christ in the Speyer Evangelistar of Bishop Conrad of Tann

Conrad of Dahn, brother of the castellan, Frederick I of Dahn, was the cathedral canon in Worms, curator (Domkustos) of St. Cyriakus in Worms-Neuhausen, and provost of the chu

== Literature ==
- Hans Ammerich: Das Bistum Speyer und seine Geschichte, Vol. 2: Von der Stauferzeit (1125) bis zum Beginn des 16. Jahrhunderts; Kehl am Rhein, 1999; ISBN 3-927095-44-3. especially pp. 4–6.
- Gatz: Die Bischöfe des Hl. Röm. Reiches 1198-1448, p. 743
- Ludwig Stamer: Kirchengeschichte der Pfalz, Vol. 2; Speyer, 1949
- Sigmund Joseph Zimmern: Artikel Speyer in: Wetzer und Welte’s Kirchenlexikon oder Encyklopädie der katholischen Theologie und ihrer Hülfswissenschaften, Vol. 11; Freiburg: Herder’sche Verlagsbuchhandlung, 1882–1903; col. 596

Preceded by Beringer of Entringen	Bishop of Speyer; 1233–1236	Succeeded by Conrad V of Eberstein
