= Fischbach bei Dahn =

- Municipality
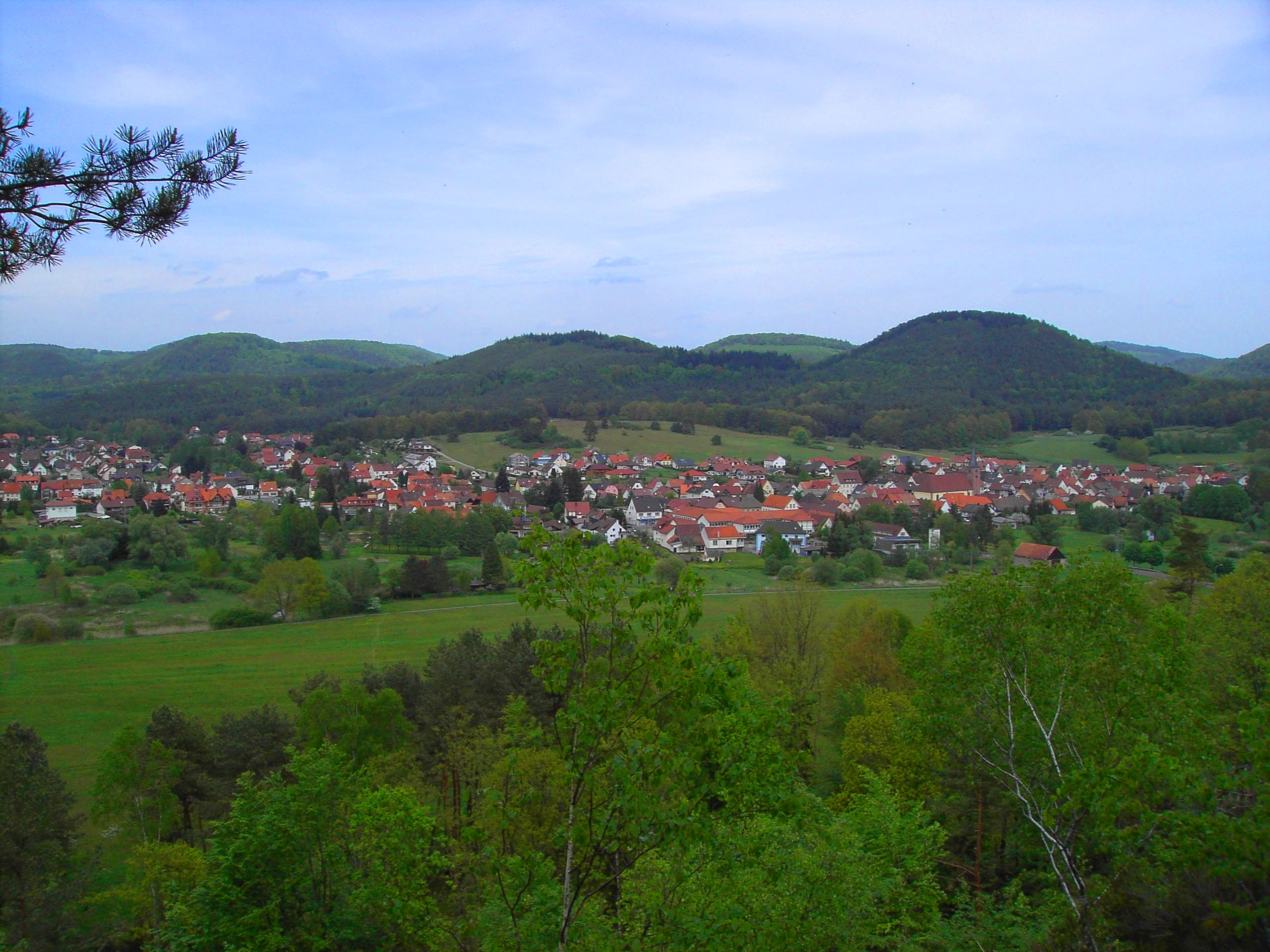

- Coat of arms

- Location of Fischbach bei Dahn within Südwestpfalz district
- Interactive map of Fischbach bei Dahn
- Location within Germany Location within Rhineland-Palatinate
- Coordinates: 49°05′15″N 7°42′38″E
- Country: Germany
- State: Rhineland-Palatinate
- District: Südwestpfalz
- Municipal assoc.: Dahner Felsenland

Government
  - Mayor (2019–24): Michael Schreiber

Area
  - Total: 32.87 km^{2} (12.69 sq mi)
- Elevation: 195 m (640 ft)

Population (2025-12-31)
  - Total: 1,314
  - Density: 39.98/km^{2} (103.5/sq mi)
- Time zone: UTC+01:00 (CET)
  - Summer (DST): UTC+02:00 (CEST)
- Postal codes: 66996
- Dialling codes: 06393
- Vehicle registration: PS
- Website: www.fischbach-bei-dahn.de

Fischbach bei Dahn (German pronunciation: [ˈfɪʃbax baɪ ˈdaːn], lit. 'Fischbach near Dahn') is a municipality in Südwestpfalz district, in Rhineland-Palatinate, western Germany.

The hollow in which Fischbach lies is surrounded by hills rising to around 400 metres above sea level. The highest hills in the general area are: to the northeast the Große Eyberg (514 m) and, to the south, beyond the French border, the Maimont (512 m). The summits of both hills are about four kilometres from the village.

When the US military began to downsize in the 1990s, the small US Army posts associated with Husterhoeh Kaserne (Pirmasens) were returned to Germany, including ones located at Maßweiler, Munchweiler, Fischbach, and Clausen.
