= Bundenthal =

- Municipality
- Coat of arms

- Location of Bundenthal within Südwestpfalz district
- Interactive map of Bundenthal
- Location within Germany Location within Rhineland-Palatinate
- Coordinates: 49°5′44″N 7°48′31″E
- Country: Germany
- State: Rhineland-Palatinate
- District: Südwestpfalz
- Municipal assoc.: Dahner Felsenland

Government
  - Mayor (2019–24): Wolfgang Morio

Area
  - Total: 10.21 km^{2} (3.94 sq mi)
- Elevation: 190 m (620 ft)

Population (2025-12-31)
  - Total: 1,018
  - Density: 99.71/km^{2} (258.2/sq mi)
- Time zone: UTC+01:00 (CET)
  - Summer (DST): UTC+02:00 (CEST)
- Postal codes: 76891
- Dialling codes: 06394
- Vehicle registration: PS

Bundenthal (German pronunciation: [ˈbʊndn̩taːl]) is a municipality in Südwestpfalz district, in Rhineland-Palatinate, western Germany.

== Notable people ==
- Ludwig Kneiss (1830–1900), singer and stage actor

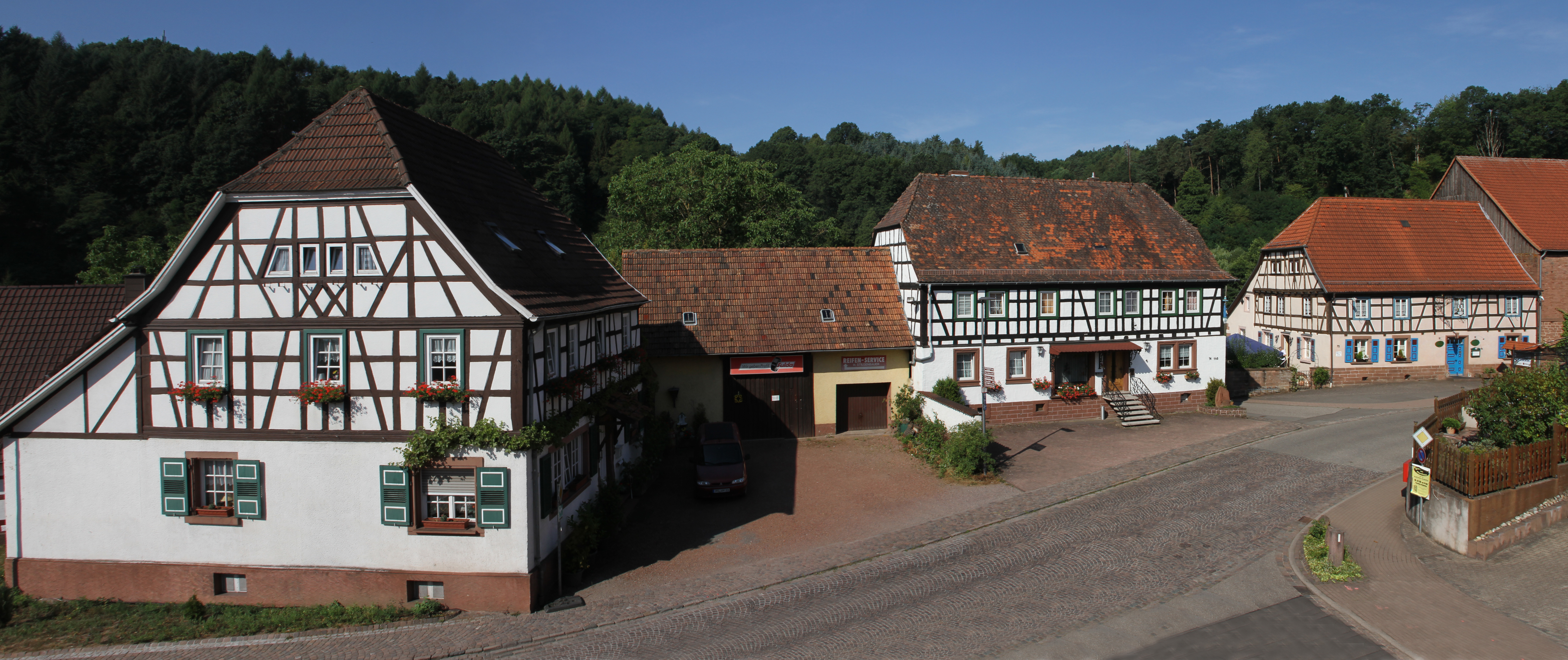
Main street in Bundenthal
