= Château de Lœwenstein =

Ruined castle in Bas-Rhin, Alsace, France

Coordinates: 49°03′11″N 7°47′11″E

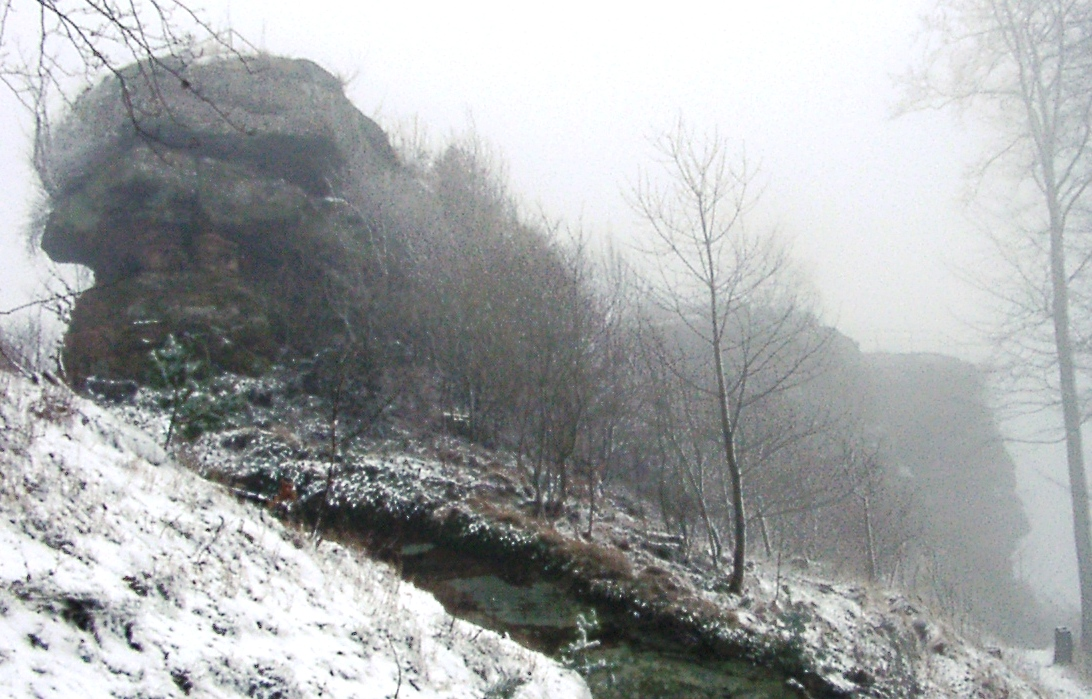

The Château de Lœwenstein is a ruined castle in the commune of Wingen in the Bas-Rhin département in Alsace, France. It is dated to the 12th century and was destroyed in 1387.

== History ==
The castle is also known as Lindenschmidt. It was built for the lords of Fleckenstein and in 1283 it became a fief of the Holy Roman Empire. It was a lair of brigands at the end of the 14th century. The castle is divided into two parts which, at some time in its history, belonged to different lords.

It has been listed since 1898 as a monument historique by the French Ministry of Culture.
