= Schindhard =

- Municipality
- Coat of arms

- Location of Schindhard within Südwestpfalz district
- Interactive map of Schindhard
- Location within Germany Location within Rhineland-Palatinate
- Coordinates: 49°8′30.79″N 7°49′14.12″E
- Country: Germany
- State: Rhineland-Palatinate
- District: Südwestpfalz
- Municipal assoc.: Dahner Felsenland

Government
  - Mayor (2019–24): Tobias Herberg

Area
  - Total: 4.36 km^{2} (1.68 sq mi)
- Elevation: 214 m (702 ft)

Population (2025-12-31)
  - Total: 509
  - Density: 117/km^{2} (302/sq mi)
- Time zone: UTC+01:00 (CET)
  - Summer (DST): UTC+02:00 (CEST)
- Postal codes: 66996
- Dialling codes: 06391
- Vehicle registration: PS

Schindhard is a municipality in Südwestpfalz district, in Rhineland-Palatinate, western Germany.

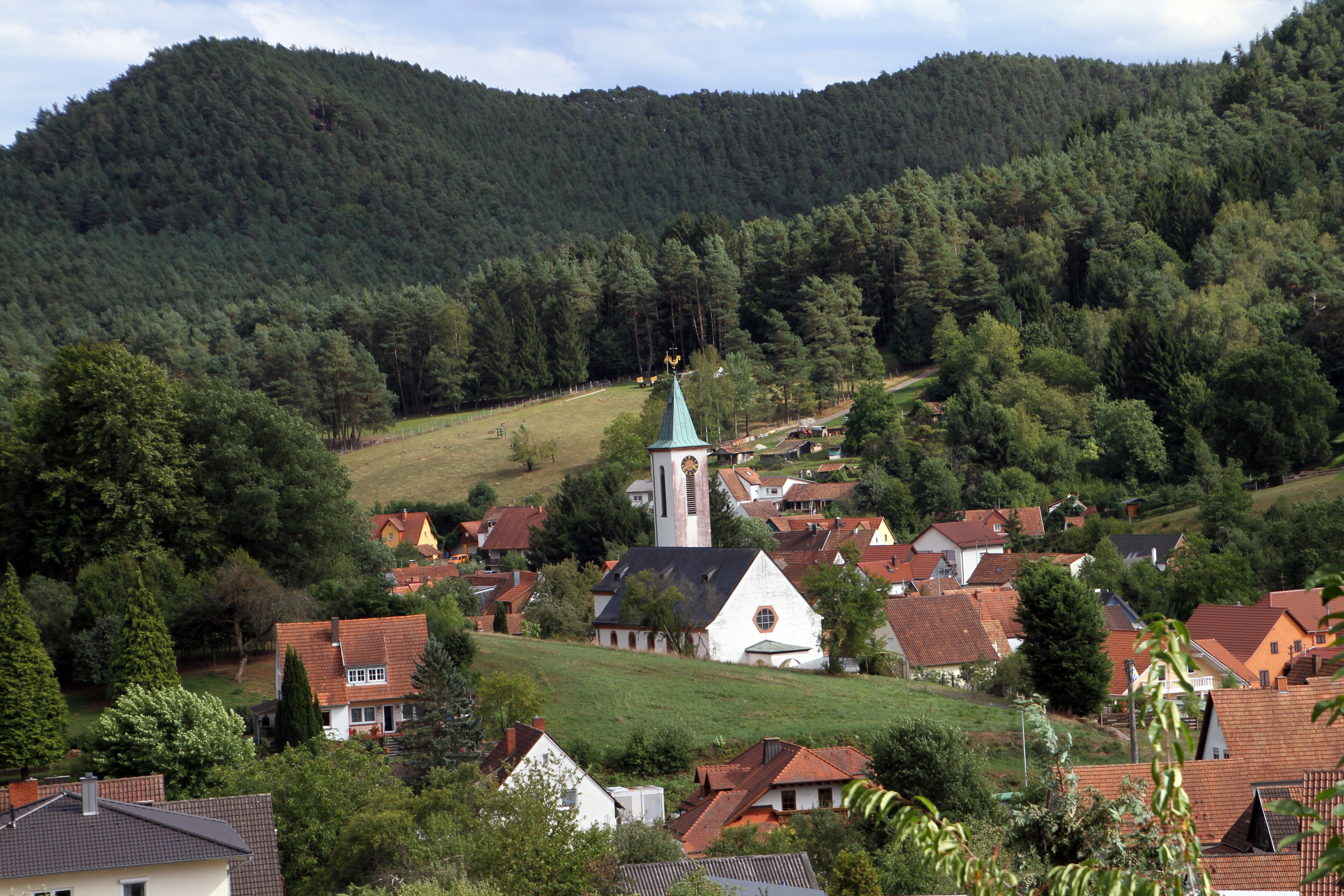
Village with St. Antonius
