= Busenberg =

- Municipality
- Coat of arms

- Location of Busenberg within Südwestpfalz district
- Interactive map of Busenberg
- Location within Germany Location within Rhineland-Palatinate
- Coordinates: 49°7′53″N 7°49′37″E
- Country: Germany
- State: Rhineland-Palatinate
- District: Südwestpfalz
- Municipal assoc.: Dahner Felsenland

Government
  - Mayor (2019–24): Christof Müller

Area
  - Total: 9.64 km^{2} (3.72 sq mi)
- Elevation: 245 m (804 ft)

Population (2025-12-31)
  - Total: 1,155
  - Density: 120/km^{2} (310/sq mi)
- Time zone: UTC+01:00 (CET)
  - Summer (DST): UTC+02:00 (CEST)
- Postal codes: 76891
- Dialling codes: 06391
- Vehicle registration: PS

Busenberg (German pronunciation: [ˈbuːzn̩bɛʁk]) is a municipality in Südwestpfalz district, in Rhineland-Palatinate, western Germany.

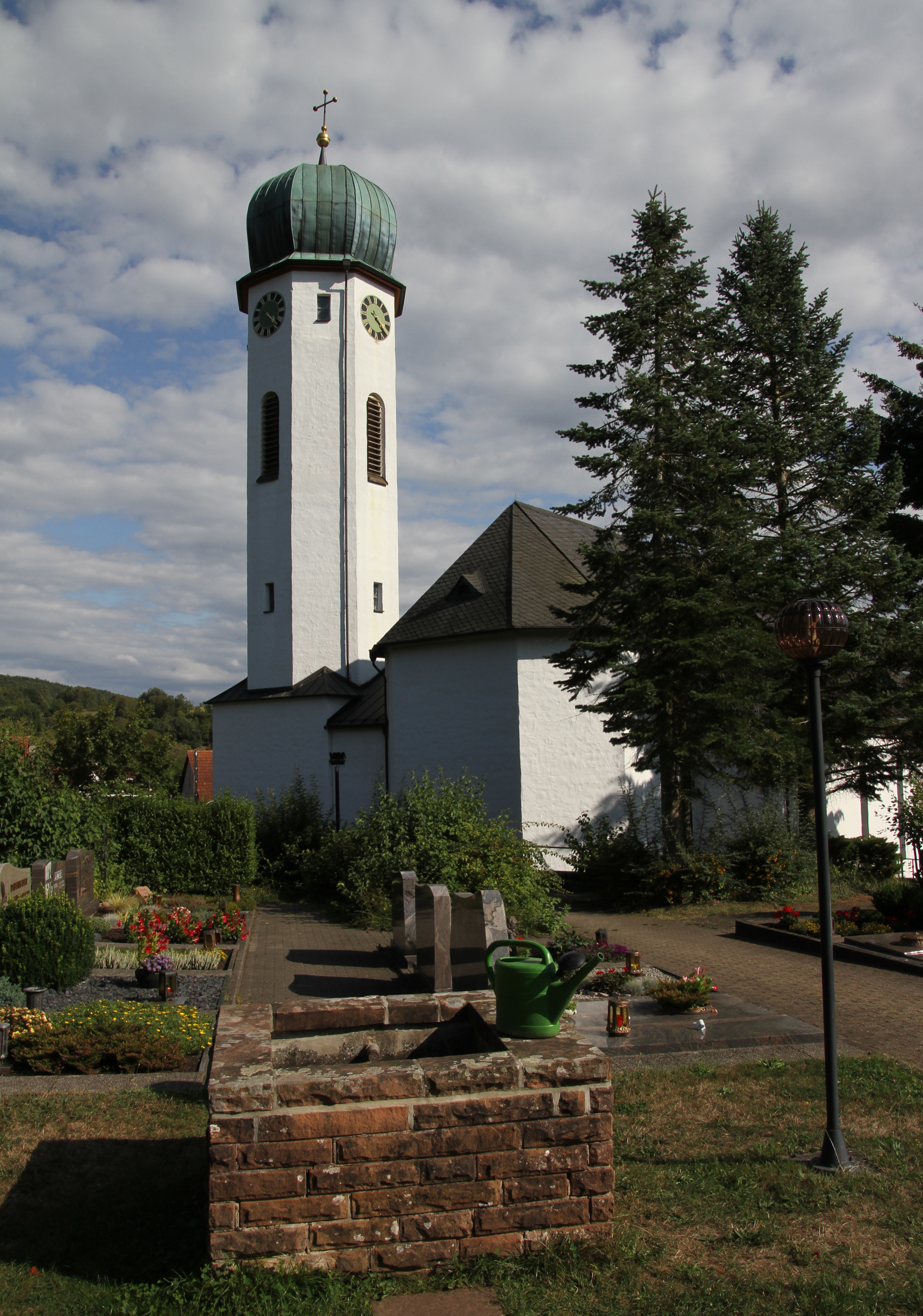
St. Jakobus
