= Teufelstisch =

Teufelstisch is German for "devil's table" and may refer to:

- Teufelstisch (Bavarian Forest), a mountain in Bavaria, Germany
- Devil's Table (Fichtel Mountains), a rock formation in the Fichtel Mountains, Germany
- Devil's Table (Lake Constance), a rock formation in Lake Constance, opposite Überlingen.
- Devil's Table (Hinterweidenthal), a rock formation near Hinterweidenthal in the Palatinate, Germany
- Devil's Table (Lemberg), a mushroom rock at Salzwoog in the Palatinate, Germany
