= Salzbach (Lauter) =

River in Germany

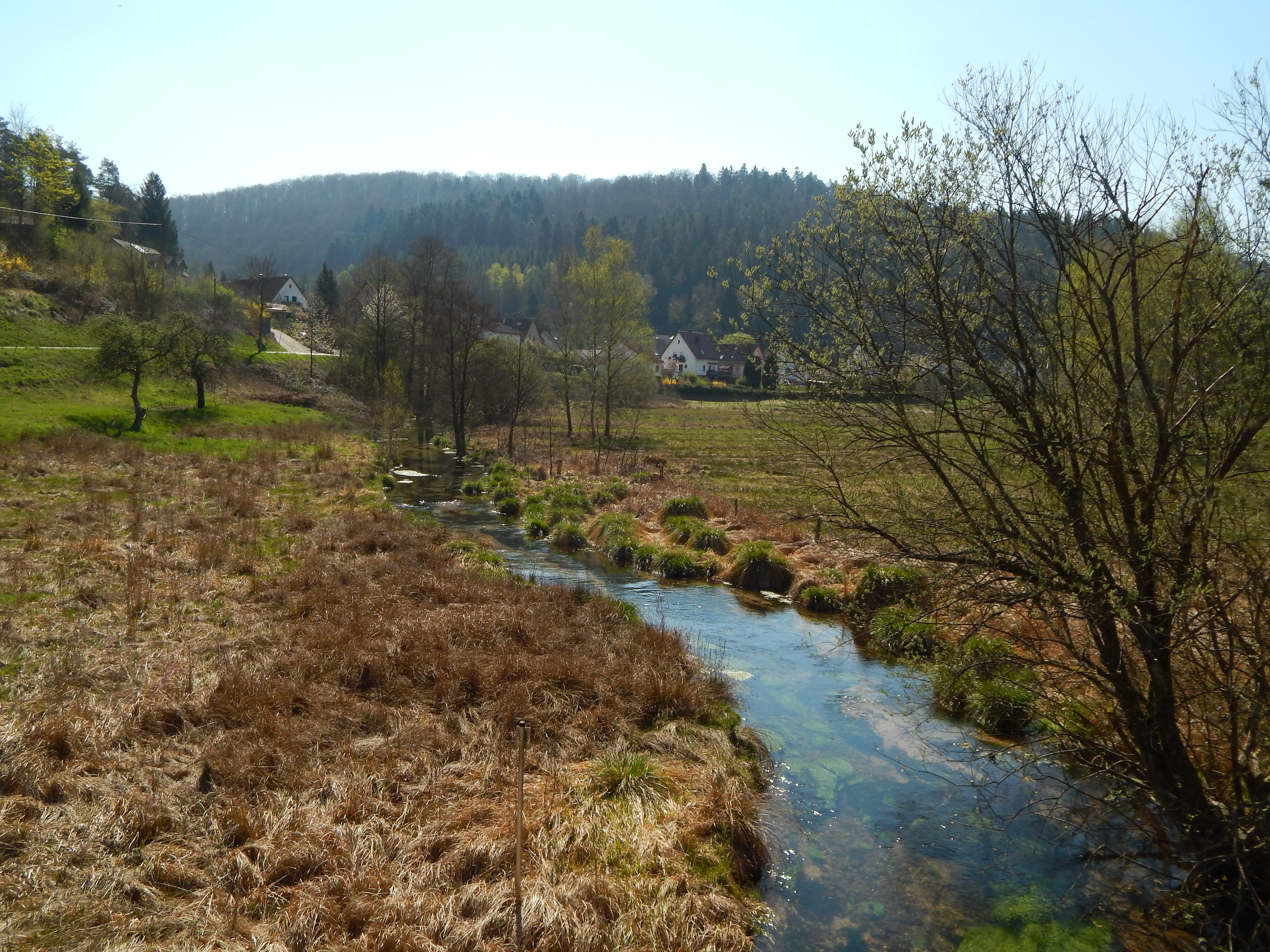

Location
- Country: Germany
- State: Rhineland-Palatinate
- Location: Palatine Forest
- Reference no.: DE: 23722

Physical characteristics
- Source
  - location: as the Kröppenbach (headstream of the Buchbach) on the Hoher Kopf
  - coordinates: 49°07′17″N 7°38′32″E
  - elevation: ca. 460 m above sea level (NN)
- Mouth
  - location: in Kaltenbach into the Wieslauter
  - coordinates: 49°11′59″N 7°44′51″E
  - elevation: 216 m above sea level (NN)
- Length: 17.0 km (10.6 mi)
- Basin size: 52.375 km^{2} (20.222 sq mi)

Basin features
- Progression: Lauter→ Rhine→ North Sea
- Landmarks: Villages: Lemberg, Hinterweidenthal, Ruppertsweiler
- Waterbodies: Reservoirs: Salzwoog
- Rock formations of Salzwoog and Kaltenbach Devil's Table

The Salzbach is a river in Rhineland-Palatinate, Germany. It is initially called the Kröppenbach and then the Buchbach. With a length of around 17 kilometres (11 mi), it is the longest tributary of the Lauter, which here in its upper reaches is known as the Wieslauter. It flows through the northwestern Wasgau, a hill range which comprises the southern part of the Palatinate Forest in the German state of Rhineland-Palatinate and the northern part of the Vosges in the French departments of Bas-Rhin and Moselle.

== Course ==
Strictly speaking the stream called the Salzbach does not have a spring source because it is formed by the confluence of the 10-kilometre-long (6.2 mi) Kröppenbach/Buchbach, which hydrologically is the source of the Salzbach, and the Storrbach which empties into it from the right between the villages of Langmühle and Salzwoog below the Devil's Table of Salzwoog. The Kröppenbach/Buchbach rises on the Hoher Kopf (467 m); the good 5-kilometre-long (3.1 mi) Storrbach on the Großer Spießkopf (414 m).

After this confluence, the Salzbach forms the parish boundary, for the rest of its 7 km (4.3 mi) course, between Lemberg and Hinterweidenthal, then between Ruppertsweiler and Hinterweidenthal. In the hamlet of Salzwoog it flows through an eponymous pond. At the height of the Hinterweidenthal hamlet of Kaltenbach and below the Devil's Table of Kaltenbach, the Salzbach discharges from the right into the Wieslauter.

== Tributaries ==
- Kleiner Kröppenbach (left), 0.3 km (0.19 mi)
- Großer Kröppenbach (left), 1.6 km (0.99 mi)
- Ransbächel (left), 1.1 km (0.68 mi)
- Brunnentalbach (left), 1.3 km (0.81 mi)
- Schimmelbach (left), 1.0 km (0.62 mi)
- Katzenbach (right), 1.1 km (0.68 mi)
- Storrbach (right), 5.2 km (3.2 mi)
- Steinbach (left)
- Lindelbach (right), 0.6 km (0.37 mi)
- Schiffelsbach (left)
- Walmersbach (left), 1.6 km (0.99 mi)
- Kaltenbach (left), 1.4 km (0.87 mi)

== History ==
The name of the stream does not refer to its salt (German: Salz) content, but to the old customs station of Salzwoog, where salt traders had to pay a tax on crossing the border between the territories of the Bishopric of Speyer and the Duchy of Palatinate-Zweibrücken. The former border post of Salzwoog lay on the bridge above the Salzbach, that now carries the state road, L 487 (Hinterweidenthal–Fischbach) and L 486 (Lemberg–Dahn) over the pond.

== See also ==
- List of rivers of Rhineland-Palatinate
