= Wieslauterbahn =

Railway line in western Germany

The Wieslauterbahn, also called Wasgaubahn, Wieslautertalbahn or Lauterbahn, is a branch line in Rhineland-Palatinate. It branches off from the Landau-Rohrbach line at Hinterweidenthal Ost station and runs via Dahn to Bundenthal-Rumbach. It gained its greatest significance in excursion traffic.

The line was opened in 1911 as one of the last within the Palatinate. In 1966, in response to competing private transport, passenger services were discontinued, with the exception of the "Bundenthaler" excursion train starting in Ludwigshafen. This train was terminated in 1976. Freight services continued until 1995. In 1997, passenger services were reintroduced on Sundays and public holidays, the continuation of which was temporarily at risk after the turn of the millennium, but has since been secured for the medium term. In the following years, the service was extended to Wednesdays and Saturdays. Residents of the region repeatedly resisted plans to close the line for decades, thus helping to preserve it.

== History ==
=== First initiatives (1862–1870) ===
The first plans for the construction of a railway through the Wasgau region and its Dahner Felsenland section existed as early as 1862. The line was to run from Zweibrücken via Pirmasens, Kaltenbach, Dahn and Bergzabern and join the Palatinate Maximilian Railway, which opened in 1855, at Winden. The main argument was initially the very productive timber transportation in the area.

Together with the full length of the Winden-Karlsruhe railway, which opened in 1865, it was intended to act as part of a further route for transporting coal from the Saar region. An additional reason for building a line through the Wasgau was the tourism potential seen at the time. However, the planned railway line was in competition with the planned Südpfalzbahn Landau-Zweibrücken, which was to run further north along the Queich and Rodalb rivers via Annweiler. As the construction of a Wasgau line in an east-west direction would have proved difficult due to the complicated topography, only the Southern Palatinate line was initially considered, which was opened in 1874 and 1875. Only the Winden-Bad Bergzabern line, which opened in 1870, emerged from the project to build a railway across the Wasgau.

=== Further plans (1870–1900) ===
After the Franco-Prussian War, neighboring Alsace-Lorraine fell to the newly founded German Empire. As a direct result, the Alsatian town of Weißenburg (formerly Wissembourg) made efforts to build a route along the Wieslauter via Dahn and Selz to Rastatt to serve international traffic. A corresponding committee was formed in 1873. In the same year, another committee was formed in Dahn to plan a line along the Wieslauter. At the same time, the management of the Palatinate Railways presented plans for a line from Hinterweidenthal to Bergzabern, which was to run mainly along the Wieslauter. A connection to Weißenburg in the form of a branch line was included from the outset. Although the Bavarian government provided an interest guarantee, the economic situation in the 1870s prevented these plans from being implemented.

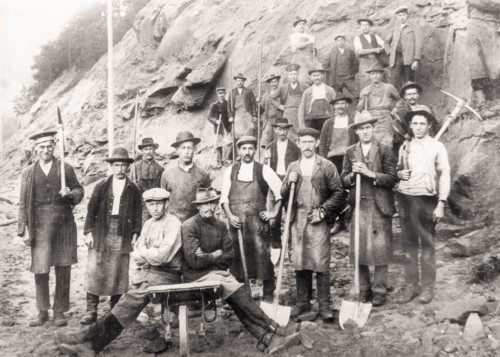
Construction workers building the track (1909)

It was not until the 1890s that efforts to provide the region with a rail connection were revived. Ludwig Foohs, the Dahner Rentamtmann, in particular, campaigned vehemently for a rail connection to his home town. However, there were again different ideas about the actual route. Bergzabern wanted the branch line starting in Winden to be extended to Dahn, while the latter pushed for a line to Weißenburg. There were also plans for a connection from Bergzabern via Schönau to Saarburg, which would serve supra-regional traffic. In 1899, the Bavarian side began concrete planning for a connection between Pirmasens-Lemberg-Dahn-Weißenburg. After it turned out that the financial outlay of 7.5 million marks for such a line would be too expensive, the decision was made in favor of a much cheaper branch line via Hinterweidenthal to Bundenthal, which was to branch off from the Südpfalzbahn Landau-Zweibrücken.

=== Approval, construction and opening ===
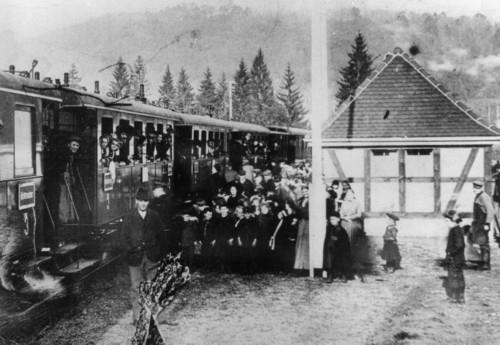
Inaugural train on 1 December 1911 in Hinterweidenthal Ort

The project was approved by law in 1904. The state subsidy amounted to a total of 1,699,700 marks in accordance with the "Treatment of existing vicinal railways and the construction of secondary railways". The detailed project planning was completed towards the end of 1907. Negotiations then took place to acquire the necessary land. The line was originally scheduled to open at the beginning of 1909. Construction of the line did not actually begin until that year. The nationalization of the Palatinate railway network, which had already been planned in 1905 but did not take place until 1 January 1909, also delayed the construction of the railway. The new branch station Kaltenbach Ost was built on the Südpfalzbahn between the Hauenstein and Hinterweidenthal-Kaltenbach stops especially for the new railway line. Hinterweidenthal-Kaltenbach station was given the new name Kaltenbach. As neither the Kaltenbach station nor the new station was conveniently close to the settlement area of Hinterweidenthal, the municipality was given a station on the branch line in the immediate vicinity of the town. Further stations were built in Dahn, Reichenbach, Bruchweiler and Bundenthal.

After almost three years of construction and with great material sacrifices by the valley inhabitants, i.e. 300,000 marks, the Hinterweidenthal-Bundenthal local line will be opened to traffic tomorrow

— Pfälzer Volkszeitung

The line was opened on 1 December 1911. The first train headed for Bundenthal with a class T 4.I steam locomotive and was decorated with blue and white flags. The opening day was very popular with the public at all stations. The line was initially operated by the Royal Bavarian State Railways, which had owned the entire Palatinate rail network for almost three years.

=== First years (1911–1920) ===
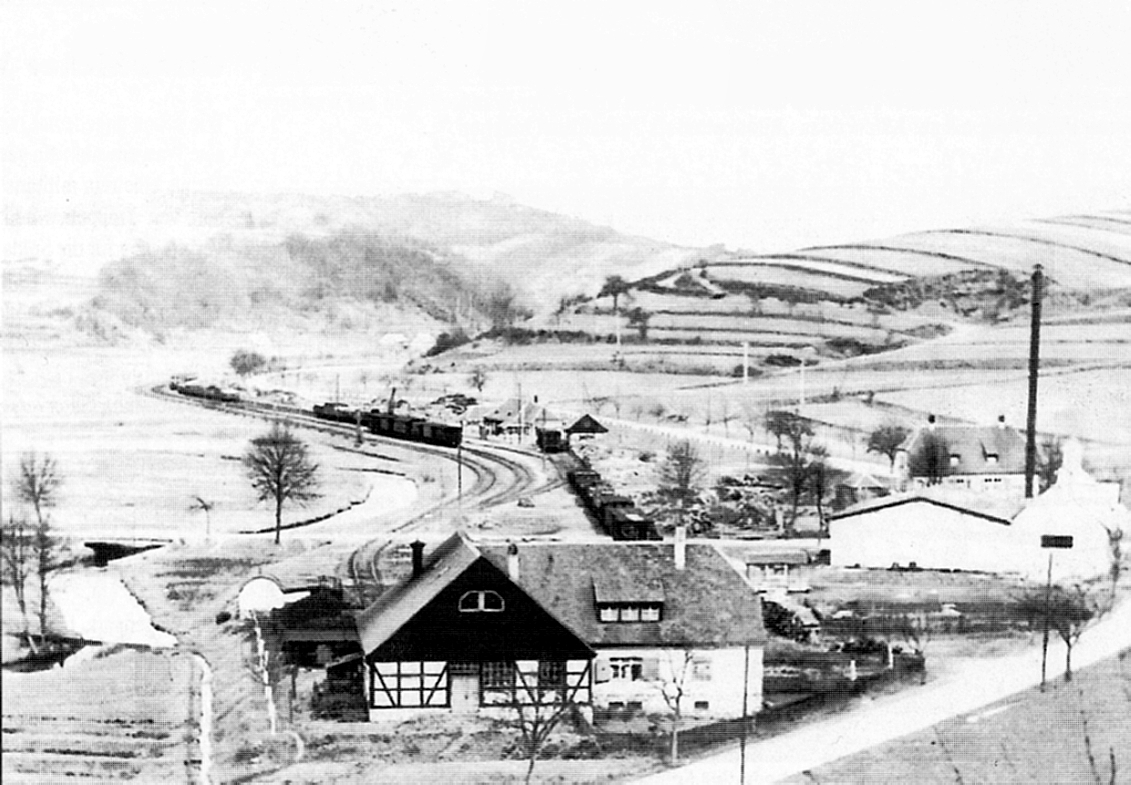
Bundenthal-Rumbach station in 1911

The opening of the Wieslauterbahn gave a boost to tourism in the region. Just a few years after the opening of the line, an excursion train from Landau to Bundenthal-Rumbach ran every Sunday on the initiative of the Palatinate Forest Association. Such a train had already existed from 1906, but in the early years the destination was Pirmasens.

The towns of Bergzabern and Weißenburg continued to hope that the railway line would be extended eastwards from Bundenthal. The government in Bavaria had already declared its willingness to build the extension to Weißenburg on Palatinate territory in 1910, provided that in return the Imperial Railways in Alsace-Lorraine went along with the planned construction of a Kaiserslautern-Pirmasens-Trulben-Eppenbrunn-Bitsch main line. In April 1914, everything initially pointed to the line being linked through to Weissenburg in Alsace. However, the outbreak of the First World War four months later prevented the construction of this connection. As Weißenburg (French: Wissembourg), together with the rest of Alsace, became part of France again after the end of the war, the corresponding plans finally came to a standstill.

In the period that followed, initiatives were formed to continue the line southwards along the Sûre, in particular to connect the villages of Schönau, Fischbach and Ludwigswinkel, which had previously remained isolated, to the rail network.

After the First World War, the military occupation of the areas on the left bank of the Rhine by Allied troops began in 1919. From then on, the catchment area of the Wieslauterbahn was in the French-occupied zone. Rail operations initially remained in the hands of the Bavarian State Railways.

=== Development under the German Reichsbahn (1920–1945) ===
On 1 April 1920 the line became the property of the Deutsche Reichsbahn. In 1922, the line was incorporated into the newly founded Reichsbahndirektion Ludwigshafen. After the start of the Ruhr War, the French military took over the operation of the railways in the occupied territories at the beginning of 1923. This government operation also affected the branch line in the Wieslautertal and lasted until 15 November 1924.

At the instigation of the French military, which operated a camp in Ludwigswinkel as part of the Allied occupation of the Rhineland, the short-lived Wasgauwaldbahn, which began in Bundenthal, was built from 1920. The original plan was to build it in standard gauge as a continuation of the Wieslauterbahn via Niederschlettenbach-Nothweiler-Schönau-Fischbach; the Reichsschatzministerium only allowed a narrow-gauge version for cost reasons.

In 1935, the Reichsbahn modernized the line. Among other things, the en route stations received new signaling technology with mechanical Bruchsal-type signal boxes. As part of the dissolution of the Ludwigshafen Reichsbahn Directorate, the line came under the jurisdiction of the Saarbrücken Directorate on 1 May 1936. The railway was used to transport materials and workers for the construction of the Westwall, and a railway gun was also placed at Hinterweidenthal Ort station. With the outbreak of the Second World War, the Reich government designated a 20-kilometre-wide strip near the border with France as the Red Zone, which included the Wieslauterbahn. This resulted in the evacuation of the inhabitants of this area, bringing passenger traffic to a standstill for a year. Although the Wieslauterbahn was the target of several air raids during the Second World War, there was hardly any major damage. Nevertheless, traffic had to be restricted or suspended several times as the war progressed.

=== The decline after the Second World War ===
After the Second World War, the railway was under the control of the Betriebsvereinigung der Südwestdeutschen Eisenbahnen (SWDE), which was transferred to the newly founded Deutsche Bundesbahn (DB) in 1949. The latter incorporated the Wieslauterbahn into the Mainz Federal Railway Directorate, to which it assigned all railway lines within the newly created federal state of Rhineland-Palatinate. In 1956, Dahn was given the additional stop Dahn Süd. The reception building at Dahn station had to be rebuilt due to war damage, which went into operation in 1959. In the 1950s, an approximately one-kilometre-long siding to a NATO fuel depot was also built between Hinterweidenthal and Dahn.

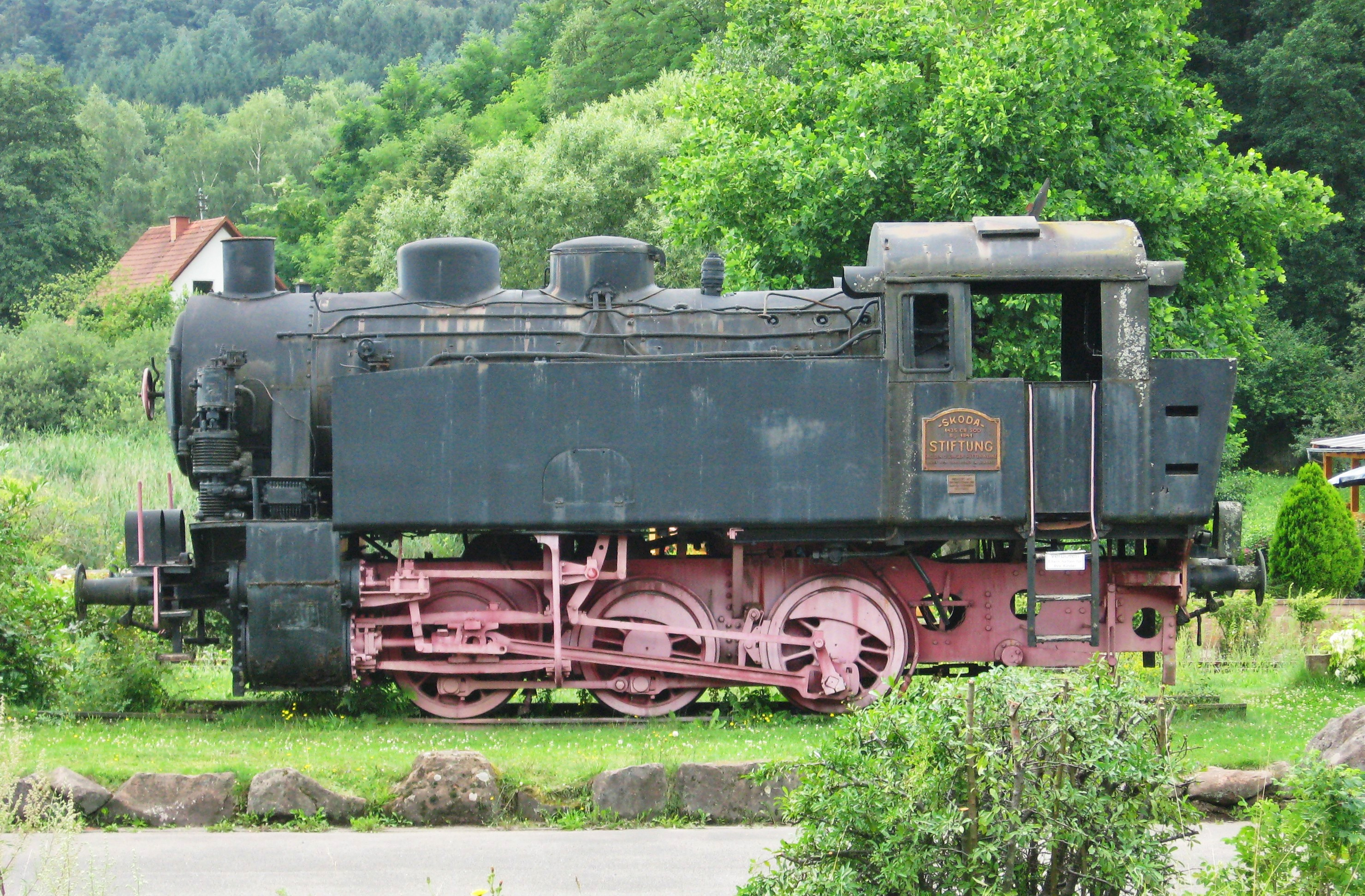
The works locomotive of the former Dillinger Hütte was set up at Bundenthal-Rumbach station by the Fördergemeinschaft Wasgau e. V. in 1972.

The significant increase in car traffic in the post-war period meant that use of the line declined. For this reason, Deutsche Bundesbahn applied to the Federal Ministry of Transport to discontinue passenger traffic. In addition, Deutsche Bundesbahn had introduced parallel rail bus services, which diverted more passengers away from rail transport. This was one of the reasons why Deutsche Bundesbahn declared the operation of the Wieslauterbahn unprofitable. On 25 September 1966 it discontinued passenger services on the line. The population protested so vehemently against this plan that they delayed the departure of the last scheduled train at Dahn station on 24 September 1966 by several hours. Only the "Bundenthaler" excursion train continued to run for the time being due to the great demand. This train also ran for the last time in May 1976. From then on, apart from freight trains, only special trains used the line, such as the "Deutsche Weinstraße" train.

As early as 1971, the line was transferred to the jurisdiction of its Saarbrücken counterpart as part of the dissolution of the Mainz directorate. The sporadic freight traffic officially came to a standstill on 30 May 1995, after the last freight train had already run on 2 May. At the same time, the Saarbrücken Federal Railway Directorate was endeavoring to close the line completely. To achieve this, it shifted all the costs required to maintain the line to the few special trains.

=== Reactivation (1997–2006) ===
Many local citizens did not want to accept the closure of the entire operation. This led to the founding of the Eisenbahnfreunde Dahn e. V. association in 1987, whose aims included saving the Wieslauterbahn from closure and placing it under a preservation order. The efforts were soon successful: on 1 June 1997 the Wieslauterbahn was reactivated, initially only on Sundays and public holidays. This also led to the reactivation of the "Bundenthaler", which initially started in Neustadt. Initially, two pairs of trains ran, the number of which soon doubled. The new owner of the line was the municipality of Dahner Felsenland. The latter also spent DM 180,000 on renovating the railway facilities, while the municipality of Hauenstein contributed DM 20,000 and the district of Südwestpfalz DM 100,000. In the meantime, the Hinterweidenthal branch station had been given the name Hinterweidenthal Ost, as its previous name had been given to the stop on the Landau-Rohrbach line in the district of Kaltenbach. The infrastructure company was initially Kuckucksbähnel-Infrastruktur GmbH, which has operated the museum railway of the same name in the Elmstein Valley since the 1980s.

A few years after reactivation, the line was once again threatened with closure: in 2001, plans were announced by the town of Dahn to make way for a bypass road along 800 metres of the railway. The municipality of Dahner Felsenland supported this project. However, local resistance was once again evident and experts also criticized the planned closure.

=== Recent past (since 2006) ===
In 2006, the railway was put out to public tender. A total of four rail infrastructure companies then applied. The contract was awarded to Albtal-Verkehrs-Gesellschaft (AVG), which leased the line on 1 September 2007 for a period of ten years. DB Regio continues to operate the Wieslauterbahn alongside AVG. The line is now part of the Südpfalz network. Passenger numbers have risen continuously, especially since the 2000s. In 2009, the Wieslauterbahn achieved an increase of 40 percent; other figures speak of more than 60 percent. The lease agreement with AVG was extended beyond 2017.

In 2023, AVG terminated the lease agreement on 31 August. The background to this is a dispute over funding from the state of Rhineland-Palatinate for a planned complete refurbishment of the railway. After discussions, the state, AVG and the municipality of Dahner Felsenland agreed that operations would be maintained at least until the regular end of the season at the end of October and that the special trains to the Martinimarkt in Dahn on 12 November would also run. In January 2024, the state finally handed over a funding decision amounting to 8.7 million euros. This also includes the renovation of the siding to the tank farm and the construction of a timber loading terminal.

== Route ==
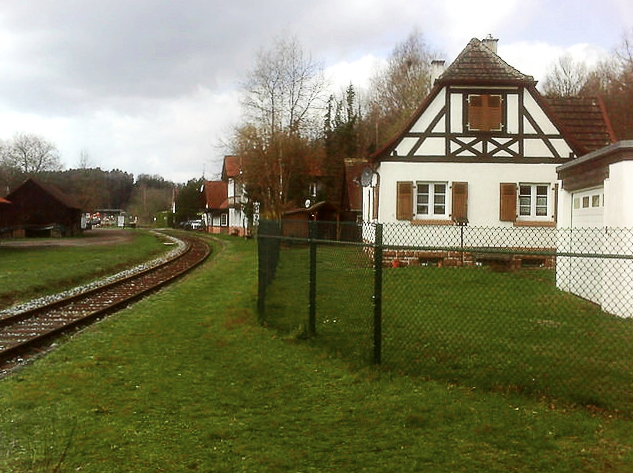
The route near Busenberg-Schindhard

The line branches off from the Landau-Rohrbach line at Hinterweidenthal Ost station. Immediately after the exit points, it is owned by AVG. Initially, the railway, which loses height in this area, runs parallel to the main line and the B10 federal highway before crossing under the latter and reaching the settlement area of the local community of Hinterweidenthal. From there, it follows the eponymous Wieslauter, which it crosses several times along with some of its tributaries. Federal highway 427 runs almost parallel to it until Dahn, where there are sidings and a former siding to a nearby former tank farm.

The line then passes the ruins of Neudahn Castle; the Moosbachtal stop is located in this area. The Jungfernsprung is located near Dahn station. After the Busenberg-Schindhard stop, there is a major right-hand bend; the valley becomes increasingly wider there. After around 15 kilometres, it reaches the terminus at Bundenthal-Rumbach.

== Traffic ==
=== Passenger traffic ===
==== Time of the Bavarian State Railways and the German Reichsbahn ====
The first timetable listed a total of four train pairs. Three years later, two more were added on weekdays. One of them terminated in Busenberg-Schindhard. At weekends, the train service was usually somewhat more varied. In 1914, for example, eight pairs ran on Sundays and public holidays, one of which was connected through to Landau. After the outbreak of the First World War, the service was reduced somewhat.

The French military's direct operation in 1923 and 1924 led to a deterioration in the service. Whereas a journey from Hinterweidenthal to Bundenthal-Rumbach had previously taken 40 minutes, this increased the journey time to 50 minutes. In addition, the service was limited to four pairs of trains on weekdays and three on weekends; there was no special train for excursionists during this time.

In 1931, there were twice as many trains on Sundays as on other days of the week. One train only ran between Hinterweidenthal and Dahn. There was also an excursion train – unofficially called the "Bundenthaler" – which started in Neustadt in the morning and returned in the evening. The Reichsbahn initially had plans to cancel the "Bundenthaler" for the 1932/33 winter timetable. However, public protest against this plan was so great that it was abandoned. During the Third Reich, another pair of trains was added. As the line was located within the Red Zone, there was initially no passenger traffic after the outbreak of the Second World War; between 1940 and 1944 there were five pairs of trains a day. Due to the war, the journey times were extended again.

==== Post-war period and German Federal Railways ====
From the beginning of 1946, there were two pairs of trains. On Sundays there was an additional connection to Bundenthal. A morning train ran exclusively by special arrangement. As a curiosity, there was a connection on weekdays that started in Godramstein and thus beyond a railroad junction. In the mid-1950s, the line had the busiest passenger service in its history: A total of eight pairs ran between Hinterweidenthal and Bundenthal-Rumbach on weekdays, and another one on Sundays. The "Bundenthaler" was reactivated in 1951 and was already running from Ludwigshafen during this time. It followed the Mannheim-Saarbrücken line as far as Neustadt, then changed direction to Landau on the Maximiliansbahn and then to Hinterweidenthal on the Landau-Rohrbach line. This excursion train was very busy. It served all stops en route to Landau and ran as an express train to Hinterweidenthal; accordingly, it only stopped in Albersweiler, Annweiler and Wilgartswiesen on this section.

In 1965, a year before regular passenger services were discontinued, three pairs of trains ran Monday to Friday, while the Bundenthaler remained the only train on Sundays. The latter, which despite its name only ran as far as Dahn, also came to an end in May 1976. To get to Bundenthal anyway, passengers had to change at Dahn station to an unnamed excursion train from Saarbrücken. The timetable for both trains was coordinated accordingly.

==== Since the reactivation ====
In the first years after the reactivation of passenger transport on Sundays and public holidays in 1997, two pairs of trains ran, the number of which later increased to four.

Scheduled local rail passenger services are operated as RB 56 (KVV and DB designation, VRN line number RB 57) on Wednesdays, weekends and public holidays from May to October. The service soon increased to five train pairs daily. In the approach to Hinterweidenthal, a scheduled regional train on the Landau – Hinterweidenthal Ost section is reinforced by a second unit and split again in Hinterweidenthal Ost (dividing). The front unit continued to Pirmasens and the rear unit to Bundenthal-Rumbach. On Saturdays and Sundays, a regional express ran as the Felsenland Express from Karlsruhe to Bundenthal-Rumbach and back, after having commuted several times between Bundenthal and Hinterweidenthal Ost.

=== Freight traffic ===
The regional timber industry in particular was an important pillar of freight transport. In the 1960s, the average number of wagons per day was 5.6 tons, although this was already limited to the required minimum at that time. A decade earlier, a siding to a neighboring NATO fuel depot was built between Hinterweidenthal Ort and Dahn stations at line kilometer 3.78. As a result, heavy tank wagon trains, for which a separate diesel locomotive was responsible, ran regularly on the northern section of the line. Freight traffic figures declined continuously after the Second World War: while 8495 tons of general cargo were received along the route in 1972, ten years later the figure was only 3750 tons. The picture was the same for shipments: 61,205 tons in 1972 compared to 6875 tons. After the end of the Cold War, the United States Army gave up the tank farm and a military site near Fischbach in 1992. As a result, the line lost its strategic importance.

After the Second World War, freight traffic was initially routed via Neustadt and Landau. After the dissolution of the Mainz Federal Railway Directorate in 1971, it was handled via Pirmasens, which, like the Wieslauter line, was henceforth under the Saarbrücken Directorate, while Landau and Neustadt were under the Karlsruhe Directorate. The last timber transports took place in the summer of 1987. When freight traffic was discontinued in 1995, there was an occasional transfer journey at around ten o'clock.

Nevertheless, there was another transport on the line in March 1998. The reason for this was that the Althoff circus was setting up in the Dahn district of Reichenbach for a few days. As all freight traffic in the region had already declined significantly, this posed a major logistical challenge. Nevertheless, it was possible to procure a diesel locomotive and a special freight wagon to transport the elephants to the Busenberg-Schindhard station.

== Vehicle deployment ==
=== Steam locomotives ===
Initially, steam locomotives of the T 4.I series were used on the line, which handled both passenger and freight traffic. As the T 4.IIs were stationed at the Landau depot, which had been in existence since 1920, they presumably also reached the Wieslautertal. From the end of the 1920s, class 64 locomotives were largely responsible before they were replaced by class 86 locomotives. The DR and DB used the class 50 for freight traffic.

=== Diesel vehicles ===
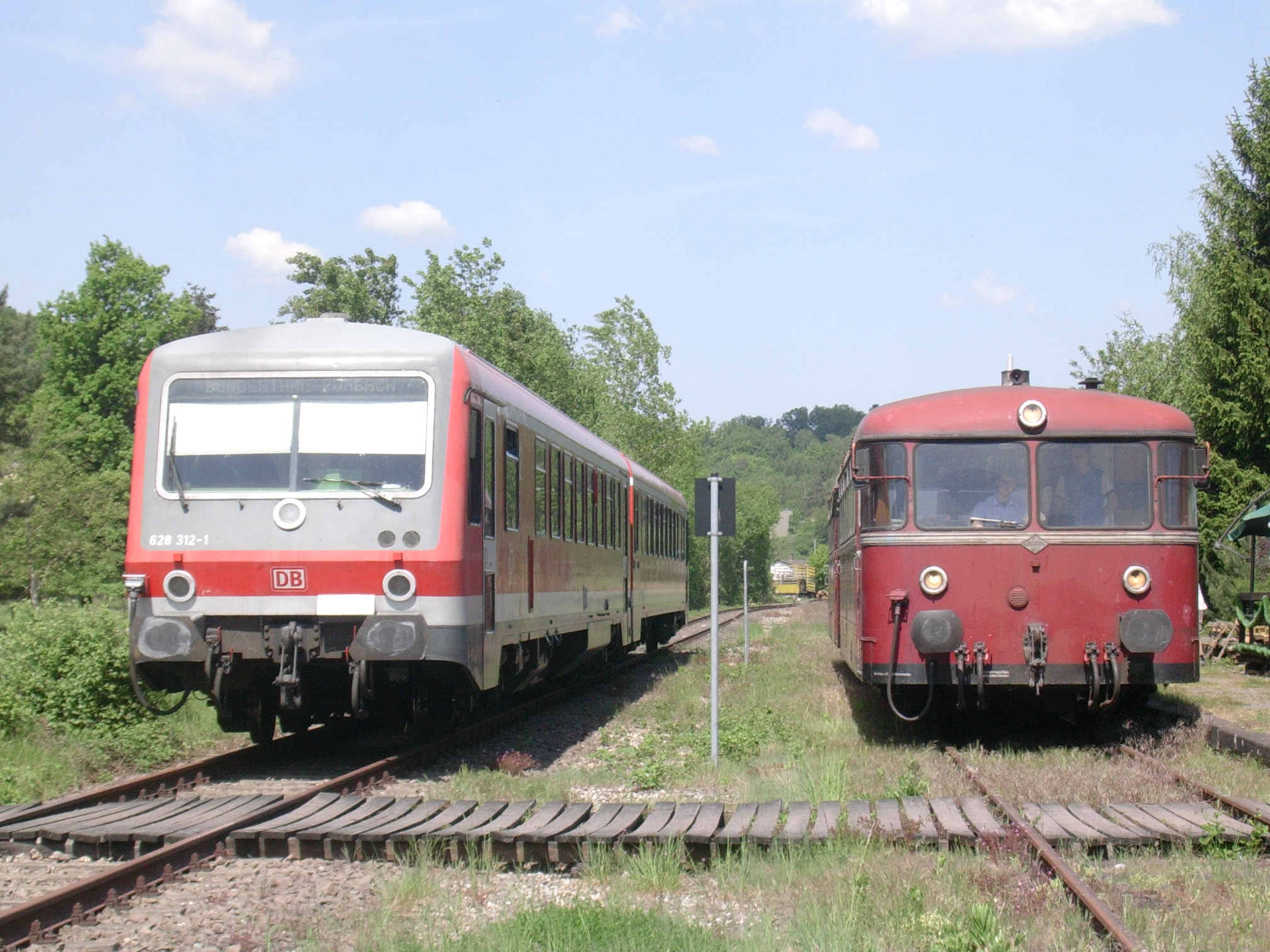
Railcars of the 628 and 798 series (Uerdingen rail bus) in Bundenthal-Rumbach (2007)

From the mid-1950s until the temporary discontinuation of passenger services, mainly Uerdingen rail buses of the VT 95 and VT 98 series took over the passenger services. From the 1970s, special trains were pulled by class 218 diesel locomotives.

From the mid-1960s, class 211 and 212 diesel locomotives carried the freight traffic, initially from Landau and from 1971 from Kaiserslautern. The V 160 series was also used here.

== Operating centers ==
=== Hinterweidenthal East ===
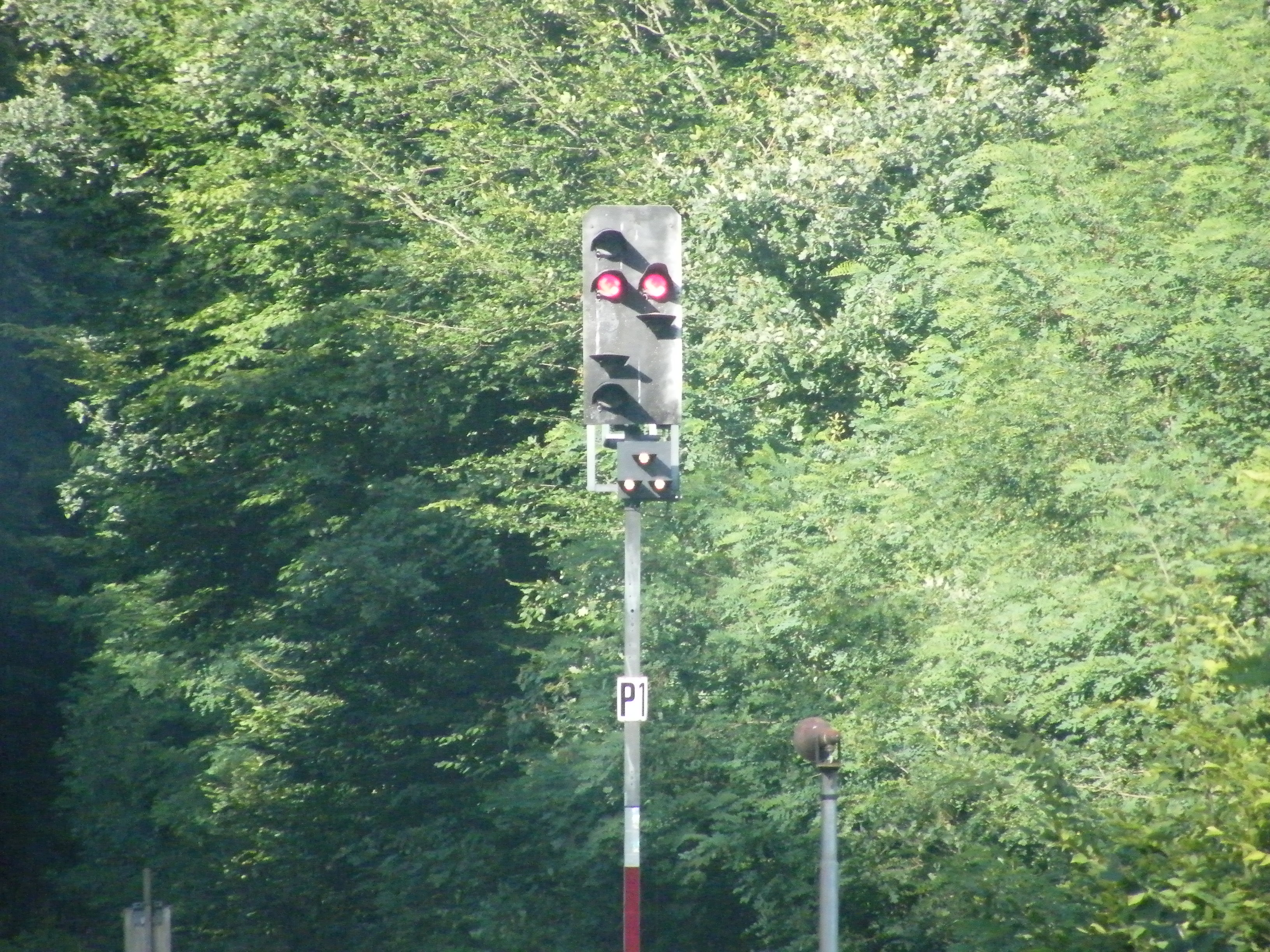
Replacement signal at the station

Hinterweidenthal Ost station, which has since been greatly reduced in size, is located around two kilometers north-east of the settlement area of the local community of Hinterweidenthal and was called Kaltenbach Ost in its first years of operation. It was only built in the course of the construction of the Wieslauterbahn and was used exclusively for changing to the Landau-Rohrbach line. In its early days, express trains also stopped at this station along the main line. It was later given the name Hinterweidenthal, and since the resumption of passenger services to Bundenthal-Rumbach it has been known as Hinterweidenthal Ost.

It already had a platform tunnel when it was built. It also had a total of six tracks. These included one passing siding and four stabling sidings.

The Wieslauterbahn trains start at its main platform (track 1). Trains on the main line only stop at the station during the operating hours of the Wieslauterbahn, as it is used exclusively for changing to the connecting line due to its remote location.

=== Hinterweidenthal Place ===
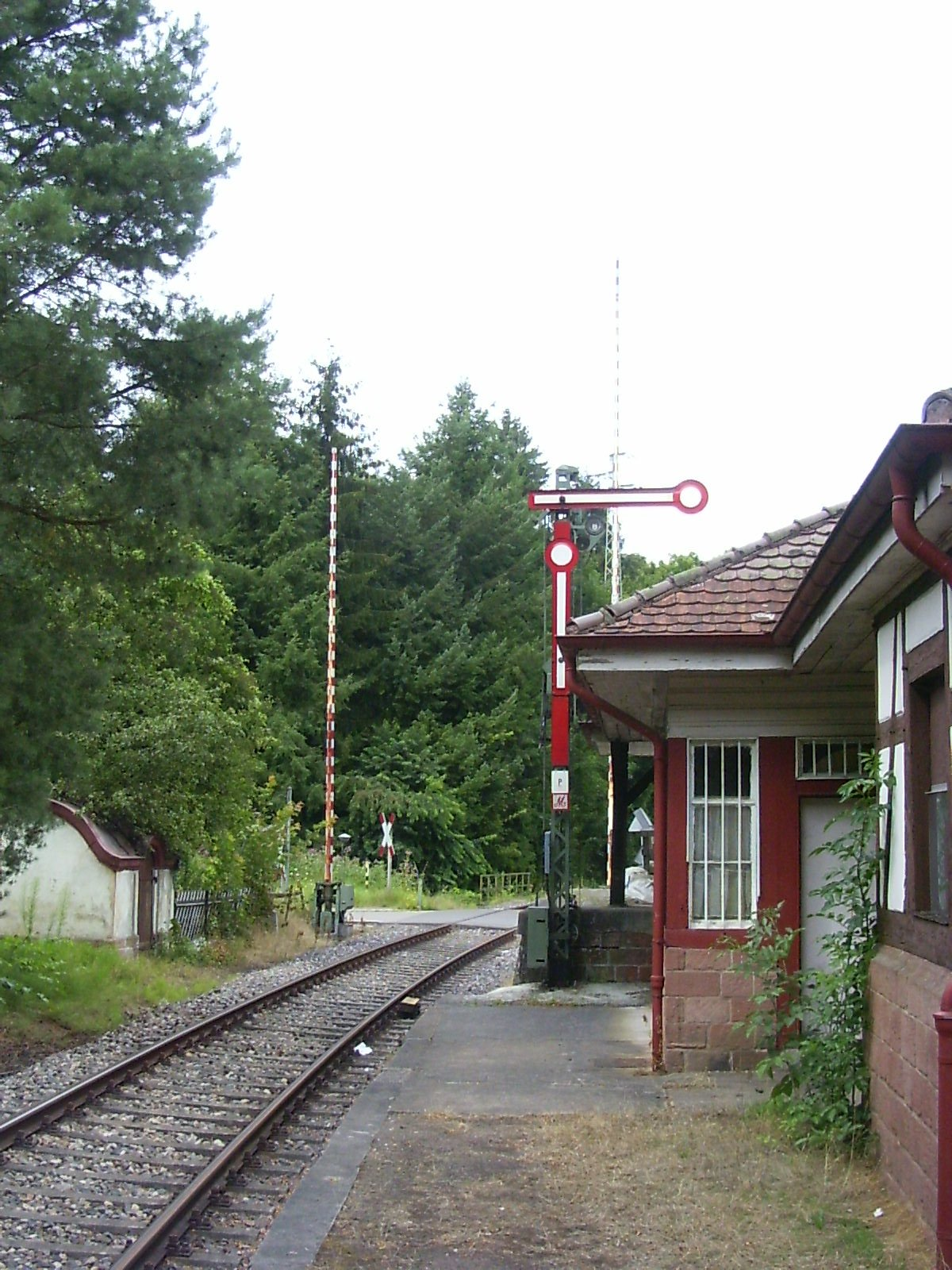
Station Hinterweidenthal Ort

Hinterweidenthal Ort station is located on the north-western edge of Hinterweidenthal. In the first few years of its existence, it was simply called Hinterweidenthal. It was only after the starting point of the railway had been given this name that the addition "Ort" was added.

It was once of great importance as a timber loading point. The tracks required for this have since been dismantled, apart from one loading track. The most important freight customer at the station was the West Palatinate timber industry, for which one of the two sidings was responsible. In the 1980s, the station still had a loading track including a loading ramp, two sidings and mechanical signals. The latter were dismantled in 1989. The station building is a listed building. It no longer has any significance for rail operations and has not been used for any other purpose since then.

In addition, the station formed the freight tariff point for the one and a half kilometer southern alternative connection point to a neighbouring NATO tank farm.

=== Dahn ===
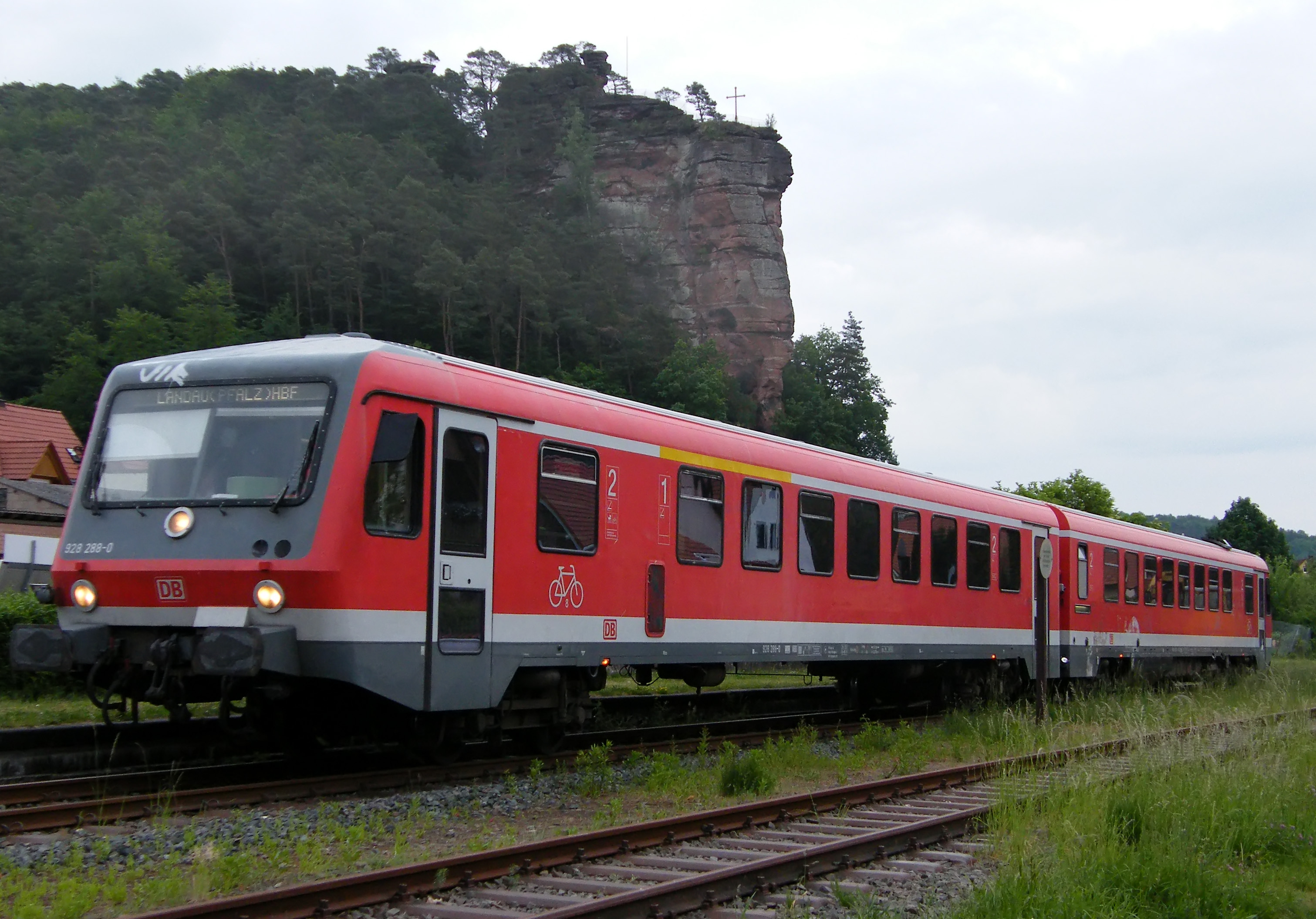
Regional train to Landau at Dahn station (2008)

Dahn station is the only stop where trains can still cross today. Only the eastern of the two tracks has a platform. It was at its most important at the end of the 1930s. In freight traffic, the station mainly received building materials and fuels. Major local freight customers were the Frank chip basket factory and the Raiffeisen cooperative. The former was served until freight transport on the line was discontinued. In March 1945, the station building fell victim to an air raid during the fighting of the Second World War. Its successor was inaugurated in 1959. Its demolition is planned in a few years' time as part of the construction of a bypass.

Until the 1950s, it was still an island station, as it comprised a siding with three ramps that surrounded both the station building and the goods shed. It later became two stub tracks, which were dismantled in 1997. It originally had a mechanical signal box, which the Deutsche Bundesbahn dismantled in 1978.

=== Dahn South ===
The Dahn Süd stop is located on the south-western outskirts of Dahn. It was built in 1956 as it is closer to the town center than Dahn station. With a platform length of 60 m, type 642 diesel railcars running in double traction cannot call at the stop.

=== Busenberg-Schindhard ===
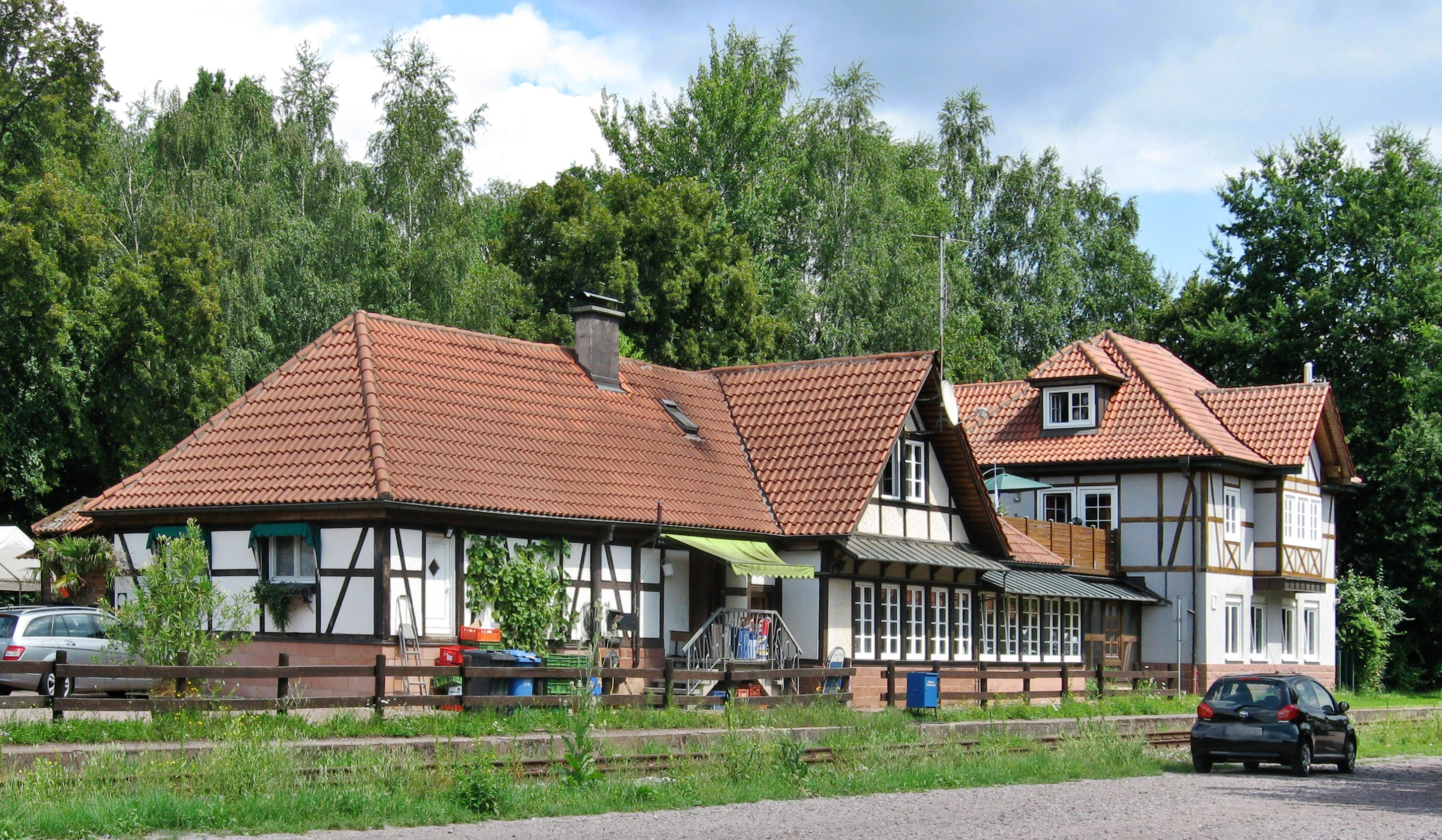
Busenberg-Schindhard stop (2010)

Busenberg-Schindhard also used to be a railway station before it was converted into a stop. It is not located in the district of one of the two eponymous communities a few kilometers away, but in that of Dahn, near the district of Reichenbach. It was given its name because it mainly served these communities and Erfweiler. In the past, it was therefore often unofficially referred to as Reichenbach.

From the 1930s, it had a signal box, which has since been converted into a vacation home. A carpenter also acquired the dilapidated former station building in 1983. He converted it into a restaurant. In 1998 it was given an extension and two years later the outside area was changed.

The staff were withdrawn in 1967, but the station still had a siding in the 1980s.There are future plans to build a new platform in a different position and abandon the existing one.

=== Bruchweiler ===
The Bruchweiler stop (also known as Bruchweiler-Bärenbach) is located at the entrance to Bruchweiler-Bärenbach. It was also formerly a station that was converted back into a stopping point as part of rationalization measures. However, it never had a station building, only a waiting shelter. In the 1950s, tickets were sold by a local greengrocer.

=== Bundenthal-Rumbach ===
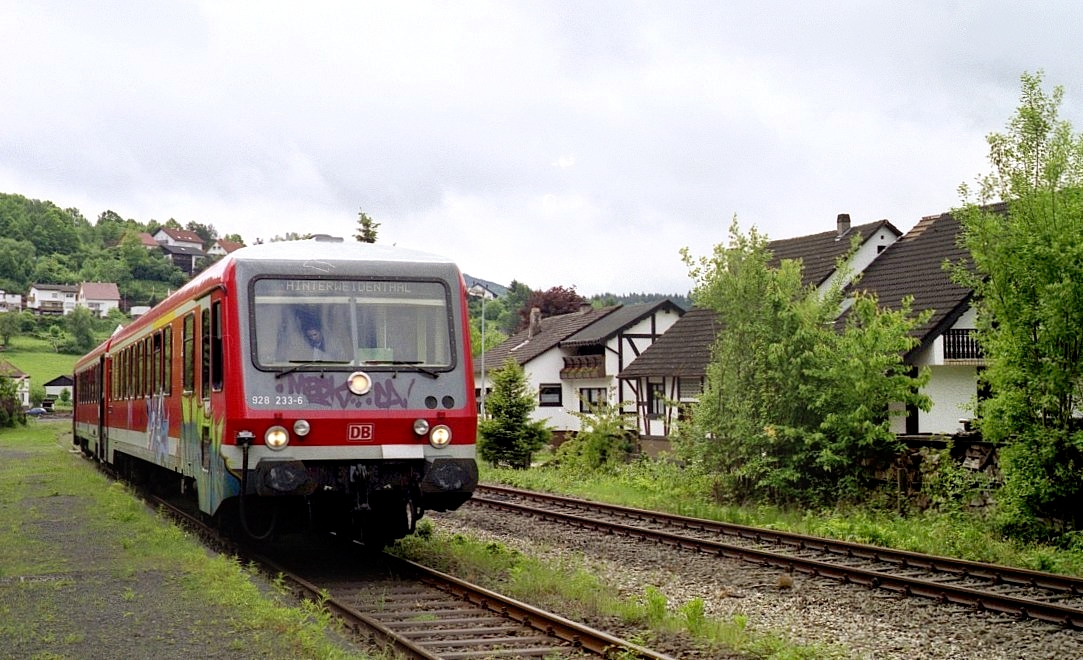
Train at Bundenthal-Rumbach station

Bundenthal-Rumbach station – sometimes also called Bundenthal – is a terminus station and also the end station of the Wieslauterbahn. It is located on the northern edge of the village of Bundenthal. It had a half-timbered locomotive shed that no longer exists. Initially, it had three regular tracks and a siding in front of the station building. The tracks were later reconstructed so that, in addition to two bypass tracks in the northern station area, there was also a siding. Only one of the former still exists today.

From 1921 to 1930, the narrow-gauge Wasgauwaldbahn line to Ludwigswinkel began here, the tracks of which were located to the west of the standard-gauge line. After the closure of passenger services, the Deutsche Bundesbahn planned to demolish all the buildings at the beginning of the 1970s. However, on the initiative of two entrepreneurs from the region, the association Fördergemeinschaft Wasgau e. V. was formed in 1972 to prevent these measures. While the goods shed was removed before the association was founded, the station building was saved. In the same year, the association acquired a Dillinger Hütte works locomotive built by Škoda in 1941, which stands as a monument on the station forecourt.

== Future plans ==
Although the introduction of regular train connections has been discussed time and again, especially in rush-hour traffic, it was not included in the tender for the Palatinate network for commissioning on 10 December 2023. Until the timetable change in June 2037, only seasonal trains on the RB 56 will therefore continue to be put out to tender.

In freight transport, there are repeated considerations to activate the siding at the former Busenberg-Schindhard station for the shipment of round timber, for which, however, a suitable loading area would have to be created. This could result in a modal shift from road to rail.

== Accidents ==
In October 1958, a truck was hit by a freight train at the Dahn Süd stop.

== Literature ==
- Fritz Engbarth (2011). "100 Jahre Eisenbahnen im Wieslautertal" (PDF). Archived from the original (PDF; 2,7 MB) on 2016-01-27.
- Klaus D. Holzborn (1993), Eisenbahn-Reviere Pfalz, Berlin: transpress, ISBN 3-344-70790-6
- Karl Kissel (1999), Dahn- eine Chronik, Dahn: Stadt Dahn, pp. 286–296, ISBN 3-00-002205-8
- Reiner Schedler (1998), Wolf-Dietger Machel (ed.), "Neben- und Schmalspurbahnen in Deutschland einst und jetzt", Neben- und Schmalspurbahnen in Deutschland (Einst & jetzt) (Von Rügen bis Rosenheim, von Aachen bis Zwickau), GeraNova Zeitschriftenverlag
- Heinz Sturm (2005), Die pfälzischen Eisenbahnen, Veröffentlichungen der Pfälzischen Gesellschaft zur Förderung der Wissenschaften, 53, Ludwigshafen am Rhein: pro MESSAGE, pp. 240–241 und S. 249, ISBN 3-934845-26-6
