= Hinterweidenthal Ost station =

Railway station in Hinterweidenthal, Germany

Hinterweidenthal Ost
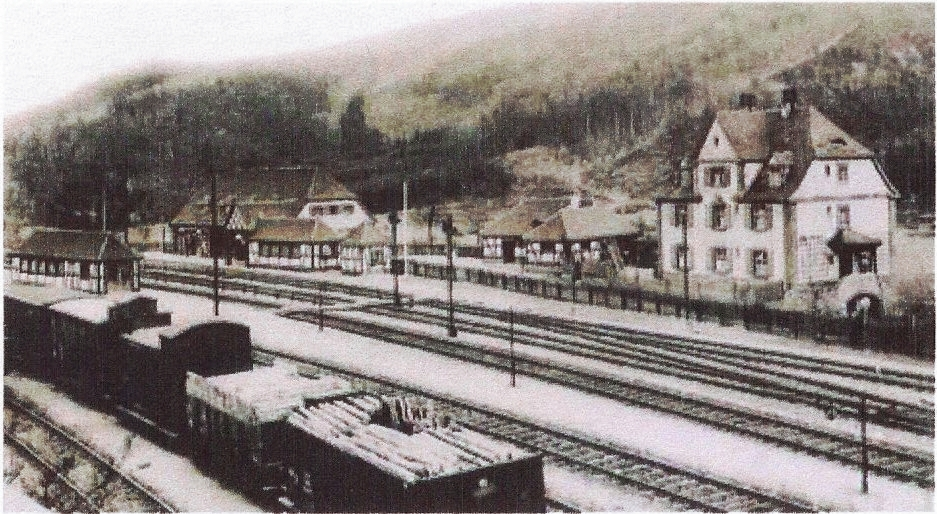
- Hinterweidenthal Ost station, then Kaltenbach Ost, 1911

General information
- Location: Kaltenbach 15, Hinterweidenthal, Rhineland-Palatinate; Germany
- Coordinates: 49°12′11″N 7°46′23″E
- Lines: Landau–Rohrbach (km 56.14); Wieslauter Railway (km 0.00)
- Platforms: 2 (formerly 3)

Construction
- Accessible: Platform 1 only

Other information
- Station code: 2780
- DS100 code: SHW
- IBNR: 8079147
- Category: 6
- Fare zone: VRN: 998
- Website: www.bahnhof.de

History
- Opened: 1 December 1911
- Former names: Kaltenbach Ost; Hinterweidenthal
Location

Hinterweidenthal Ost station (originally called Kaltenbach Ost and later called Hinterweidenthal until 1970) is one of a total of three stations in the municipality of Hinterweidenthal in the German state of Rhineland-Palatinate. Deutsche Bahn classifies it as a category 6 station and it has two platform tracks. The station is located in the network of the Verkehrsverbund Rhein-Neckar (Rhine-Neckar transport association, VRN) and belongs to fare zone 998.

It was opened in 1911 as a junction station for the newly built Wieslauter Railway to Bundenthal. Its importance has always been as an interchange station between the latter and the Landau–Rohrbach railway, which has existed in its present form since 1895. After passenger services were abandoned at the station, it functioned exclusively as a depot for railway operations and as a freight yard. After traffic on the Wieslauter line was reactivated on weekends in 1997, it has again been served by passenger trains, but only in order for passengers to change trains to and from the main line. Therefore it is only served when the branch line is operating. Its address is Kaltenbach 15.

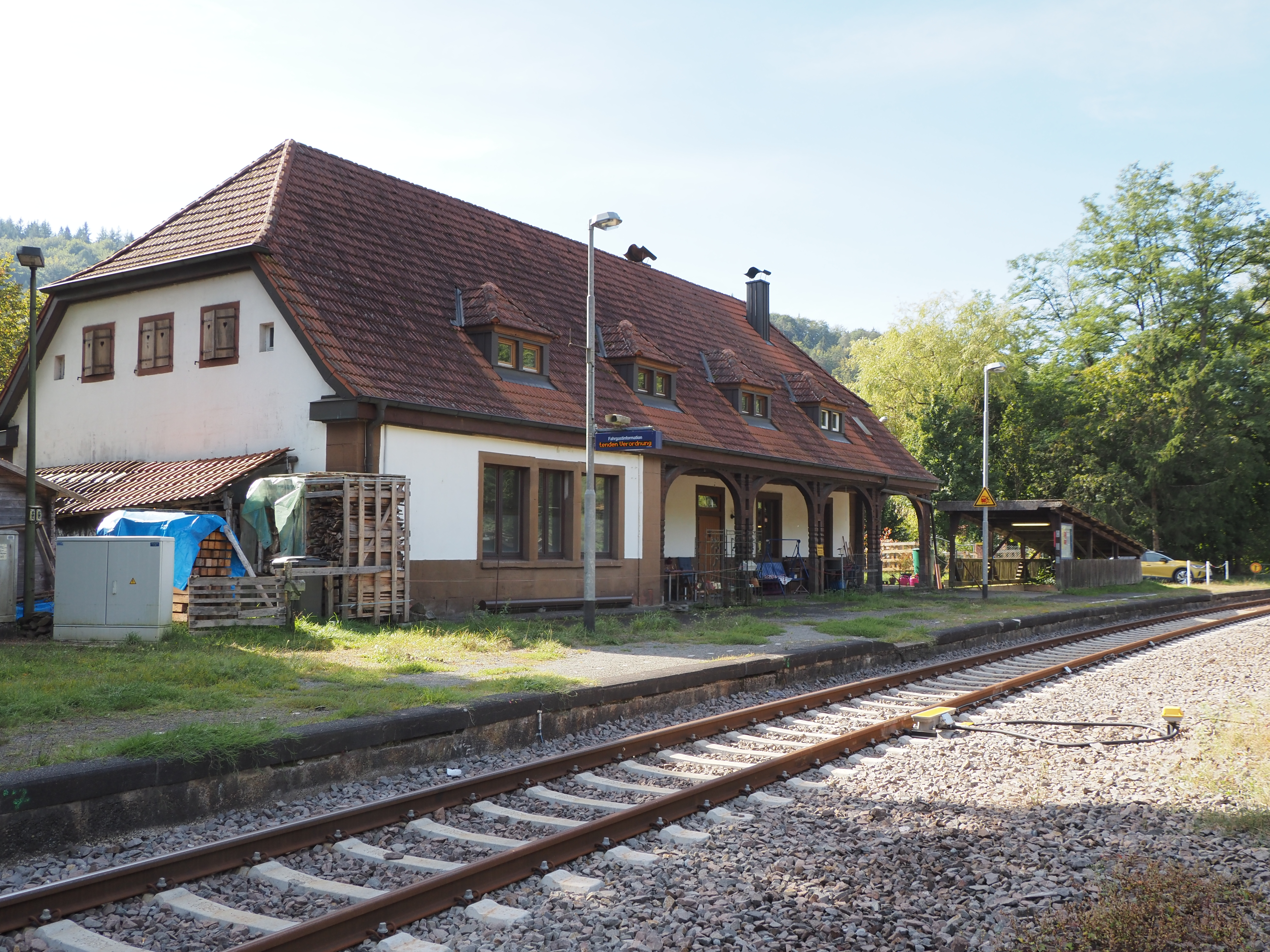
Hinterweidenthal Ost station

== Location ==
The station is located about two kilometres northeast of the built-up area of Hinterweidenthal. The Landau–Rohrbach railway runs in this area from the east-northeast to the west. The Wieslauter Railway branches off parallel to this, but it runs down a slope to the lower valley of the Lauter. Federal highway 10 and the neighbouring Horbach stream also run parallel to both lines.

== History ==
During the building of the South Palatinate Railway (Südpfalzbahn, now the Landau–Rohrbach railway), a railway station was built in the heights of the hamlet of Kaltenbach, which at that time was in the municipality of Wilgartswiesen. Due to its importance for the nearby municipality of Hinterweidenthal, the station was designated as Hinterweidenthal-Kaltenbach.

In the meantime, plans were made to build a railway line in the Wieslauter valley. While some plans intended that such a line would connect to the main line at Kaltenbach, there was also support for the extension of the Winden–Bad Bergzabern railway, which was opened to Dahn in 1870. On the Bavarian side, there were plans for a line from Wissembourg (which had been part of Germany since 1870 and called Weißenburg) via Dahn and Lemberg to Pirmasens. Since this proved to be too expensive, the decision was taken to build a branch line. The station in Kaltenbach was found to be unsuitable for a junction because of its unfavourable topographical situation and as a result a new station was built two kilometres east of it, originally under the name of Kaltenbach Ost (east) at the junction to the branch line. The latter was opened together with the Wieslauterbahn (Wieslauter Railway) to Bundenthal-Rumbach on 1 December 1911. The opening train left the station at nine o'clock in the morning.

During this time, the railway station was managed by the Zweibrücken operations and construction inspectorate and its tracks were part of the responsibility of the Bahnmeisterei (track master's office) of Kaltenbach. As early as 1914, it was renamed Hinterweidenthal, while the station in the south of the municipality of Hinterweidenthal was named Hinterweidenthal Ort (place).

It became part of the area of the Reichsbahndirektion (Reichsbahn railway division) of Ludwigshafen after the founding of the Deutsche Reichsbahn in 1922. A year later, the railway workers employed at the railway station were expelled during the operation of the railway by the French military during the occupation of the Palatinate by France. They then returned to work. In 1935, the Reichsbahn equipped the train station with a signal box from the Bruchsal company and new signal technology. During the dissolution of the railway division of Ludwigshafen, it was transferred to the railway division of Mainz on 1 April 1937 and the Betriebsamtes (RBA) Zweibrücken (operations office of Zweibrücken).

=== Further development ===
Deutsche Bundesbahn (DB), which was responsible for railway operations from 1949, assigned the station to the railway division of Mainz, which was assigned all railway lines within the newly created state of Rhineland-Palatinate. Regular passenger traffic on the Wieslauter Railway was discontinued on 24 September 1966. The excursion train which ran on Sundays and public holidays, the Bundenthaler, remained as a concession to the local population who had vehemently protested against the decommissioning for the time being. The station was renamed again on 27 September 1970, this time as Hinterweidenthal Ost (east). Since then the station in Kaltenbach has been called Hinterweidenthal. The names of Hinterweidenthal Betriebsbahnhof (Hinterweidenthal operations station) or Rangierbahnhof ´Hinterweidenthal (Hinterweidenthal marshalling yard) are also sometimes used. In the course of the gradual dissolution of the railway division of Mainz from 1 August 1971, its counterpart in Saarbrücken took responsibility for the station. The Bundenthaler also stopped running in May 1976.

Freight traffic ended on the Wieslauter Railway in 1995. Two years later the passenger traffic was reactivated on the weekend. Since then, trains have stopped at the station again. However, Hinterweidenthal Ost station is not served except during the times when the Wieslauter Railway operates. In 2000, the station became part of the Westpfalz-Verkehrsverbund (Western Palatinate transport association, WVV) along with the rest of the Western Palatinate; in addition, the tariff of the Verkehrsverbund Rhein-Neckar (Rhine-Neckar transport association, VRN) was extended to the Dahn/Hauenstein/Hinterweidenthal area. In 2006, the WVV was absorbed by the VRN. Two turnouts in the station were renewed in October 2003; consequently rail traffic on the Wilgartswiesen–Münchweiler section was blockaded during this work. In April 2010, the same work was carried out on the main track, so all trains had to use the refuge track.

== Infrastructure ==
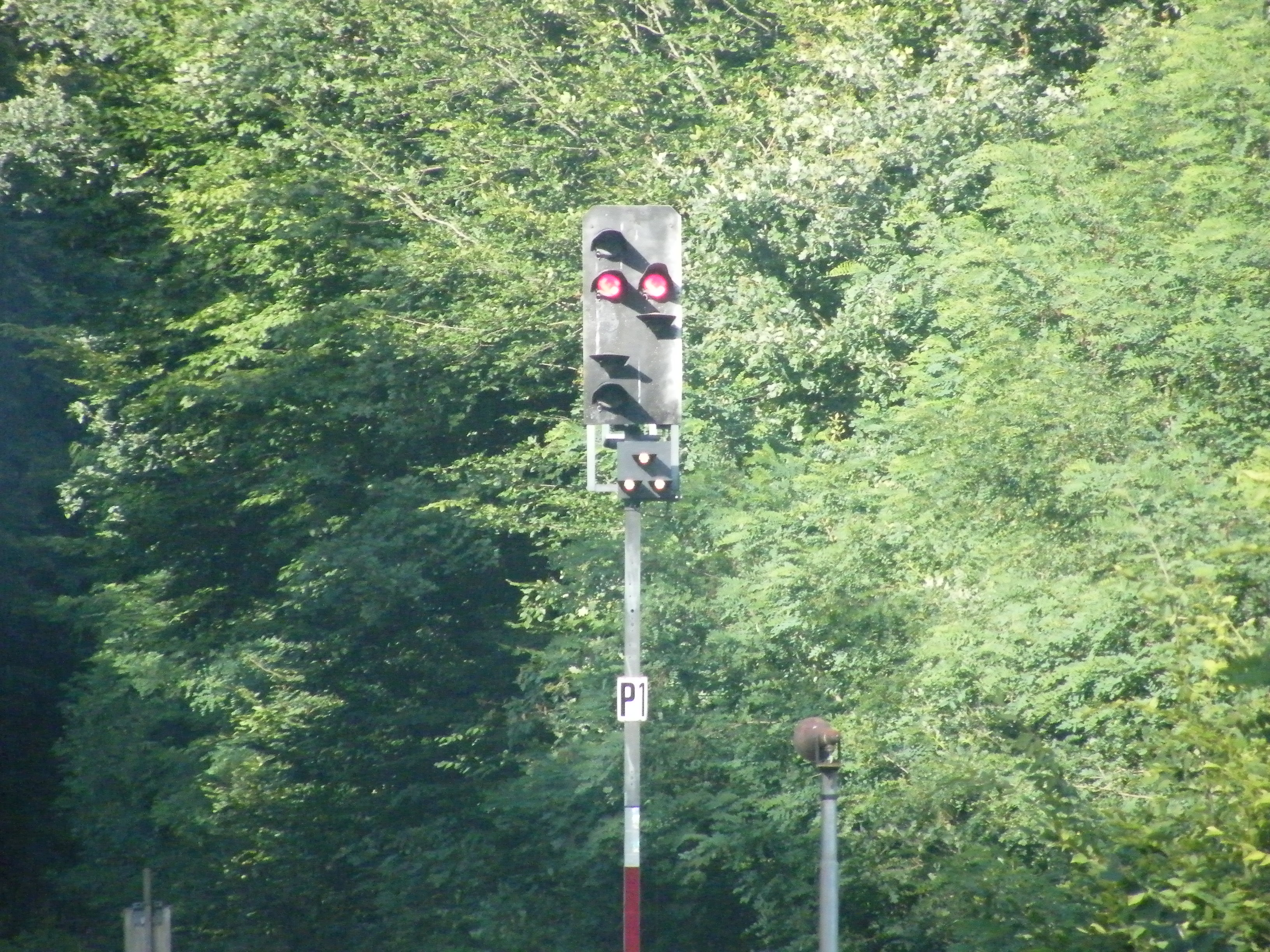
Substitute signal in the station

=== Entrance building ===
Since the station was only built during the construction of the Wieslauter Railway, the entrance building differs stylistically from its counterparts at the other stations between Landau and Zweibrücken. It is side-gabled relative to the tracks and has a mansard roof as well as four dormer windows on the trackside. Already during its construction, it received a pedestrian subway, which still exists today despite the dismantling of most of the tracks.

=== Signal boxes ===
The station had two signal boxes, one in the eastern part of the station and one in the west. Meanwhile, they have been taken out of use. Since the 1990s, the signalling at the station has been controlled from Hinterweidenthal station, two kilometres west on the line from Landau to Rohrbach by means of a relay interlocking of the Sp Dr S60 class.

=== Tracks ===
The station initially had a total of six tracks. Among them were an overtaking track and four sidings. As a result of the abandonment of freight traffic in the mid-1990s, four of the six tracks were subsequently dismantled. Previously, the station had been primarily used to store freight wagons that were no longer required. Originally, it had semaphore signals, but these have been replaced by light signals.

== Operations ==
=== Passenger services ===
Four train pairs were listed as running over the Wieslauter Railway each day in the first timetable. Due to its function as a railway junction, it was also a stop for express trains on the main line. In 1914, a pair of trains ran between Landau and Bundenthal-Rumbach, the predecessor of the later Bundenthaler excursion train. Moreover, in the morning a train continued to Munich and a through coach that had already run from Paris continued to Salzburg.

On weekends, the services offered by the Wieslauter Railway were generally somewhat greater in the following decades. The Bundenthaler started in Ludwigshafen in the 1930s. During the Second World War, services on the Wieslauter Railway were discontinued from time to time, since it was within the Roten (red) zone (the militarised zone near the French border). There were trains on the main line at that time that sometimes ran only between Landau and Hinterweidenthal or between Pirmasens Nord and Hinterweidenthal. In the 1950s, a train ran between Landau and Hinterweidenthal as an express, serving only the stations of Landau West, Albersweiler, Annweiler am Trifels and Wilgartswiesen. On the rest of its route, it served all stations. At the same time, the station and the other minor stations on the line were served by long-distance services on the Munich–Saarbrücken route. Local trains often stopped at the station for around ten minutes. As a curiosity, in the last years before its cessation, the Bundenthaler terminated, despite its name, in Dahn, where the passengers had to change to a train running to Bundenthal-Rumbach from Saarbrücken, also running only on Sundays.

In the first years after the reactivation of passenger services on the Wieslauter Railway on Sundays and public holidays in 1997, two pairs of trains operated, which were later increased to four. When the Bundenthaler was reactivated, it initially only operated from Neustadt. A few years later, its run was extended eastward to Mannheim. The train has since been divided in Hinterweidenthal Ost station; while one portion continues to Bundenthal-Rumbach, the other portion runs to Pirmasenser Hauptbahnhof. Trains of the Landau–Rohrbach railway only stop at the station at times when services run on the branch line.

=== Freight operations ===
A class I shunting locomotive was stationed in the station for freight operations before the Second World War. Since the station was assigned to the Saarbrücken railway division in 1971, the freight traffic was served from Pirmasens Nord, which meant that freight trains had to reverse at the station to run on the Wieslauter Railway. Previously, freight traffic was served from Landau. The only exceptions were the tanker trains to the Hinterweidenthal tank farm, which ran from Karlsruhe via Landau. From the end of the 1980s, the local railway was increasingly rarely served and freight trains now run only to Hinterweidenthal Ort.

== Sources ==
=== References ===
- Engbarth, Fritz (2011). 100 Jahre Eisenbahnen im Wieslautertal [100 years of railways in Wieslauter Valley] (PDF) (in German). Archived from the original (PDF) on 23 March 2017.
- Engbarth, Fritz (2007). Von der Ludwigsbahn zum Integralen Taktfahrplan – 160 Jahre Eisenbahn in der Pfalz [From the Ludwig Railway to the Integral Timetable—160 years of Railways in the Palatinate] (in German).
- Fiegenbaum, Wolfgang; Klee, Wolfgang (2001). Rückkehr zur Schiene – Reaktivierte und neue Strecken im Personenverkehr 1980–2001 [Return to rail – Re-activated and new lines in passenger transport 1980–2001] (in German). ISBN 978-3613711853.
- Holzborn, Klaus D. (1993). Eisenbahn-Reviere Pfalz [Palatine Railway District] (in German). Berlin: transpress. pp. 57–91. ISBN 3-344-70790-6.
- Mühl, Albert (1982). Die Pfalzbahn. Geschichte, Betrieb und Fahrzeuge der Pfälzischen Eisenbahnen [The Palatine Railway. History, Operations and Rollingstock of the Palatine Railways] (in German). Stuttgart: Theiss Verlag. ISBN 3-8062-0301-6.
- Sturm, Heinz (2005). Die pfälzischen Eisenbahnen [The Palatine Railways] (in German). Ludwigshafen am Rhein: pro MESSAGE. ISBN 3-934845-26-6.
