= Bichtenberg =

- Location within Rhineland-Palatinate

Highest point
- Elevation: 400 m (1,300 ft)
- Coordinates: 49°09′35″N 7°43′30″E

Geography
- Location: Rhineland-Palatinate, Germany
- Parent range: Palatine Forest

Geology
- Rock type: Bunter sandstone

The Bichtenberg is a 400-metre-high hill in the western Wasgau, a region on the Franco-German border that includes the southern part of the Palatine Forest and the northern part of the Vosges. Its northwestern flank is in the parish of Lemberg, its southwestern flank in the parish of Dahn. To the north is the Lemberg hamlet of Salzwoog. Three kilometres west lies the Salzwoog Devil's Table.

The Bichteberg, which is made of bunter sandstone is entirely covered in mixed forest crossed by several tracks and forest roads. One route to the summit is also suitable for mountain bikes.
