= Dillinger Hütte =

German steel fabricator

AG der Dillinger Hüttenwerke

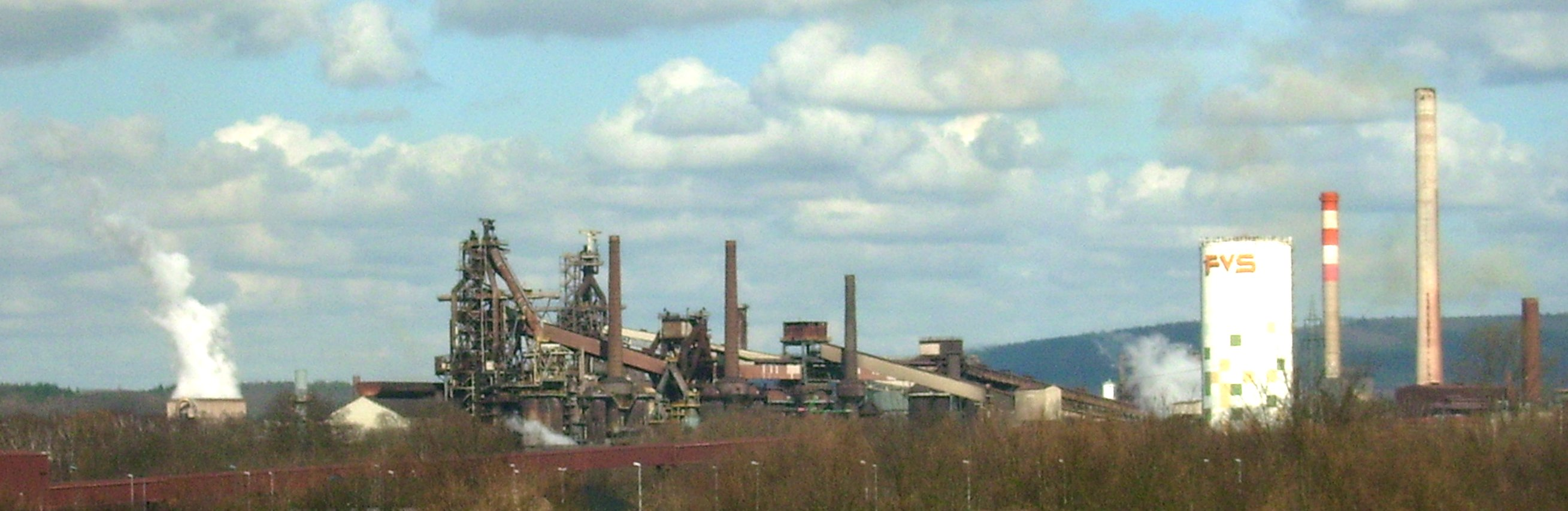
- Type: Joint-stock company (Aktiengesellschaft)
- Industry: Steel industry
- Founded: 1809; 217 years ago
- Headquarters: Dillingen, Germany
- Key people: Stefan Rauber (chairman of the board)
- Revenue: 2,161 Bln. EUR (2009)
- Total assets: 2,768 Bln. EUR (2009) (balance sheet total)
- Number of employees: 5,296 (December 31, 2009)
- Website: [ www.dillinger.de/d/en/]]

Dillinger Hütte is a steel producer in Dillingen, in the German Federal State of Saarland, and has a history stretching back more than three hundred years. The plant was founded in 1685, and was Germany's first Aktiengesellschaft, or joint stock company (1809).

The first continuous-caster for slabs in the world was commissioned in Dillingen in 1962. A further machine, permitting casting of slabs of up to 400 mm in thickness – the thickest produced anywhere in the world at that time – was added, along with other new facilities, in 1998. In 2010, Dillinger Hütte successfully produced the first 450 mm thick slab – another world record. The principal equipment in the rolling mill now takes the form of two four-high stands, of which one is currently the largest in the world, with an effective rolling width of 5.5 m and a rolling pressure of 110 MN.

== Facilities ==
The Dillinger Hütte group also includes a further rolling mill operated by GTS Industries in Dunkirk (France). The group's parent company is DHS Holding, which owns 95.28% of the shares in the operating company, AG der Dillinger Hütte. Another 4.72% are held in free float. The company's products are marketed under the Dillinger Hütte GTS trade name.

The shares in DHS Holding are owned 33.4% by the international ArcelorMittal steel group, with 33.75% held by Saarstahl AG and 15.00% by Struktur-Holding-Stahl. Reciprocal part-ownership exists with Saarstahl AG, in which Dillinger Hütte holds 25.10%. Dillinger Hütte also owns 50% of the ROGESA Roheisengesellschaft iron smelting company, whose blast furnaces, located on the Dillinger Hütte plant site, produce inter alia the "hot metal" (liquid pig iron) required for steel production. ROGESA itself also has a stake in the ZKS Zentralkokerei Saar coking-plant operator, the facilities of which also form part of the Dillinger Hütte site.

Dillinger Hütte produces heavy steel plate, cast slag pots and semi-finished products, such as pressings, and (pressure) vessel heads and shell sections. Total production when the French subsidiary, GTS Industries, is included is well over two million tonnes of heavy plate annually, in a thickness range extending from 6 to 440 mm, making the company Europe's largest heavy plate producer. This robust material is used for fabrication of drilling rigs, ships, petrochemicals plants, bridges and heavy machinery; reference projects include the Öresund Bridge and the Millau Viaduct, the Moses Mabhida Stadium in Durban, and the luxury liner, Queen Mary 2. The striking arc of the Olympic Stadium in Athens was also welded from plate supplied by Dillinger Hütte. The main application for Dillinger Hütte's heavy plate output, however, is the making of large-caliber line pipe for major pipeline projects. The so-called thermomechanical rolling process, an extremely sophisticated rolling method which permits attainment of maximized mechanical properties combined with optimum working (bending and welding) characteristics, is used for these products. Dillinger Hütte is also a 50% owner of Europipe GmbH, Europe's largest manufacturer of large-caliber line pipe, with facilities in Germany, France and the USA.

Dillingen is the only location in the Saar region at which iron is smelted. The jointly owned ROGESA blast furnace operator also supplies Saarstahl, the other co-owner, with hot metal.

== Uses ==
Further examples of the use of steel from Dillinger Hütte:

- The Shanghai World Financial Center, the third highest building in the world (492 m)
- The Commerzbank Tower in Frankfurt, Europe's highest office block
- The New York Times Tower, in Manhattan
- The turbines for China's Three Gorges Dam
- The Erasmus Bridge, Rotterdam
- Sculptures by American artist Richard Serra, one of which is on view at the Guggenheim Museum in Bilbao.

== History ==
In 1685, Louis XIV of France - the famous "Sun King" - granted approval to the Marquis Charles Henri de Lénoncourt for the construction of an ironworks, complete with a smelting furnace, before the gates of the fortress of Saarlouis. Locational factors for the founding of this works were excellent - the nearby Prims river supplied the necessary water-power, the surrounding woods the fuel for the furnaces, and the ore deposits in the immediate vicinity the feed materials for production.

The first products were iron forgings, nails and cast artifacts such as pots, pans and so-called "Takenplatten", decorative iron plates that carried the heat of the kitchen over into the adjacent living space by conduction and radiation. Production was gradually optimized over succeeding years, with plate beginning to predominate in the mill's product mix as from 1802, following the construction of the first plate rolling-mill in continental Europe. These developments brought the factory to the forefront as Prussia's largest black and tin plate producer. With approval from emperor Napoléon Bonaparte, Dillinger Hütte in 1809 became Germany's first joint stock company, and one of the first in Europe. The company adopted the name Anonyme Gesellschaft der Dillinger Hüttenwerke in 1828. State-of-the-art rolling facilities and blast furnaces were installed, and by the beginning of the 19th century the workforce had grown to over 2,500. The so-called "Dillingen platemaker's gauge", covering twenty-four different plate thicknesses, had by then long become the definitive standard throughout Europe.

Dillinger Hütte was also progressive in the social sphere: an assistance and a pension fund were set up, and a works hospital, a residential estate for the plant's workers and a works school founded. The plant was 65% destroyed during the Second World War; nearly 200,000 shells fell on the plant site. The consequences were months of clearance work, and a completely fresh start. After the war, Dillinger Hütte continued to invest in steel, investing in worldwide innovations, such as the first slab caster in 1962, the new heavy-plate rolling mill in 1971, the world's most powerful rolling stand in 1985, the slab caster for the world's thickest slabs in 1998, and the world's largest plate-edge miller, in 2005.

Dillinger Hütte workers have traditionally been dubbed "Hüttenbären", or "steel mill bears" in the local region. This led to the company's day-center for employees' children being christened "Kleine Hüttenbären", or the "steel mill cubs", at its opening in 2007.

== Management ==
Karlheinz Blessing was CEO from 2011 to 2015.
