= Devil's Table (Lemberg) =

Coordinates: 49°9′37.69″N 7°42′16.13″E

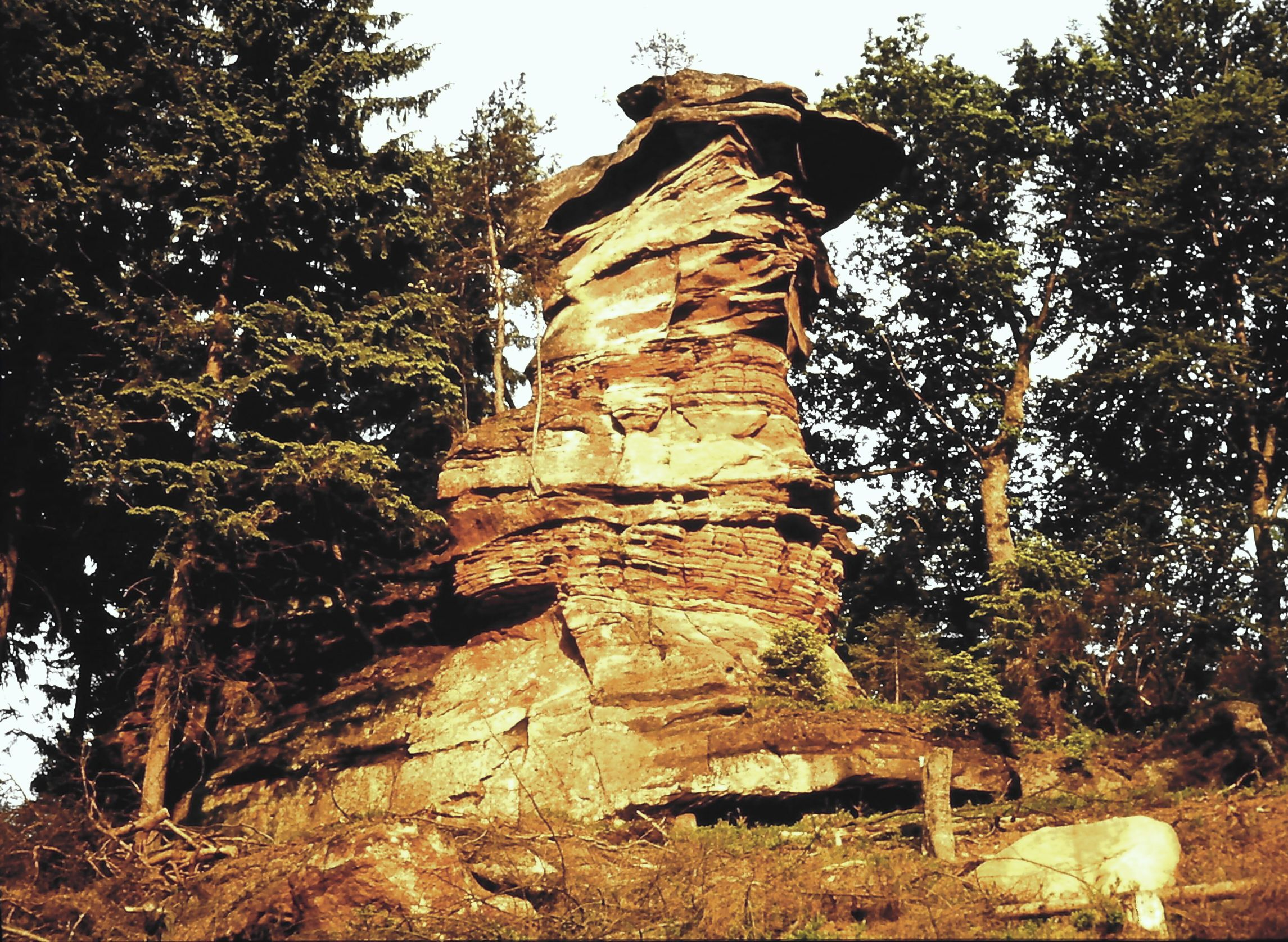
The Devil's Table of Salzwoog

The Devil's Table (German: Teufelstisch or Salzwooger Teufelstisch) of Salzwoog, in the municipality of Lemberg, is a striking mushroom rock in the German part of the Wasgau that covers the southern part of the Palatinate Forest in the state of Rhineland-Palatinate. The rock formation lies 5 km southwest of the largest and far better known Devil's Table of Hinterweidenthal, which also has a more impressive "table shape".

== Geography ==
The rock is located at an elevation of 320 m on the northwest slopes of the wooded western spur of the Bichtenberg hill (400 m). To the north are the water meadows of the Salzbach stream, which flows from west to east here and is a right-hand tributary of the Wieslauter. Also to the north is the state road, the Landesstraße 486, which runs from Lemberg via Salzwoog to Hinterweidenthal. The Salzwoog Devil's Table is accessible from the valley of Salzwoog on a narrow footpath which branches off the trail to Dahn and climbs through a height of about 80 metres. Above the rock is a rest area which offer a panoramic view over the Salzbach water meadows.

== Geology ==
Like its "larger brother" at Hinterweidenthal, the Devil's Table of Salzwoog is a bunter sandstone rock formation which resembles a pedestal table. As a result or erosion the surrounding softer surface material was carried away, whilst the hard rock core remained standing. This has left an oversized "table top" perched diagonally over an equally massive "pedestal". In the Dahner Felsenland, as the region to the east is called, these types of unusually shaped rocks are very common.

== Tourism ==
The rock is the destination of a circular walk in the Palatinate Hiking Portal (Wanderportals Pfalz).
