= Devil's Table (Hinterweidenthal) =

Coordinates: 49°11′41.65″N 7°44′37.54″E

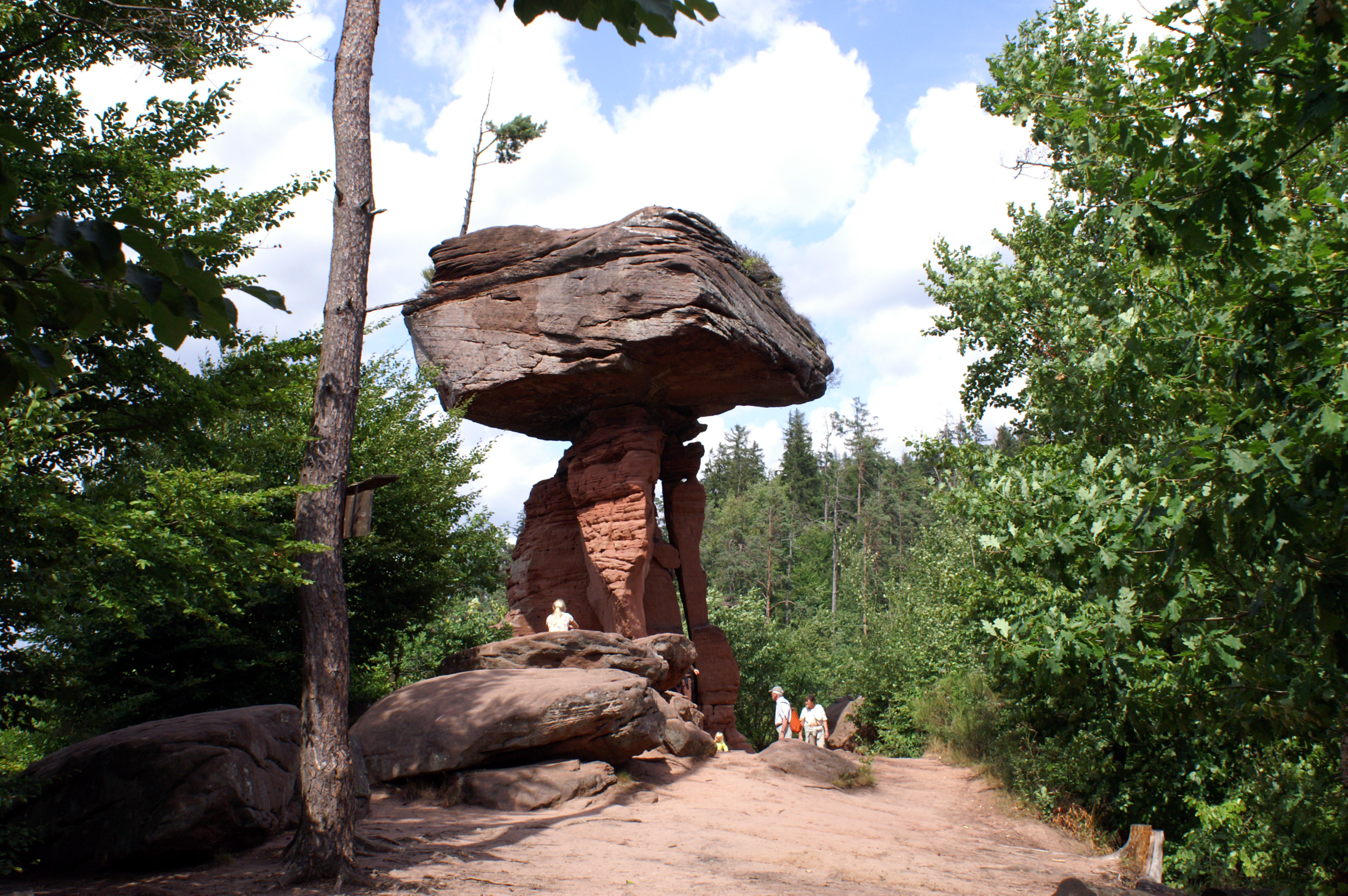
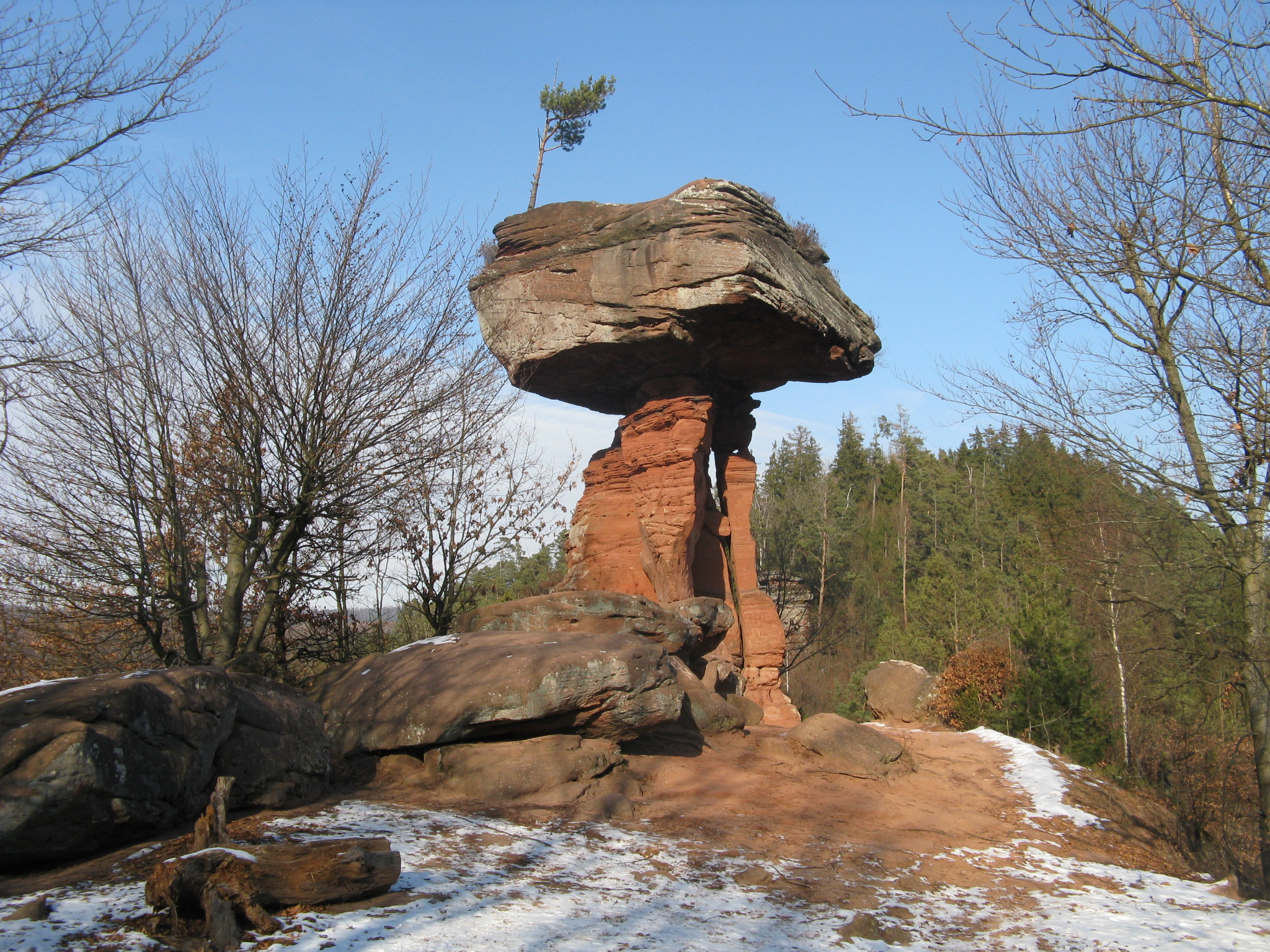
The Devil's Table of Hinterweidenthal in summer and winter.

The Devil's Table (German: Teufelstisch) in Hinterweidenthal is a 14 metre high mushroom rock in the German part of the Wasgau region, the southern Palatine Forest in the state of Rhineland-Palatinate). Thanks to its location in the territory of the village of Kaltenbach - formerly part of Wilgartswiesen – it is often called the Kaltenbach Devil's Table (Kaltenbacher Teufelstisch), especially in old literary sources. It is larger and better known than the Devil's Table of Salzwoog, which is only 5 kilometres away to the southwest.

The Hinterweidenthal Devil's Table is one of the landscape symbols of the Palatinate and is also the subject of a local legend. In 1947 the rock was portrayed on a Rhineland-Palatinate postage stamp.

== Geography ==
The Devil's Table stands a few hundred metres south of the B 10 road and west of Hinterweidenthal-Kaltenbach on a 312-metre-high ridge, which runs for over two kilometres from Etschberg in the southwest to the 324-metre-high Handschuh-Kopf in the northeast. The rock towers prominently over the surrounding woods. At night it is lit from the northern side, so that it can be seen from the B 10.

At the foot of the hill on which the Devil's Table stands, is a car park, an inn and the Devil's Table Adventure Park (Erlebnispark Teufelstisch).

== Geology ==
=== Stratigraphy ===
The German term Buntsandstein is used to describe a lithostratigraphic rock unit that consists largely of interbedded sand-, silt- and claystones. These lithologies were sedimented in a large basin covering an area equivalent to that lying between England and Poland in a west-east direction and Scandinavia and Switzerland in the north-south direction. The Dahner Felsenland (Dahn Rockland) is dominated by sandstones that were deposited during the Early Buntsandstein, about 252.2 until 249 Ma before present. This succession - that also forms the Devil’s Table – is locally known as the Rehberg Formation, which is stratigraphically equivalent to the Bernburg Formation of the Central Germanic Basin.

=== Lithologic description ===
The circa 150 m thick Rehberg Formation is characterised by alternating hard sandstones – so called “rock zones” and less resistant sandstones referred to as “thin layers“. The rock zones consist of partially silicified, medium- and coarse-grained sandstones, which are in part gravelly. These are commonly massive cross-bedded units with a red to violet colouration, which were deposited mostly in a fluvial environment. The fine-grained “thin layers“ on the other hand show no silicification and indicate a deposition in stagnant water. These layers were deposited mostly as aeolian sediment. The lack of boulders and clay in these fine-grained and light brick-red to orange coloured thin layers indicates the absence of water for the most part of the sedimentation process. They represent wind-driven sedimentary deposits in closed drainage basins under arid and hot desert climate conditions. The provenance area of the sediment was the Gallic land, which bordered the Buntsandstein basin to the west. This uplifted source area stretched from today’s Belgium to the Massif Central in France.

=== Formation of the Devil’s Table ===
The Rehberg Formation commonly forms table rock formations such as the Devil’s Table. The siliceous harder rock zones lie on top of the softer thin layers, that are more susceptible to weathering and erosion. The tabletop-like blocks protect the remaining pillars of less resistant material from further erosion. The shape of the Devil’s Table and its thin pillars is defined by preexisting fractures at the upper and lower end of the tabletop. The natural monument of the „Devil’s Table“ represents an important landmark of the Palatinate Forest and was classified as a „National Geotope“ in 2006. In the surrounding are, there are numerous impressive rock formations in the Dahn Rockland, which are also worth a visit!
