= Teufelstisch (Bavarian Forest) =

Mountain in Germany

Coordinates: 48°56′N 13°04′E

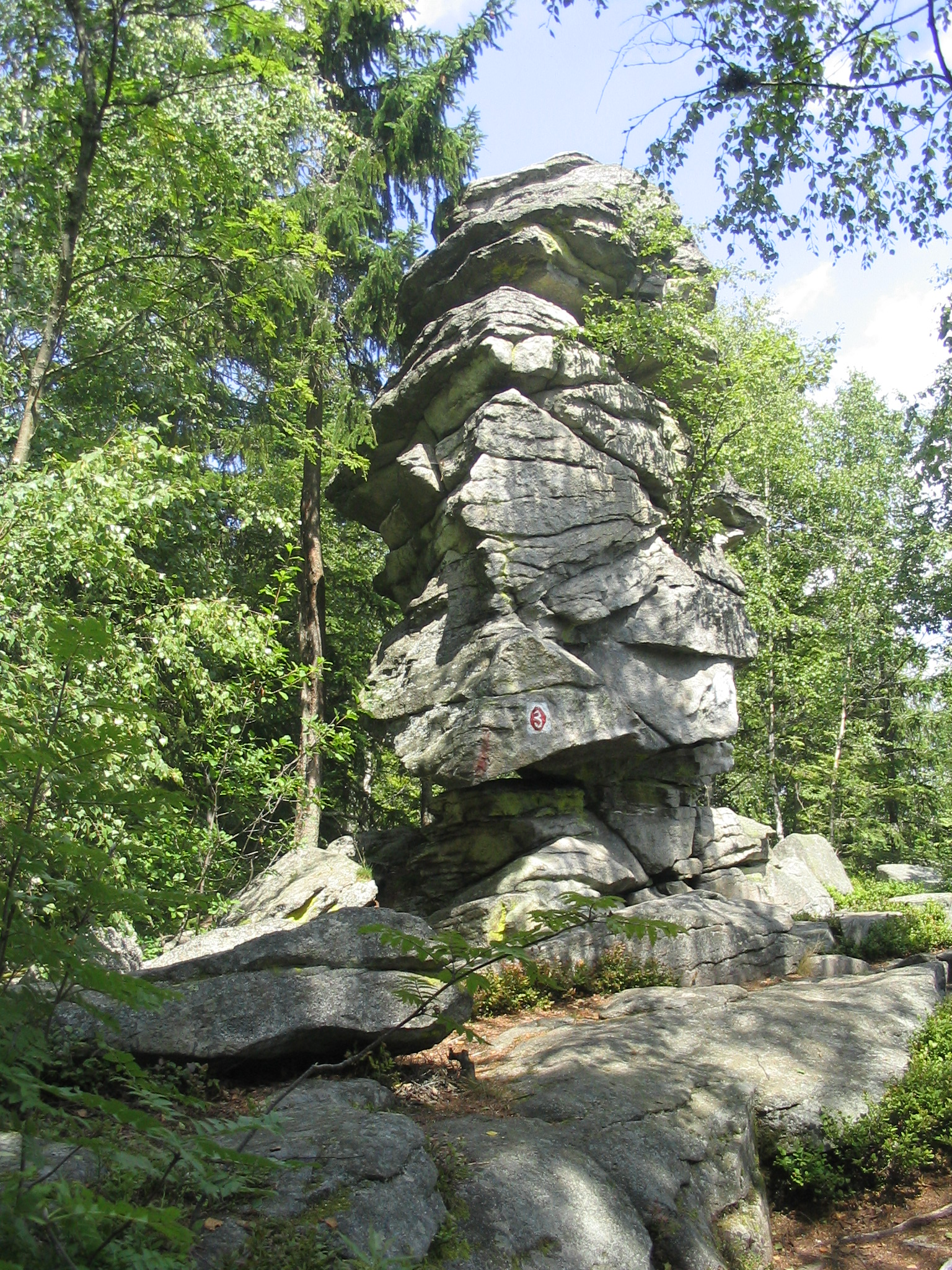
- Teufelstisch.

Highest point
- Elevation: 901 m (2,956 ft)

Geography
- Location: Bavaria, Germany

Teufelstisch is a mountain of Bavaria, Germany.
