= Hinterweidenthal =

- Municipality
- Coat of arms

- Location of Hinterweidenthal within Südwestpfalz district
- Interactive map of Hinterweidenthal
- Location within Germany Location within Rhineland-Palatinate
- Coordinates: 49°12′N 7°45′E
- Country: Germany
- State: Rhineland-Palatinate
- District: Südwestpfalz
- Municipal assoc.: Hauenstein

Government
  - Mayor (2019–24): Barbara Schenk

Area
  - Total: 16.90 km^{2} (6.53 sq mi)
- Elevation: 242 m (794 ft)

Population (2025-12-31)
  - Total: 1,465
  - Density: 86.69/km^{2} (224.5/sq mi)
- Time zone: UTC+01:00 (CET)
  - Summer (DST): UTC+02:00 (CEST)
- Postal codes: 66999
- Dialling codes: 06396
- Vehicle registration: PS
- Website: www.hinterweidenthal.de

Hinterweidenthal is a municipality in Südwestpfalz district, in Rhineland-Palatinate, western Germany.

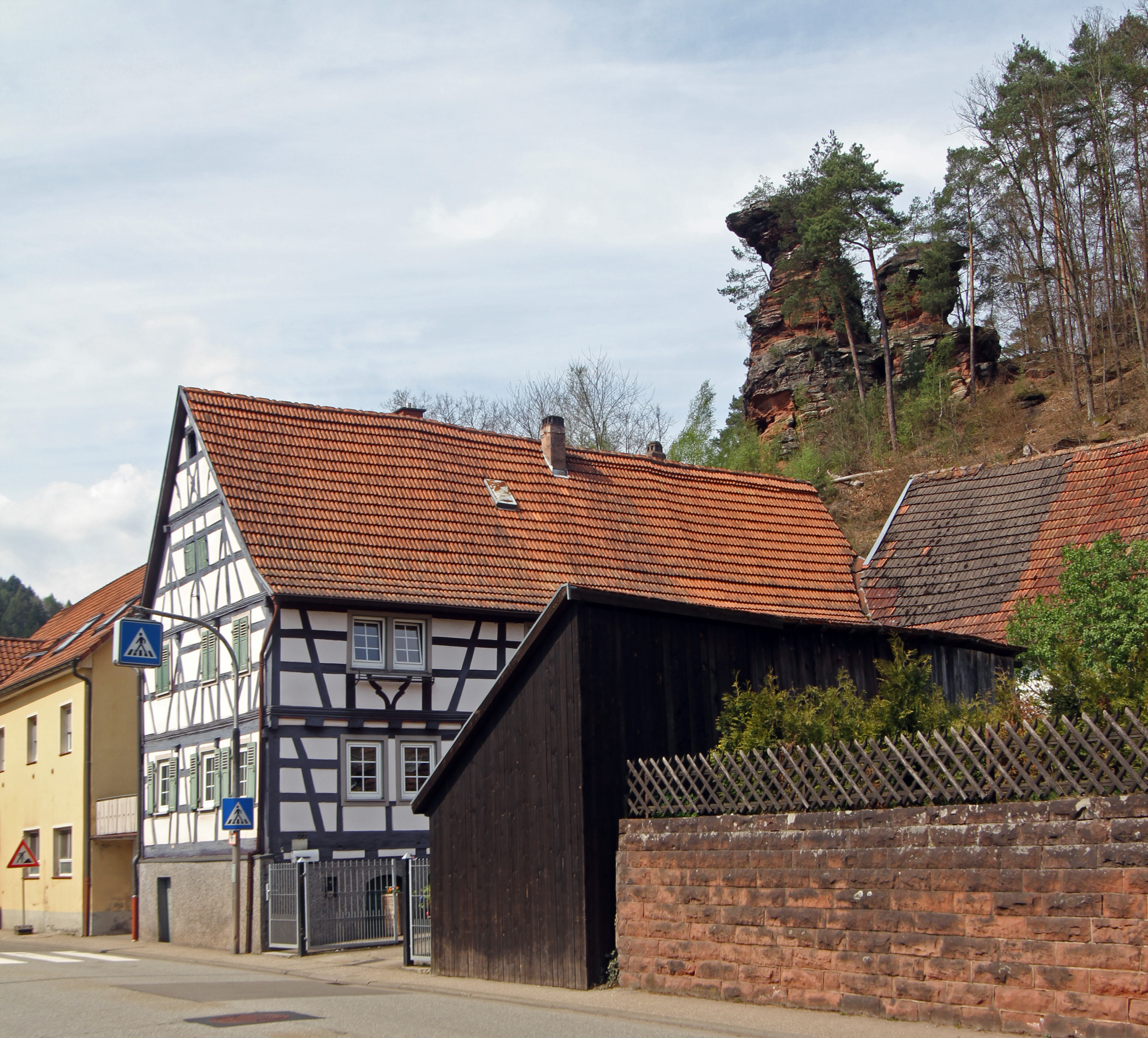
Half-timbered house and sandstone rock
