= Erlenbach (Michelsbach) =

River in Germany

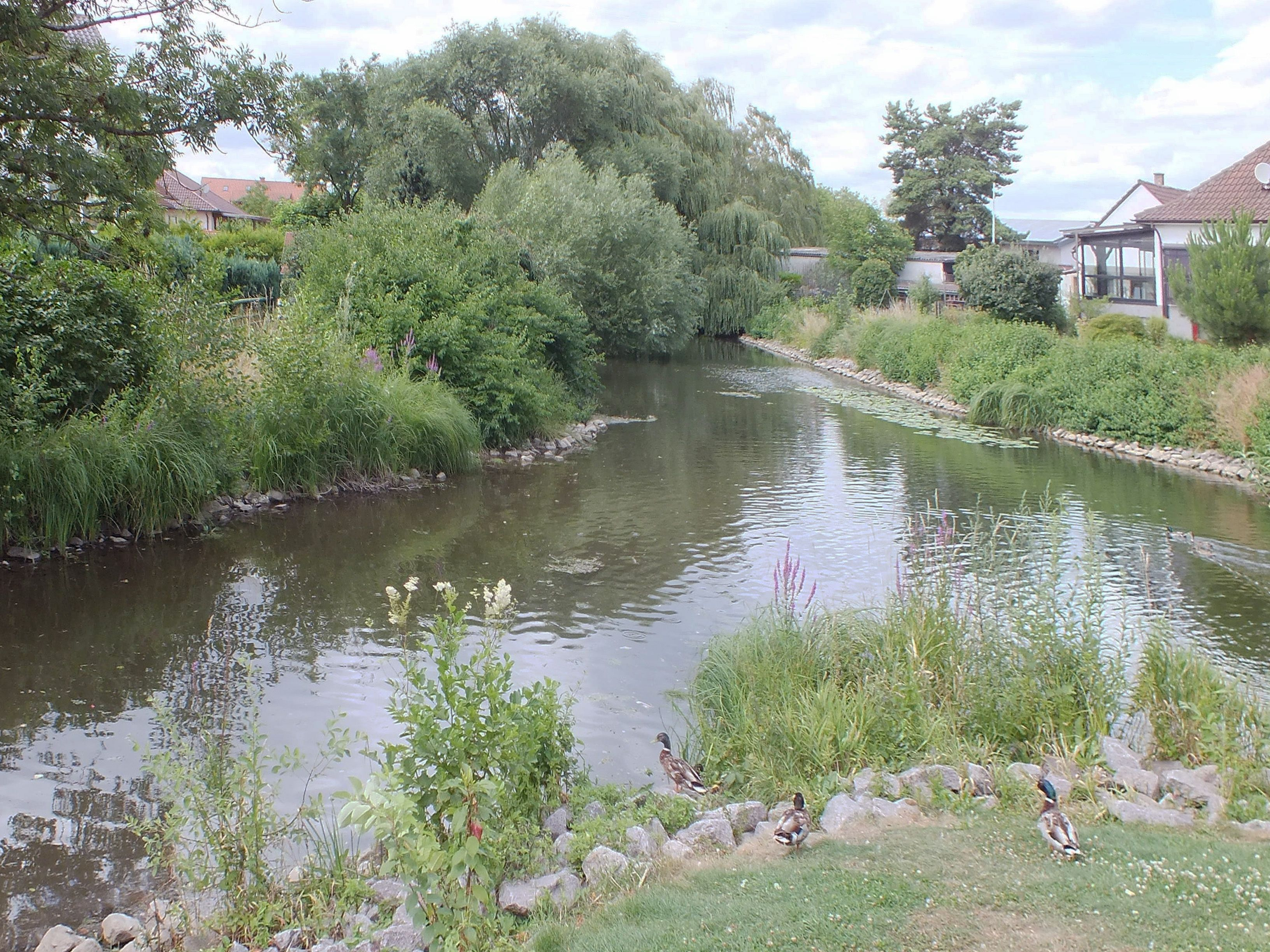
- The mouth of the Erlenbach (left) into the Michelsbach (rear)

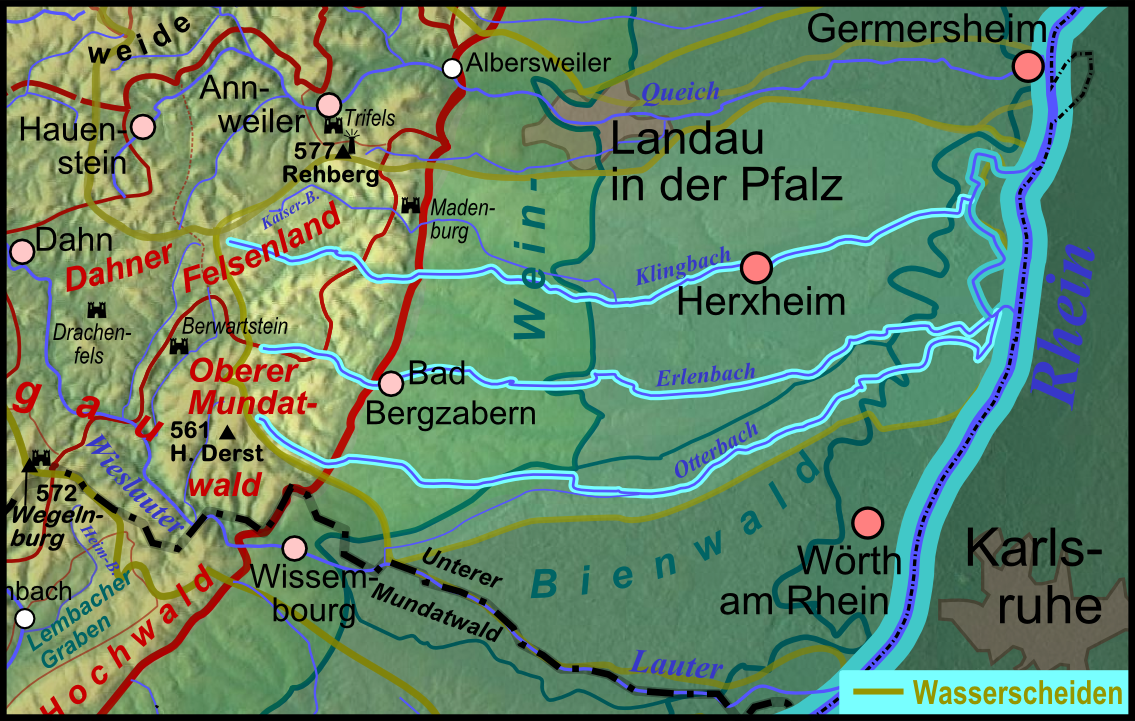
- Course of the Erlenbach (centre)

Location
- Country: Germany
- State: Rhineland-Palatinate
- Region: South Palatinate
- Reference no.: DE: 237542

Physical characteristics
- Source
  - location: in Birkenhördt
  - coordinates: 49°06′56″N 7°55′56″E
  - elevation: 245 m above sea level (NHN)
- Mouth
  - location: in Leimersheim from the left into the Michelsbach
  - coordinates: 49°07′36″N 8°20′35″E
  - elevation: 97 m above sea level (NHN)
- Length: 34.2 km
- Basin size: 109.127 km²

Basin features
- Progression: Michelsbach → Rhine → North Sea
- River system: Rhine
- Landmarks: Small towns: Bad Bergzabern, Kandel; Villages: Birkenhördt, Kapellen-Drusweiler, Oberhausen, Barbelroth, Winden, Erlenbach, Hatzenbühl, Rheinzabern, Neupotz, Leimersheim
- Tributaries
  - left: Anbach, Horbach, Waidlachgraben, Grüner Graben, Feldlachgraben
  - right: Böllenborn (auch Steinbach)

The Erlenbach (German: [ˈɛʁlənbax]) is a 34.2 km long, left tributary of the Michelsbach in the German state of Rhineland-Palatinate.

== Course ==
The Erlenbach rises in the South Palatine Wasgau region, the southern part of the Palatine Forest, in the municipality of Birkenhördt. It flows eastwards and leaves the Palatine Forest near Bad Bergzabern, where it breaks through the Forest's its eastern perimeter, the Haardt. Next it flows through Kapellen-Drusweiler, Oberhausen, Barbelroth and Winden, before forming the boundary between Kandel and Erlenbach, then Hatzenbühl. After it passes Rheinzabern and Neupotz, it unites in Leimersheim with the Otterbach, coming from the right, to empty into the Michelsbach.

The Michelsbach consists of several former Old Rhine loops and discharges into the Rhine itself at Sondernheim after running parallel to the Rhine for 10 km.

== See also ==
- List of rivers of Rhineland-Palatinate
