= Birkenhördt =

- Municipality
- Coat of arms

- Location of Birkenhördt within Südliche Weinstraße district
- Interactive map of Birkenhördt
- Location within Germany Location within Rhineland-Palatinate
- Coordinates: 49°06′54″N 7°55′48″E
- Country: Germany
- State: Rhineland-Palatinate
- District: Südliche Weinstraße
- Municipal assoc.: Bad Bergzabern

Government
  - Mayor (2019–24): Matthias Ackermann (CDU)

Area
  - Total: 8.58 km^{2} (3.31 sq mi)
- Elevation: 253 m (830 ft)

Population (2025-12-31)
  - Total: 629
  - Density: 73.3/km^{2} (190/sq mi)
- Time zone: UTC+01:00 (CET)
  - Summer (DST): UTC+02:00 (CEST)
- Postal codes: 76889
- Dialling codes: 06343
- Vehicle registration: SÜW
- Website: www.birkenhoerdt.de

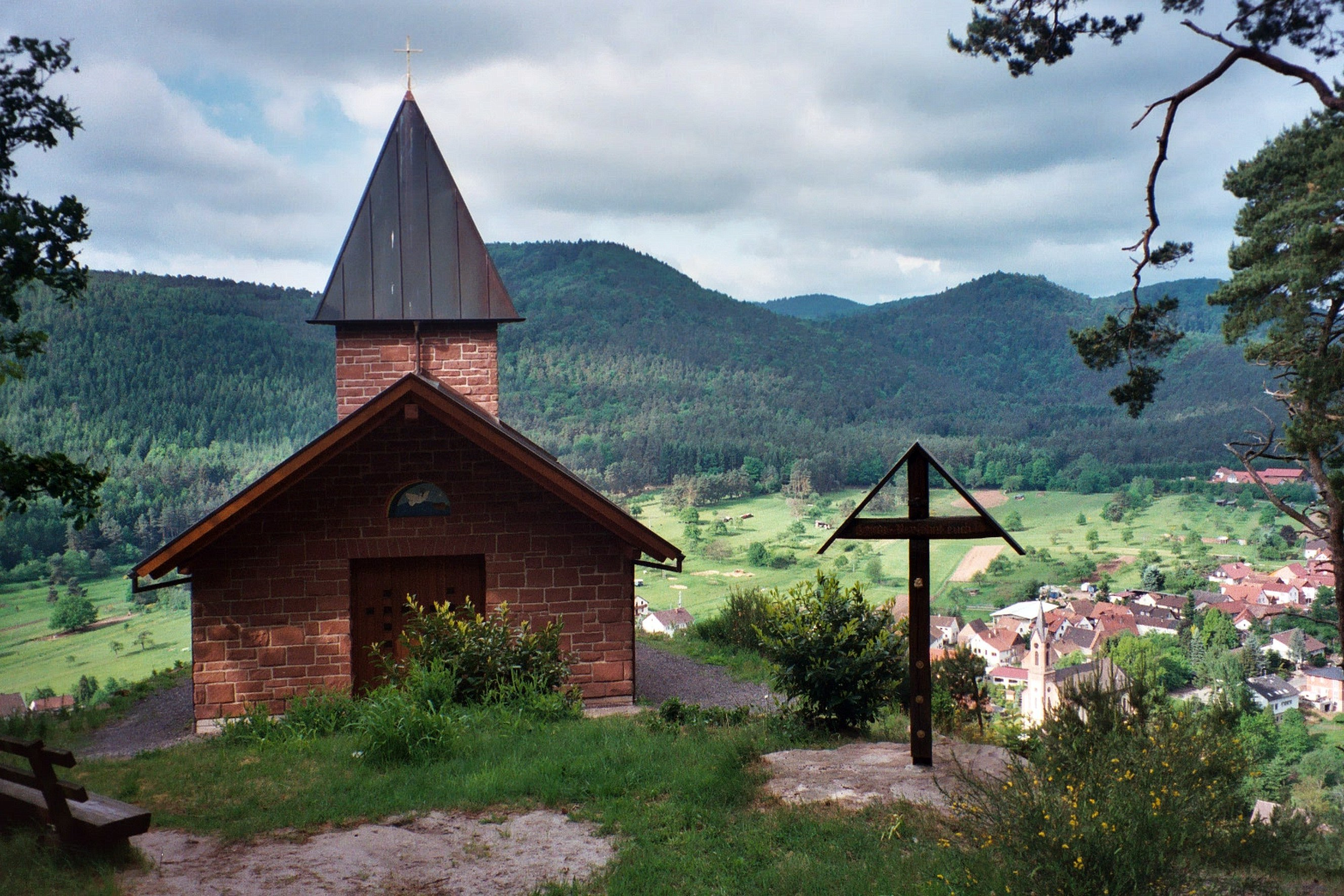
Birkenhördt – "Friedenskapelle" with view of the Village

Birkenhördt (German pronunciation: [ˈbɪʁkn̩hœʁt]) is a municipality in the Südliche Weinstraße district, in Rhineland-Palatinate, Germany, and is an officially recognized tourist resort.

== Geography ==
Birkenhördt lies in the Wasgau, which is composed of the southern part of the Palatine Forest and the northern part of the Vosges Mountains.

Neighboring municipalities are - clockwise - Silz, Bad Bergzabern, Dörrenbach, Böllenborn, Erlenbach bei Dahn, and Vorderweidenthal.

The source of the Erlenbach is located in Birkenhördt.

== History ==
In the 1930s Birkenhördt was annexed to the district of Bad Bergzabern. With the local-government reform in Rhineland-Palatinate in 1969 Birkenhördt, along with most communities of the district was incorporated into the newly created district Landau-Bad Bergzabern. This in turn was renamed in 1978 as the Südliche Weinstraße district.

== Coat of arms ==
The coat of arms shows a golden lion on a black field symbolizing Birkenhördt's one-time allegiance to the Palatinate, and a green birch branch as a visual pun on the name "Birkenhördt". They might be heraldically described "Party per bend sinister, sable a lion passant bendwise sinister or crowned armed and langued gules, or a three-leaved birch branch vert."

== Culture and sightseeing ==
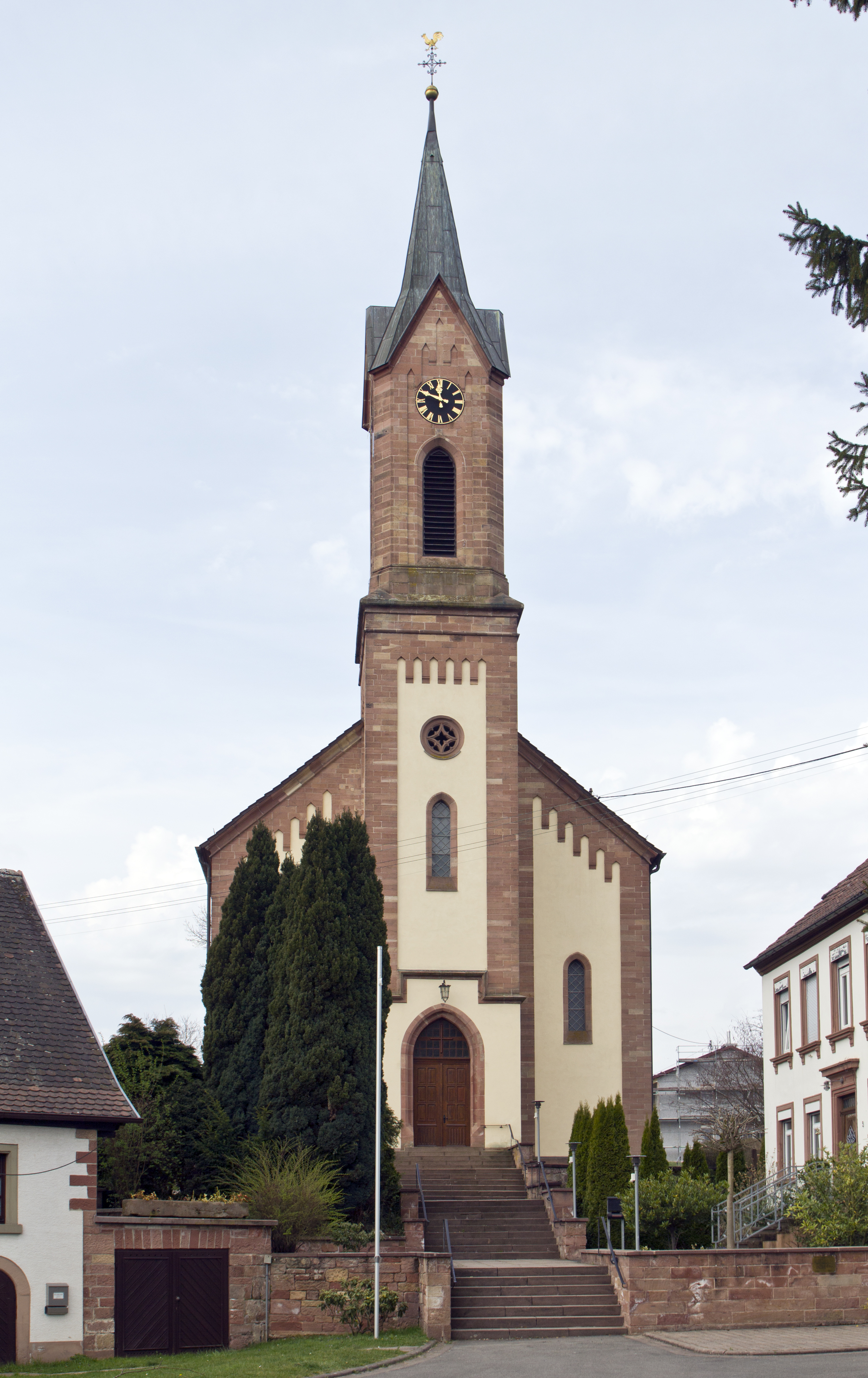
Catholic church of St. Gall, Birkenhördt

There are a total of six cultural monuments in the municipality, including the 1862 parish church of Saint Gall.

== Transportation ==
Bundesstraße (Federal Highway) 427 runs through the middle of the town. Birkenhördt is connected by the bus lines to the local transport network. The nearest railway station is located at Bad Bergzabern.
