= Weissenburg Abbey, Alsace =

Former Benedictine abbey in Wissembourg in Alsace, France

Coordinates: 49°2′13″N 7°56′32″E

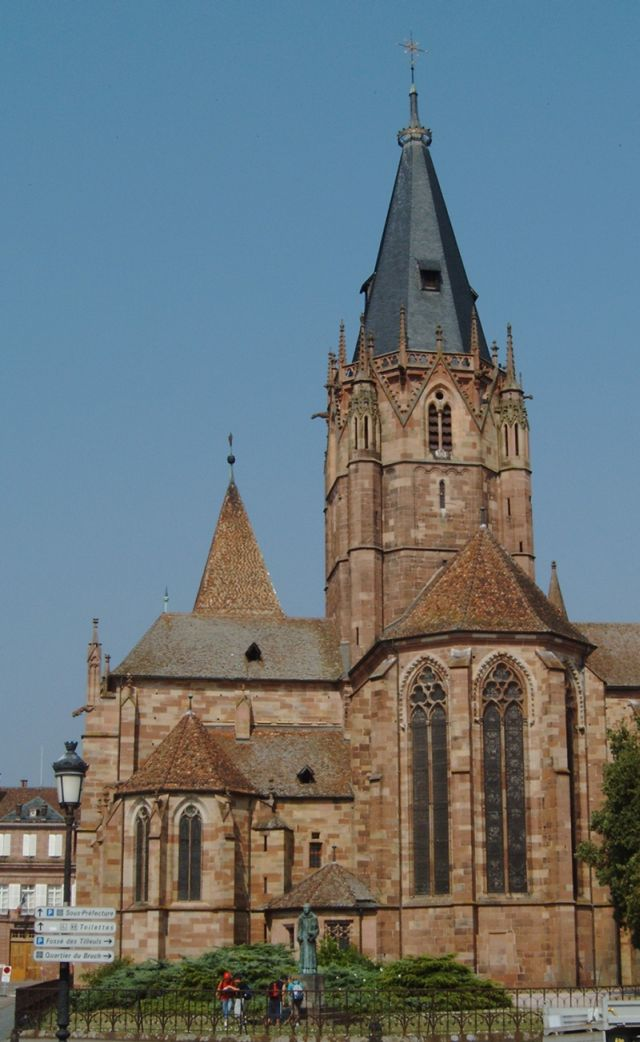
Collegiate Church of SS. Peter and Paul, part of the old abbey

Weissemburg Abbey (German: Kloster Weißenburg, French: L'abbaye de Wissembourg), also Wissembourg Abbey, is a former Benedictine abbey (1524–1789: collegiate church) in Wissembourg in Alsace, France.

== History ==
Weissenburg Abbey was founded in 661 by the Bishop of Speyer, Dragobodo. The name Wissembourg is a Gallicized version of Weißenburg (Weissenburg) in German meaning "white castle".

Thanks to donations from the nobility and local landowners the monastery quickly acquired possessions and estates in the Alsace, Electorate of the Palatinate and in the west-Rhine county of Ufgau. As a result, manorial farms and peasant farmsteads were set up and agriculture system introduced to create fertile arable farmland.

Around 1100, it was important for the monastery, which had now become wealthy, to distance itself from the Bishop of Speyer and his influence. To this end a new tradition was established about the origins of the monastery, backed up by forged documents (such forgery was not anything unusual in the Middle Ages). In the case of Weissenburg, the story now ran that the abbey had been founded in 623 by the Merovingian king, Dagobert I. Detailed historic research in recent decades has demonstrated that this was unlikely to have been the case.

Weissenburg developed quickly into one of the wealthiest and culturally most significant abbeys in Germany. As early as 682 it was able to purchase shares in a saltworks in Vic-sur-Seille for the princely sum of 500 solidi; in 760 it was given the Mundat Forest. The Gospel Book (Evangelienbuch) written around 860 by a monk, Otfrid of Weissenburg, represented a milestone in the development of German language and literature. it is the first poem to employ rhyme instead of the old Germanic alliteration, though the rhyme is still very imperfect, being often mere assonance, with frequent traces of alliteration.

At that time the abbey was in the charge of Abbot Grimald of Weissenburg, who was also the Abbot of the Abbey of Saint Gall and chancellor to Emperor Louis the German, and thus was one of the most important figures in the whole of the German imperial church.

The abbey lost an important possession, however, when in 985 the Salian Duke Otto appropriated 68 of the parishes belonging to it in the so-called Salian Church Robbery (Salischer Kirchenraub). Above all though, it was the transition from a situation in which the abbey managed its monastic estates itself to a feudal system in which the estates were granted as fiefs, that resulted in the loss of most of the abbey's possessions. This was because, over time, their vassal viewed their fiefs as allods, i.e. as freehold properties. Thus the once extensive monastic estates increasingly evaporated. In the 16th century only three estates were left out of the thousands the abbey used to possess: these were Steinfeld, Schweighofen and Koppelhof; in addition, the abbey had tithe rights in Weissenburg and Bergzabern which gave it an annual income of 1,500 gulden.

In 1262–1293, during the time of its decline, Abbot Edelin (d. 15 October 1293) attempted to halt the loss of the monastic estates and to recover its stolen property by compiling a record of the abbey's possessions in a new register. This index, called the Codex Edelini or Liber Possessionum, is currently held in the Speyer State Archives (Landesarchiv Speyer). Edelin is credited with building the Gothic abbey church, which still stands today. The church incorporated a Romanesque bell tower, the sole remains of the earlier church built in the 11th century under the direction of abbot Samuel. (The church is on the Route Romane d'Alsace.) He also oversaw the construction of a refectory and subterranean furnaces to warm the monastery.

Around 1465 Nikolaus Gerhaert carved a series of four reliquaries from walnut for the abbey. That of Saint Agnes is now at Anglesey Abbey; (Saints Barbara and Catherine are in the Metropolitan Museum in New York and the St Margaret in the Art Institute of Chicago.) In 1524, the abbey, now entirely destitute, was turned into a secular collegiate church at the instigation of its last abbot, Rüdiger Fischer, which was then united with the Bishopric of Speyer in 1546.

The princely provost of Weissenberg had an individual vote in the Reichsfürstenrat of the Reichstag of the Holy Roman Empire of the German Nation. In the wake of the French Revolution the foundation was dissolved in 1789.

Part of the monastic library went in the 17th century to the Herzog August Library in Wolfenbüttel, the abbey records largely perished in the confusion of the revolutionary period.

An annual Christmas fair is held on weekends in Advent, in the area around the church.

== Estates ==
In 1764 the secular state of the Princely Propstei of Weissenburg comprised the following offices and estates (in today's spelling):

1. the Provost's Office with a master of the household (Hofmeister), provost's counsel (Probsteirat), secretaries, architect (Baumeister) and messengers (Boten)
2. the court (Staffelgericht) in Weissenburg with nine officials
3. the Fauthei of Schlettenbach with four officials and the villages of Bobenthal, Bundenthal, Bärenbach, Finsternheim and Erlenbach
4. the Provost's Court (Propsteigericht) in the Zweibrücken district of Kleeburg with three officials
5. the districts of Altstadt and St. Remig with eleven officials and the villages of Großsteinfeld, Kleinsteinfeld, Kapsweyer, St. Remig, Schweighofen, Schleithal and Oberseebach
6. the stewardship (Schaffnerei) of Hagenau with two officials for St. Walpurga's Abbey
7. the Sheriff's Office (Schultheißerei) of Uhlweiler near Hagenau

Towards the end of the 18th century the territories of the Propstei of Weissenburg covered 28 square miles with 50,000 inhabitants.

== List of abbots of Weissenburg ==
In his abbey chronicle which first appeared in 1551, the theologian and historian, Kaspar Brusch, left a record of the abbots of Weissenburg, which appears to be partly fictitious (at least for the abbots who presided before Dragobodo - to wit the rather stylized name of the supposed first abbot, "Principius"). In addition Brusch suggests this himself ("Nihil enim de his Abbatibus primis aliud scriptum reperi, quorum seriem etiam ac successionem aliquid erroris habere non dubito". As the source for the abbots before Adalbertus (No. 23) he discloses that he was given this information by the Bishop of Speyer of that time).

- Principius
- Cheodonius
- Radefridus
- Ehrwaldus
- Instulphus
- Astrammus
- Gerbertus
- Ehrimbertus
- Dragobodo (also Bishop of Speyer)
- Charialdus
- Bernhardus (or Wernharius; later Bishop of Worms)
- David
- Wielandus
- Grimald, (around 825–839)
- Odgerus (or Odogarius, 839–847, also Archbishop of Mainz)
- Grimald, (847–872, for the second time)
- Volcoldus
- Gerochus
- Voltwicus
- Mimoldus
- Adelhardus
- Gerrichus
- Ercarmius
- Adalbertus (abbot from 966, in 968 Archbishop of Magdeburg, died there in 981)
- Sanderadus (970–985. His period of office ended apparently violently in connexion with the so-called Salian Church Robbery)
- Gisillarius (985–989)
- Gerrichus (989–1001)
- Sigebodo (1001–1002)
- Luithardus (1002–1032. During his time in office, in 1004, the abbey burned down)
- Volmar (1032–1043)
- Arnoldus (1043–1055, since 1051 also Bishop of Speyer)
- Samuel (1055–1097; cf. Neue deutsche Biographie, Vol. 22, p. 411.)
- Stephanus
- Menigandus
- Ulrich
- Werinharus
- Ernestus
- Benedictus
- Engiscalus
- Gundelacus (or Gundericus)
- Godefridus
- Walramus (or Wolframus; 1197–1224)
- Chuno (1222–1248)
- Conradus (1248–1251)
- Friedricus (1251–1262)
- Edelinus (1263–1293)
- Wilhelmus (1293–1301)
- Egidius (1301–1312)
- Bartholomaeus (1312–1316)
- Wilhelmus (1316–1322)
- Johannes (1322–1337)
- Eberhardus (1337–1381)
- Hugo (1381–1402)
- Johannes (1402–1434; took part in the Council of Constance)
- Philipp (1435–1467)
- Jacobus (1467–1472)
- Henricus (1475–1496)
- Wilhelmus (1496–1500)
- Rudigerus (1500–1545; during his office the completely destitute abbey was turned into a secular collegiate church in 1524, which was united in 1546 with the Bishopric of Speyer.)

With that ends the series of abbots. The provosts of the collegiate church were identical with the bishops of Speyer.

Source: Caspar Bruschius: Chronologia monasteriorum Gemaniae praecipuorum, Sulzbach, 1681

== Historic reference ==
In 1592 Bernhart Hertzog wrote about Weissenburg Abbey in the Edelsass Chronicle (Edelsasser Chronik) as follows:

Das Closter Weissenburg Sanct Benedicten Ordens ist der mächtigsten und ältesten Clöszters eines in Teutschland gewesen; wird unter die vier Abteyen des Römischen Reichs gezahlt, ward gebauen in dem Elsass an dem Berg Vogeseo in der Reichsstatt Weissenburg bey dem Fluss die Lautter genannt, welche mitten durch die Staat fleusst, an einem lustigen Ort des Bistumbs; die Alten haben es Witzenburg oder der Weisheit Burg genannt, dieweil die Münch solches Closters jederzeit in guter Lehr gehalten worden. Weissenburg Abbey, of the Order of Saint Benedict, has become the mightiest and oldest monastery in Germany; it is one of the four abbeys of the Roman Empire, was built in the Alsace in the Vosges Mountains in the imperial town of Weissenburg by the river called the Lautter, which flows through the middle of the town, in a pleasant part of the Bishopric; the old [folk] called it Witzenburg or Weisheit Castle ["Wisdom Castle"] because the monks had always received good teaching there.

== Gallery ==
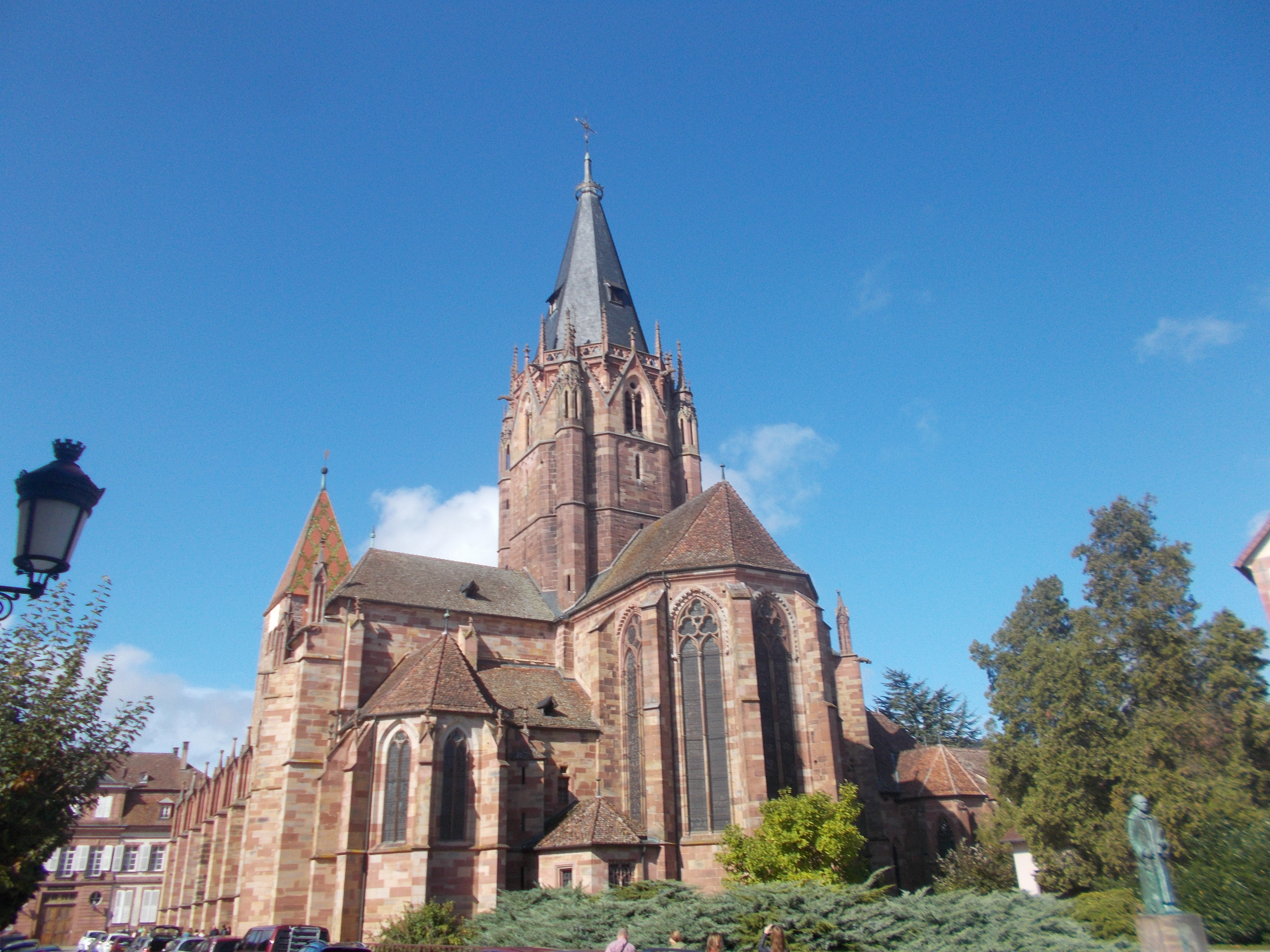

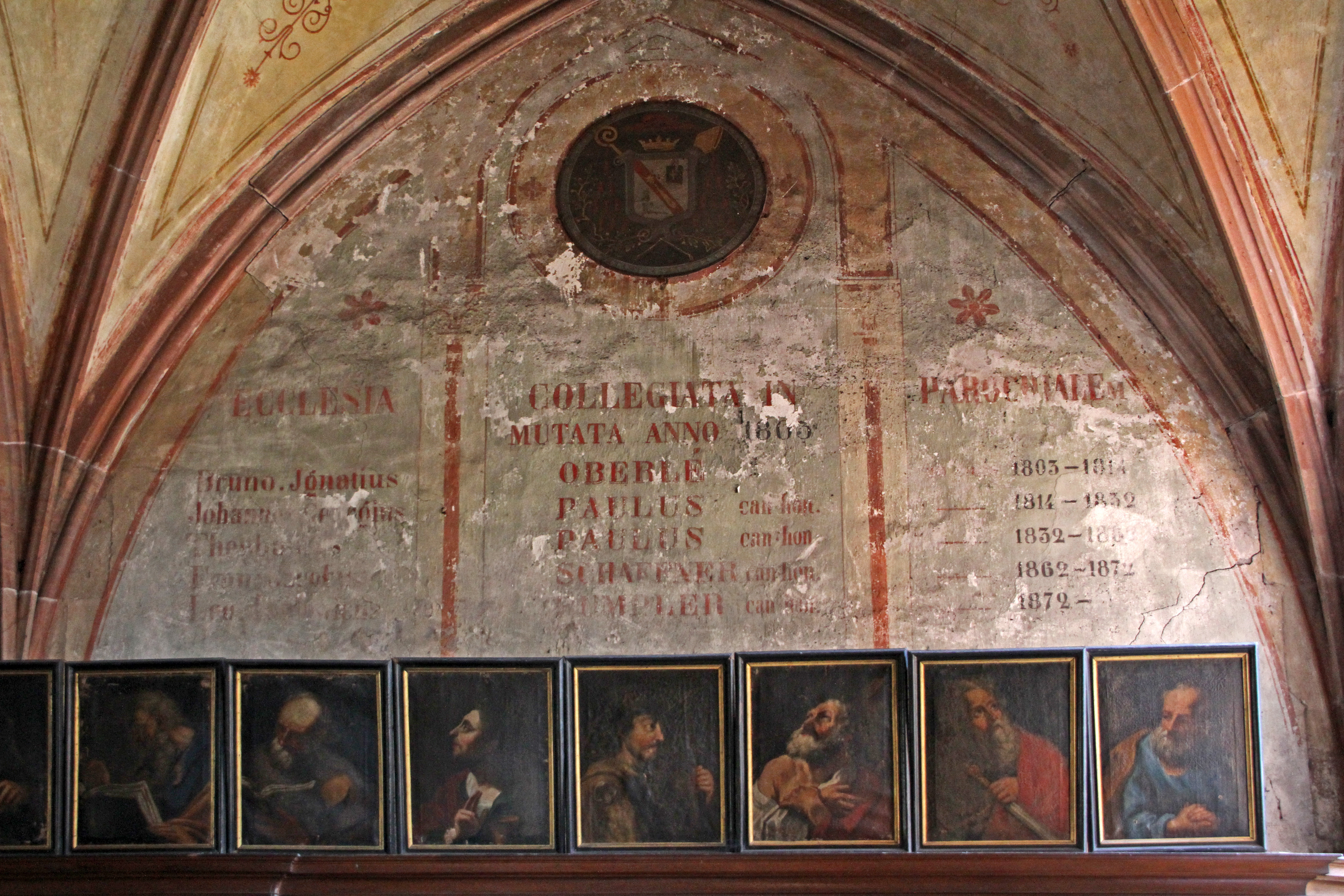

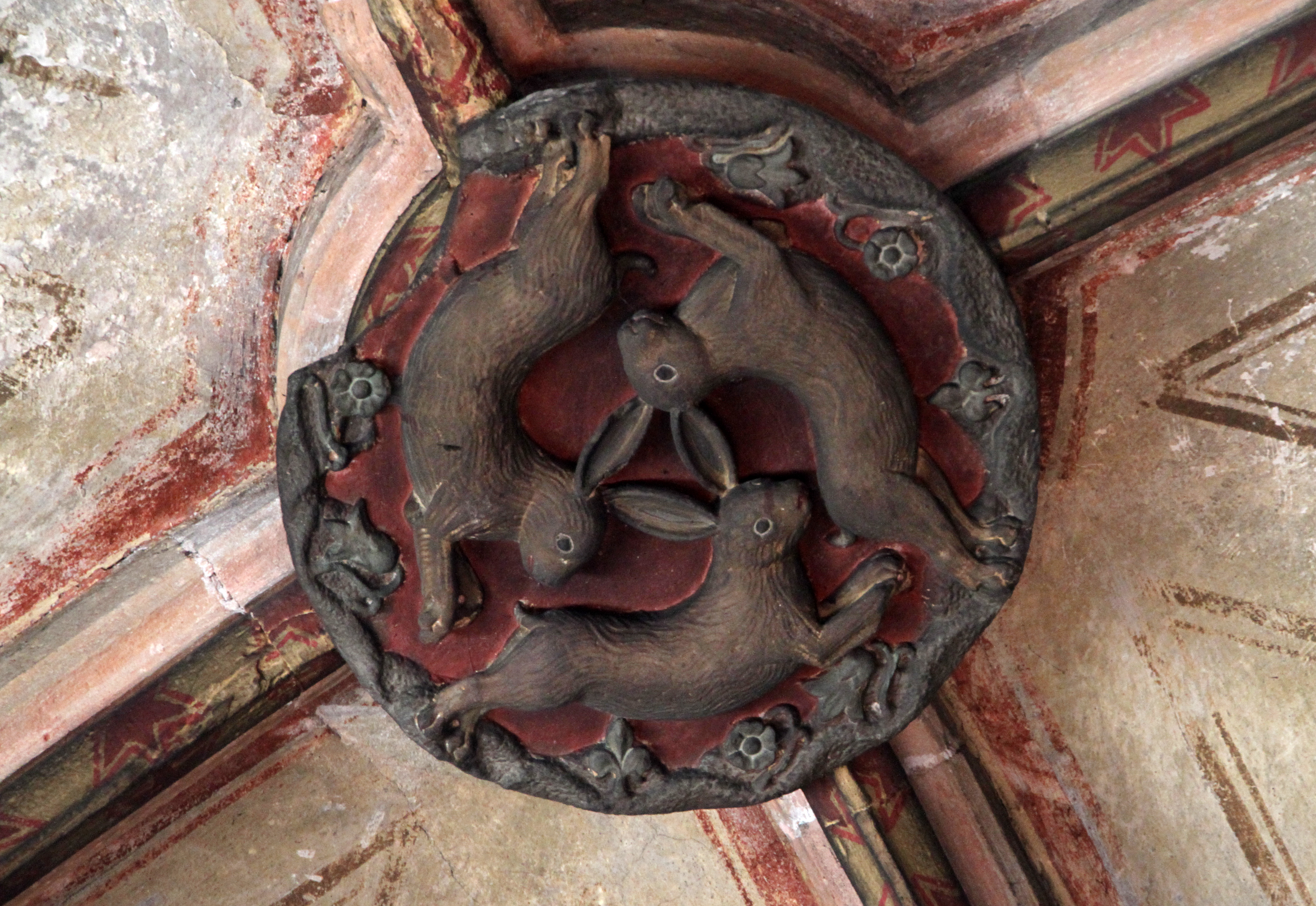

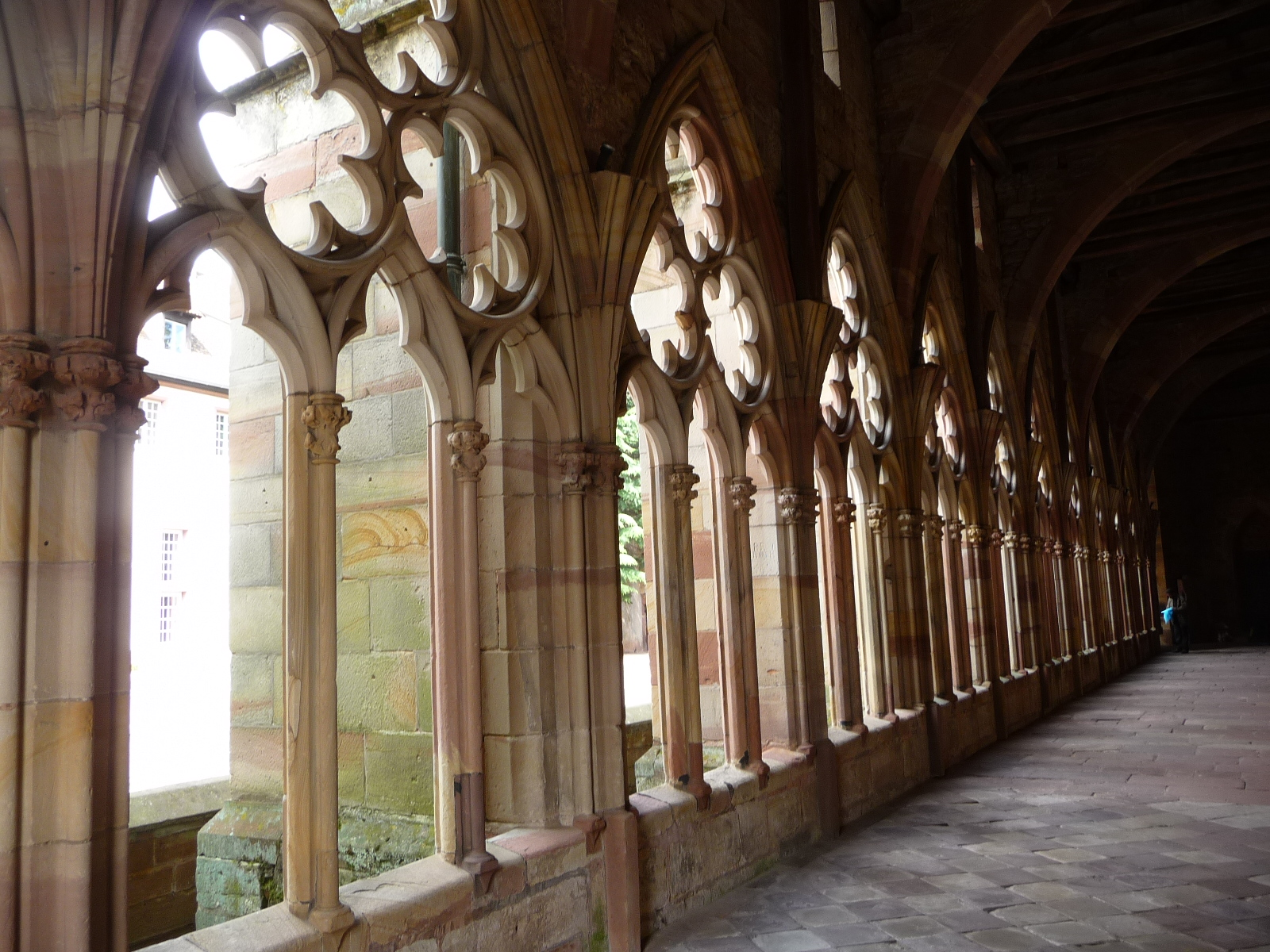

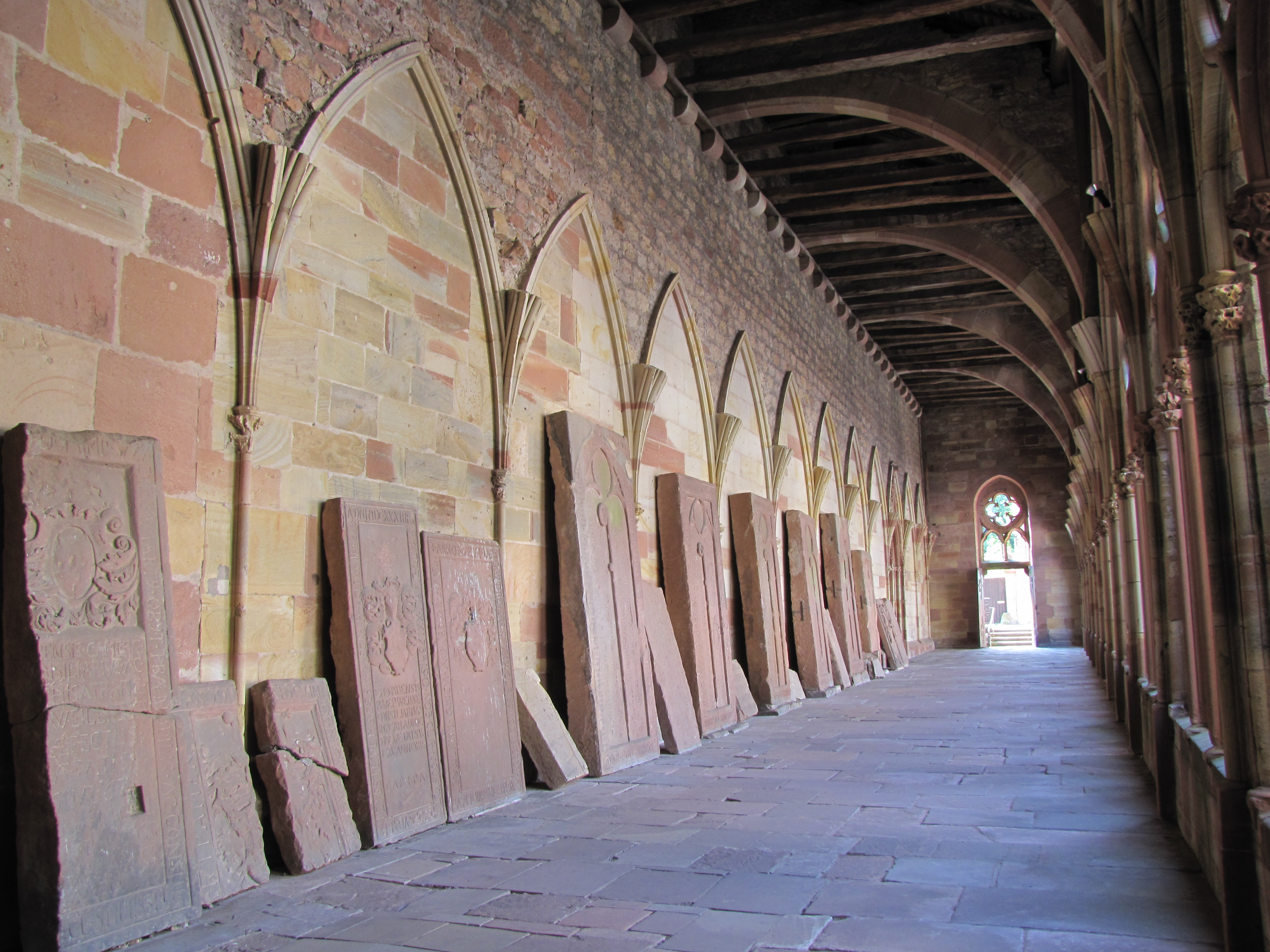

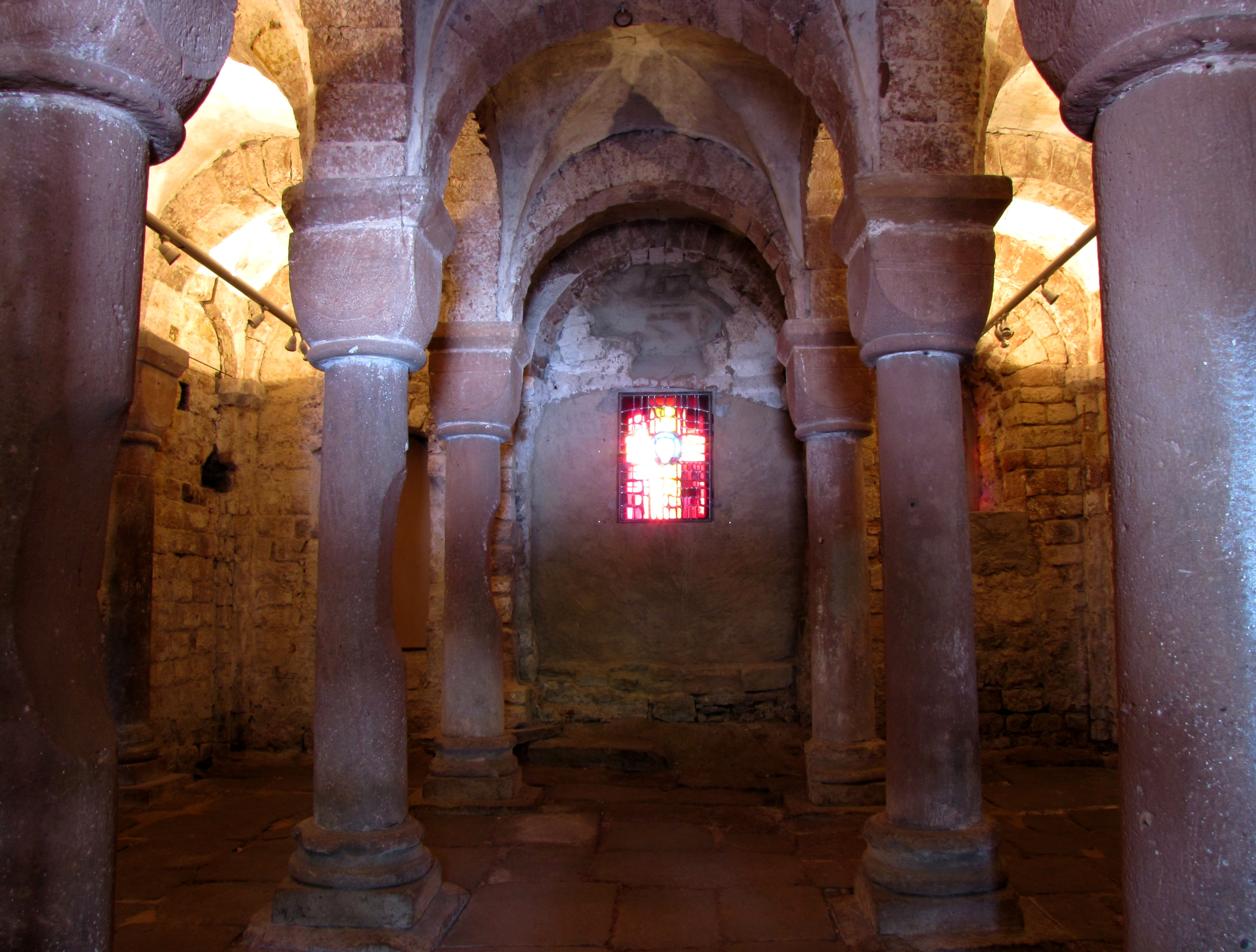

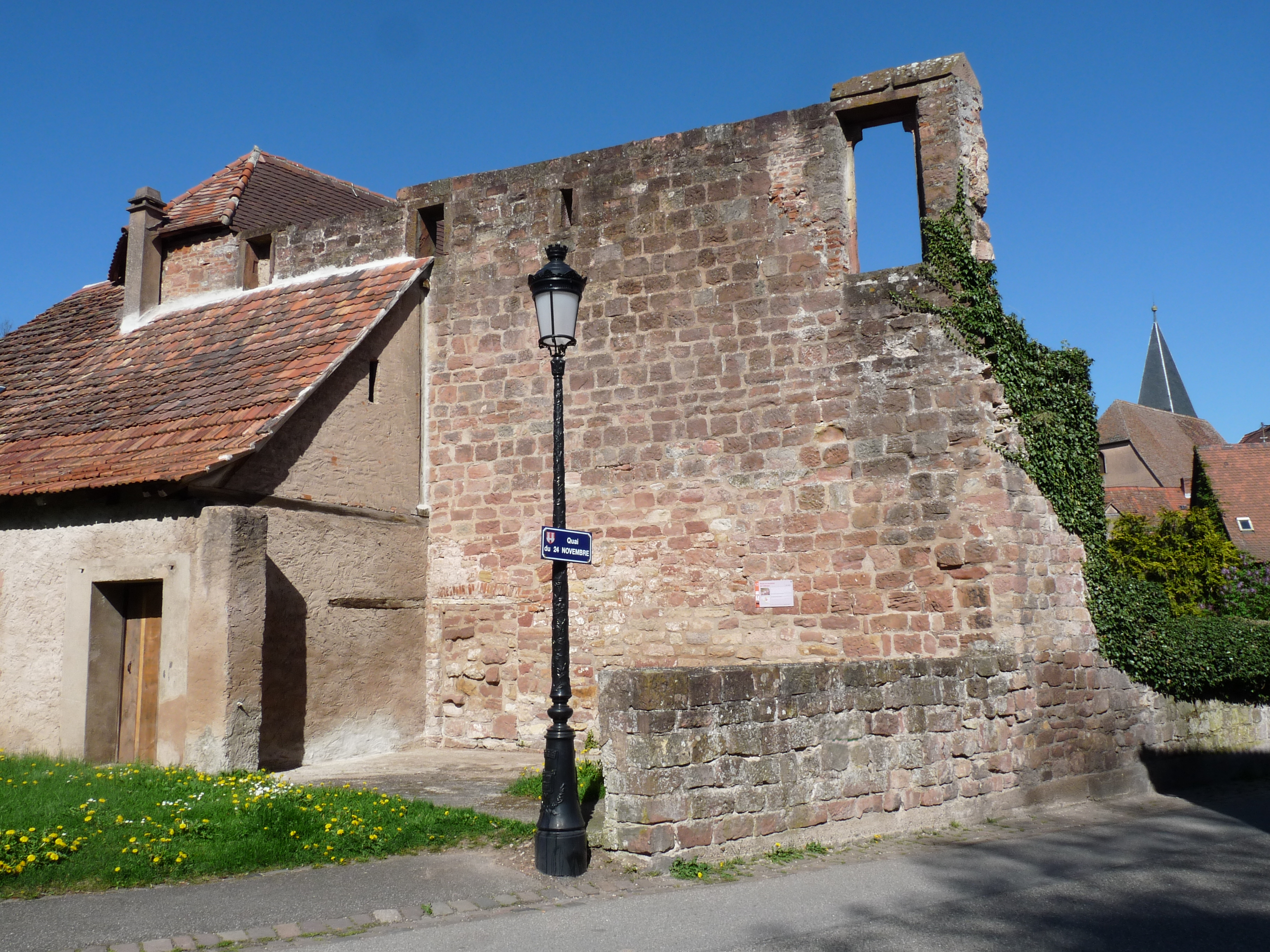

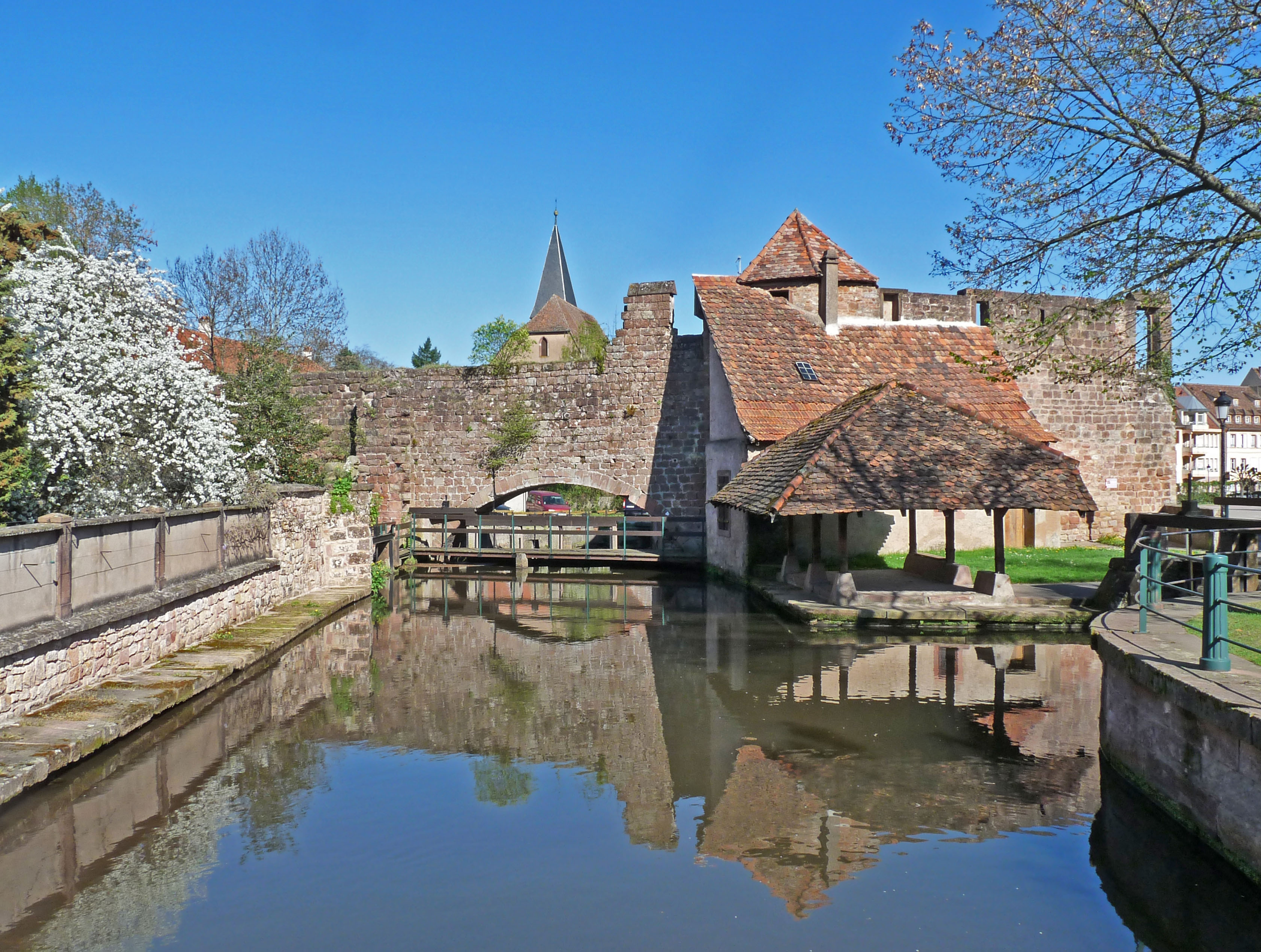

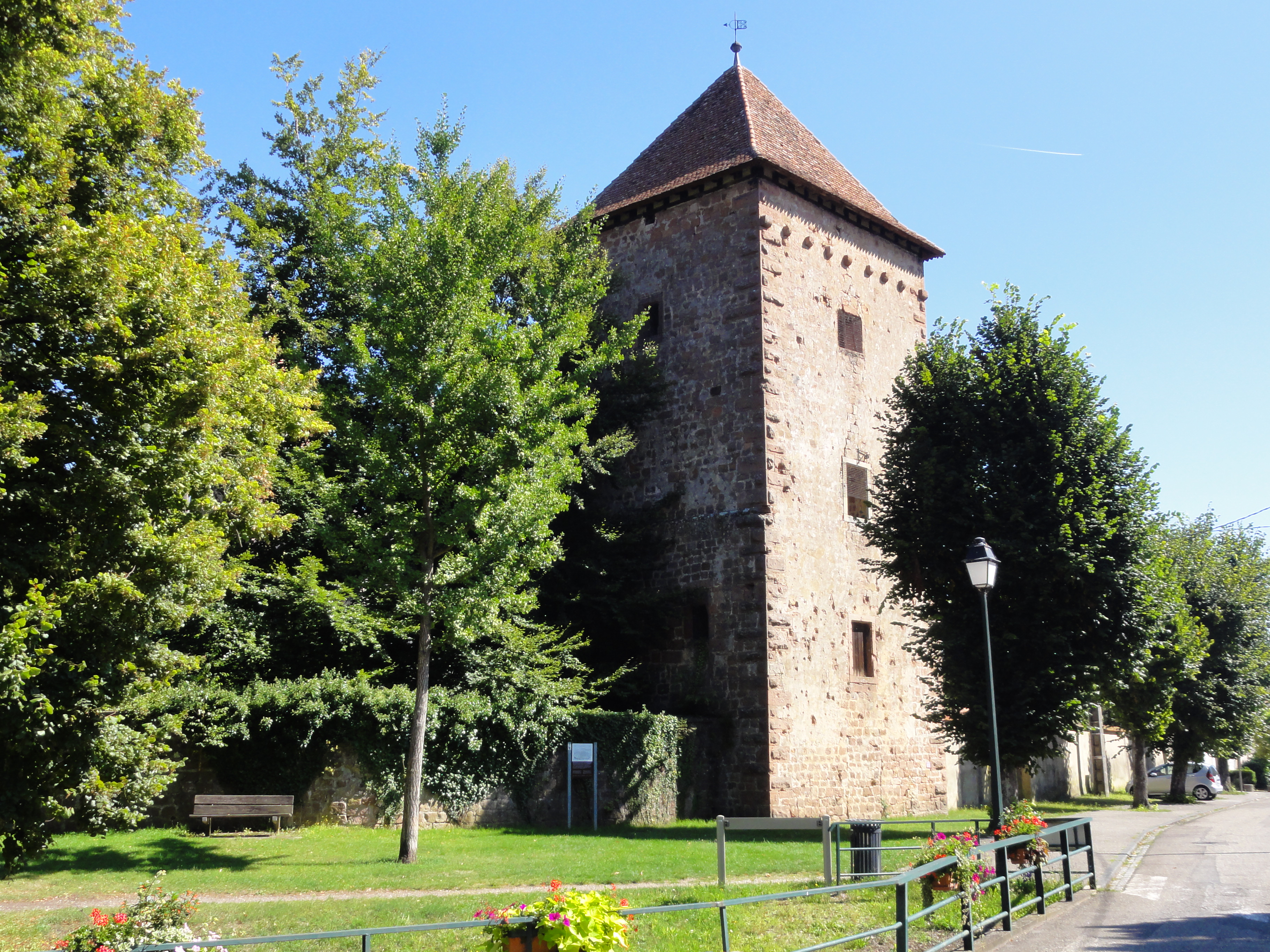

== See also ==
- St. Peter and St. Paul's Church, Wissembourg

== Literature ==
- Martin Burkart: Durmersheim. Die Geschichte des Dorfes und seiner Bewohner. Von den Anfängen bis ins frühe 20. Jahrhundert. Selbstverlag, Durmersheim 2002.
- Christoph Dette (ed.): Liber Possessionum Wizenburgensis. (Quellen und Abhandlungen zur mittelrheinischen Kirchengeschichte, Bd. 59). Mainz 1987.
- Anton Doll (ed.): Traditiones Wizenburgenses. Die Urkunden des Klosters Weissenburg. 661-864. Eingeleitet und aus dem Nachlass von Karl Glöckner hrsg. von Anton Doll. Hessische Historische Kommission, Darmstadt 1979.
- Wilhelm Harster: Der Güterbesitz des Klosters Weißenburg. (Programm zum Jahresbericht des K. Humanistischen Gymnasiums Speier), 2 Bände. Speyer 1893-1894.
- Ernst Friedrich Mooyer: Nekrologium des Klosters Weißenburg, mit Erläuterungen und Zugaben. In: Archiv des historischen Vereines von Unterfranken und Aschaffenburg 13 (1855), S. 1-67.
- Wolfgang Schultz: Der Codex Berwartstein des Klosters Weißenburg im Elsaß. (1319) 1343-1489. Neustadt an der Weinstraße 2008, ISBN 978-3-9810865-5-3 (mit Edition).
- J. Rheinwald: L' abbaye et la ville de Wissembourg. Avec quelques châteaux-forts de la basse Alsace et du Palatinat. Monographie historique. Wentzel, Wissembourg 1863 (Nachdruck: Res Universis, Paris 1992).
- Johann Caspar Zeuss (ed.): Traditiones possessionesque Wizenburgenses. Codices duo cum supplementis; impensis societatis historicae Palatinae. Speyer, 1842.
