= Weissenburg Abbey =

Weissenburg Abbey may refer to:

- Weissenburg Abbey, Alsace, a former German Benedictine monastery in Alsace, France
- Weissenburg Abbey, Bavaria, a former Carmelite monastery in Bavaria, Germany
