= Niederhorbach =

- Municipality
- Coat of arms

- Location of Niederhorbach within Südliche Weinstraße district
- Interactive map of Niederhorbach
- Location within Germany Location within Rhineland-Palatinate
- Coordinates: 49°07′03″N 8°02′03″E
- Country: Germany
- State: Rhineland-Palatinate
- District: Südliche Weinstraße
- Municipal assoc.: Bad Bergzabern

Government
  - Mayor (2019–24): Ralf Lorenz

Area
  - Total: 4.32 km^{2} (1.67 sq mi)
- Elevation: 165 m (541 ft)

Population (2025-12-31)
  - Total: 460
  - Density: 110/km^{2} (280/sq mi)
- Time zone: UTC+01:00 (CET)
  - Summer (DST): UTC+02:00 (CEST)
- Postal codes: 76889
- Dialling codes: 06343
- Vehicle registration: SÜW
- Website: www.niederhorbach.de

Niederhorbach is a municipality in Südliche Weinstraße district, in Rhineland-Palatinate, western Germany.
