= Gleiszellen-Gleishorbach =

- Municipality
- Coat of arms

- Location of Gleiszellen-Gleishorbach within Südliche Weinstraße district
- Interactive map of Gleiszellen-Gleishorbach
- Location within Germany Location within Rhineland-Palatinate
- Coordinates: 49°07′45″N 8°00′38″E
- Country: Germany
- State: Rhineland-Palatinate
- District: Südliche Weinstraße
- Municipal assoc.: Bad Bergzabern

Government
  - Mayor (2019–24): Klaus-Peter Gittler (CDU)

Area
  - Total: 5.32 km^{2} (2.05 sq mi)
- Elevation: 216 m (709 ft)

Population (2025-12-31)
  - Total: 768
  - Density: 144/km^{2} (374/sq mi)
- Time zone: UTC+01:00 (CET)
  - Summer (DST): UTC+02:00 (CEST)
- Postal codes: 76889
- Dialling codes: 06343
- Vehicle registration: SÜW
- Website: www.gleiszellen-gleishorbach.de

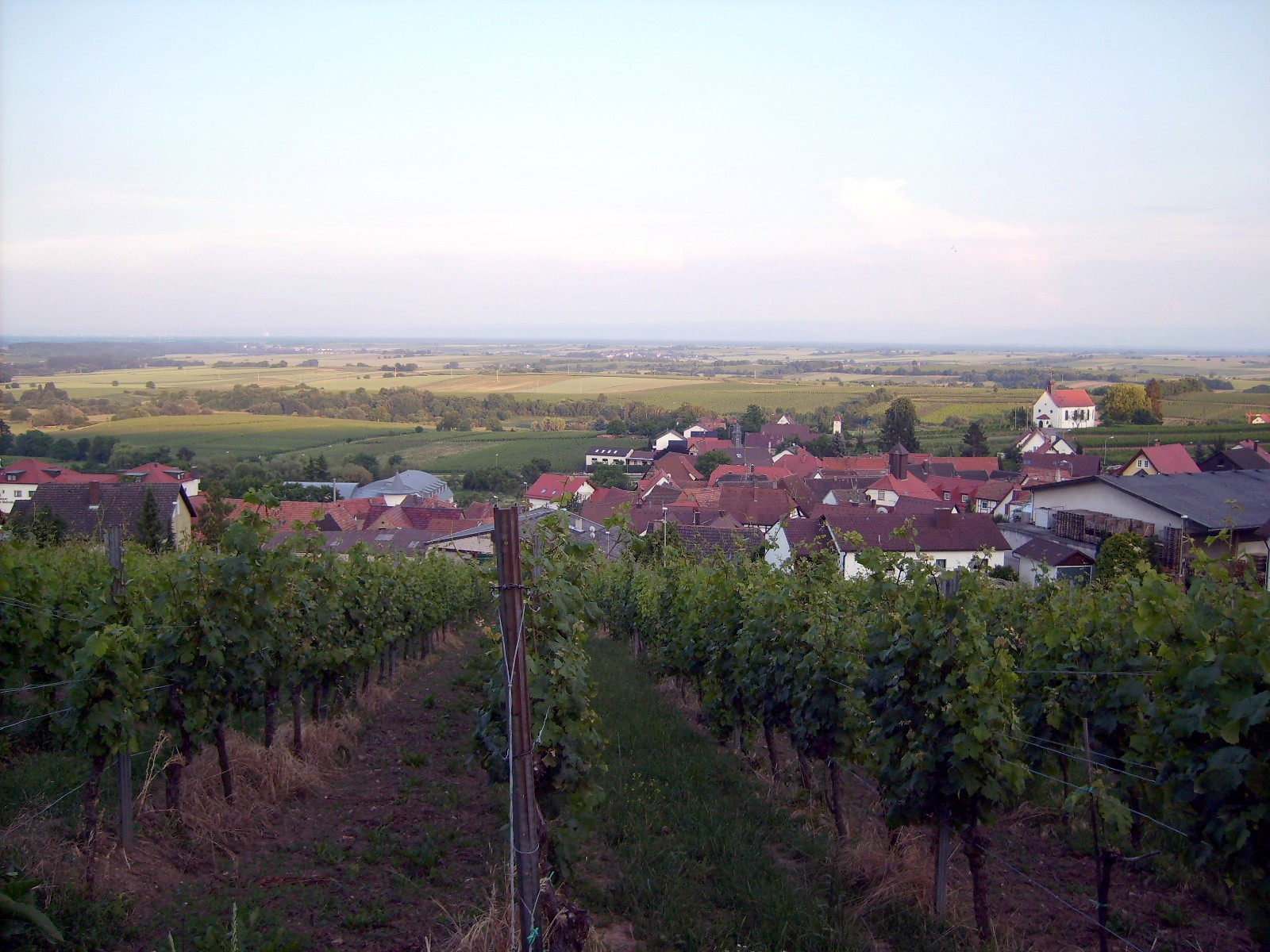
Gleiszellen viewed from Blidenfeldstraße, with the Rhine valley in the background

Gleiszellen-Gleishorbach is a municipality in Südliche Weinstraße district, in Rhineland-Palatinate, Germany. It is formed by the two villages of Gleiszellen and Gleishorbach, which, although they nowadays almost touch each other, retain distinct identities.

Gleiszellen's first mention in a historical document dates to 1136, whereas Gleishorbach first appeared in a historical record in 1304. Both sit at the bottom of a small mountain called the Hatzelberg, which overlooks the Rhine valley; Gleiszellen now also occupies a good portion of the slopes of the Hatzelberg, having expanded into what were once fields and vineyards. Gleiszellen and Gleishorbach have picturesque streets at their centers, with many old timber-frame houses. The villages are surrounded by vineyards; on their western side, they border the Pfälzerwald, which has extensive forests and hiking paths.

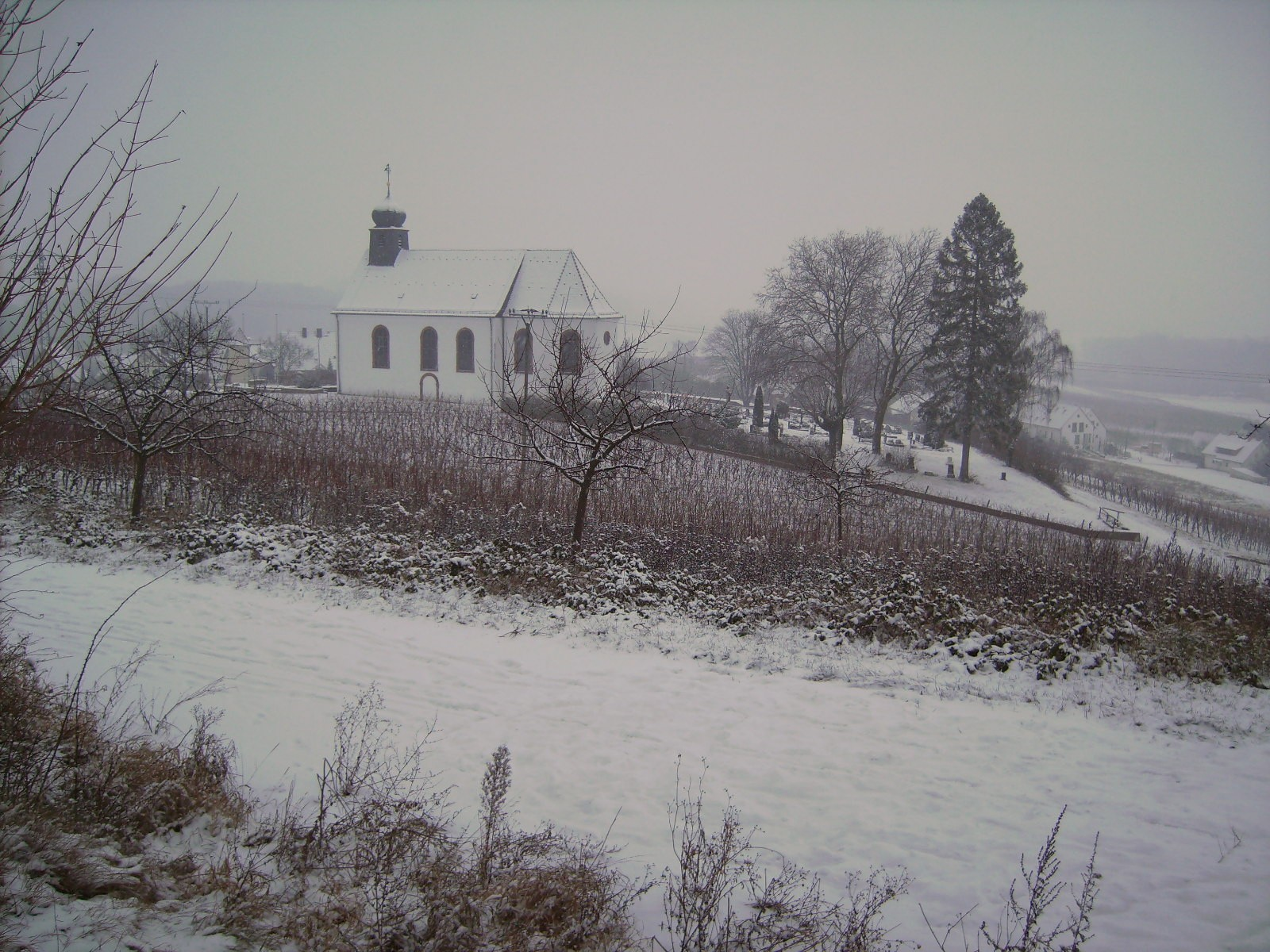
A wintry scene showing St. Dionysius, located on a hill between Gleiszellen and Gleishorbach

Historically, Gleiszellen and Gleishorbach were modest farming communities. Nowadays, wine-making (each village is home to at least half a dozen different wine-making establishments), together with tourism, has brought Gleiszellen-Gleishorbach considerable prosperity. Many of the current residents have chosen to live in Gleiszellen-Gleishorbach because of the beauty and tranquility of the place. They commute to work, for example to Landau or Karlsruhe.

Gleiszellen and Gleishorbach have numerous restaurants, guesthouses, and two hotels, but there are no shops, banks, or a post office. The villages are, however, served by a bus line that connects them with Landau to the north, and Bad Bergzabern and Wissembourg (France) to the south.
