= Landesarchiv Speyer =

German state archives

Coordinates: 49.3153°N 8.4151°E

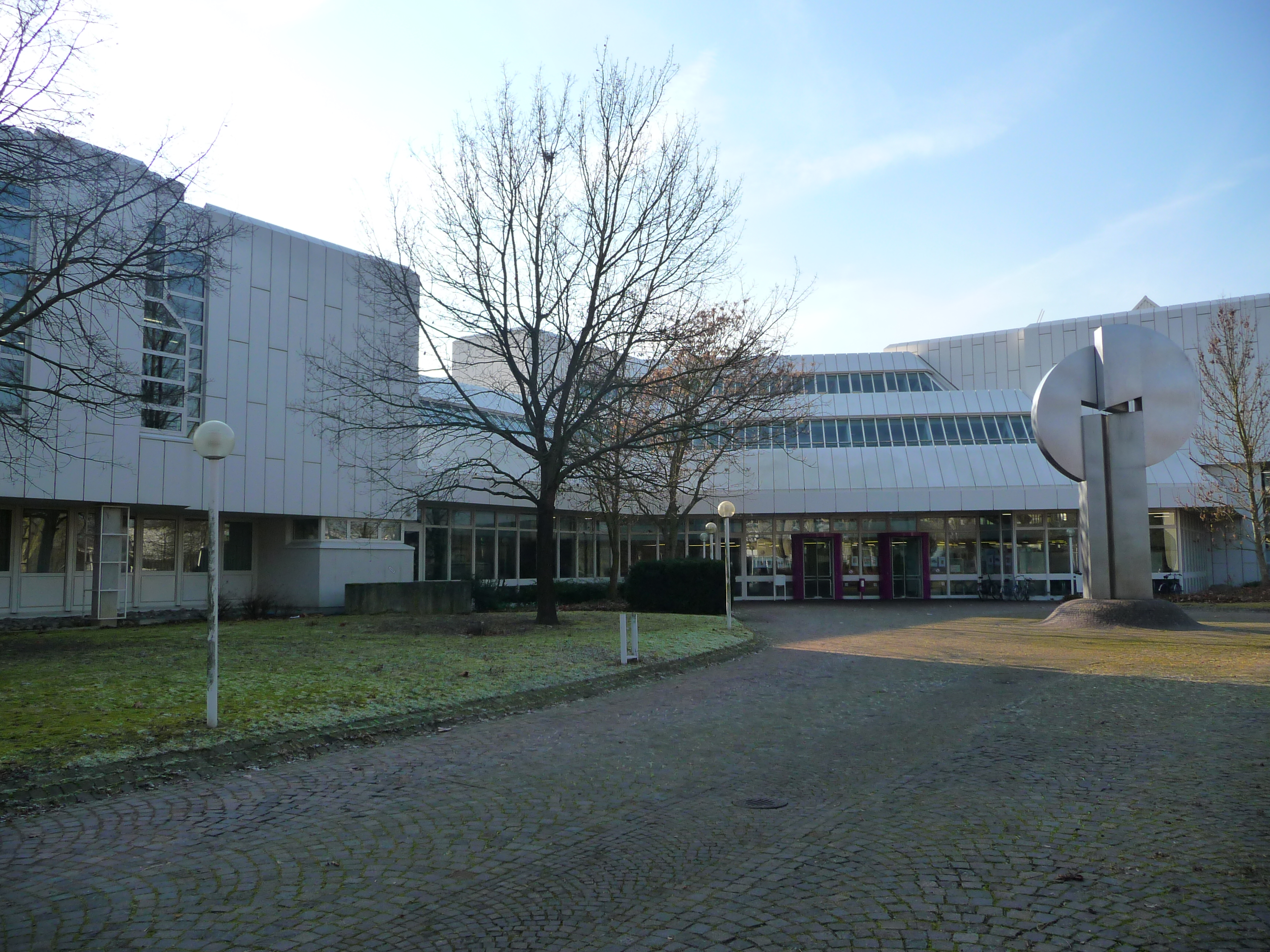
Landesarchiv Speyer and Pfälzische Landesbibliothek

The Landesarchiv Speyer is a German state archive responsible for the supervision of public authorities, public institutions and municipalities in Rheinhessen-Pfalz.

Its archives includes approximately 25,000 documents and 33,000 maps. One of its oldest archives includes a copy of the monastery of Weissenburg from the 9th century, as well as holdings from the era of the Holy Roman Empire. The archives are accessible to the general public.
