= Südliche Weinstraße =

Coordinates: 49°10′N 8°00′E

- District
- Flag Coat of arms
- Country: Germany
- State: Rhineland-Palatinate
- Capital: Landau

Government
  - District admin.: Dietmar Seefeldt (CDU)

Area
  - Total: 639.89 km^{2} (247.06 sq mi)

Population (31 December 2022)
  - Total: 112,631
  - Density: 180/km^{2} (460/sq mi)
- Time zone: UTC+01:00 (CET)
  - Summer (DST): UTC+02:00 (CEST)
- Website: www.suedliche-weinstrasse.de

Südliche Weinstraße (German: [ˌzyːtlɪçə ˈvaɪnˌʃtʁaːsə]; Palatine German: Siedlischi Woischdrooß; lit. 'Southern Wine Route') is a district (Kreis) in the south of Rhineland-Palatinate, Germany. Neighboring districts are (from west clockwise) Südwestpfalz, Bad Dürkheim, the district-free city Neustadt (Weinstraße), Rhein-Pfalz-Kreis, Germersheim, and the French département Bas-Rhin. The district-free city Landau is surrounded by the district.

== History ==
On May 27, 1832 the Hambacher Fest took place in the castle of Hambach, an event which marks the beginning of the German democracy. The district was formed in 1969 by merging the districts Landau and Bergzabern. At first the name of the new district was Landau-Bad Bergzabern, it was renamed to Südliche Weinstraße in 1978.

== Geography ==
The district is named after the first touristic route built in Germany in the 1930s, the German Wine Route (Deutsche Weinstraße). It starts in Bockenheim an der Weinstraße, goes through Bad Dürkheim, Deidesheim, and after 85 kilometers ends in Schweigen-Rechtenbach (near Bad Bergzabern).

The river Lauter forms part of the boundary with France in the south.

== Coat of arms ==
The coat of arms is very similar to that of the previous district Landau. In the top-left is the lion of the Electorate of the Palatinate. The white bar in the middle symbolizes the Weinstraße, the touristic route which gave the district its name. The bottom-right show two bunches of grapes, again symbolizing the route. The cross stands for Speyer, as the diocese of Speyer owned land in the district historically. The crown in the middle is taken from the coat of arms of the Bad Bergzabern district, symbolizing the Trifels and Annweiler areas.

== Towns and municipalities ==
Verbandsgemeinden
1. Annweiler am Trifels; 1. Albersweiler; 2. Annweiler am Trifels^{1, 2}; 3. Dernbach; 4. Eußerthal; 5. Gossersweiler-Stein; 6. Münchweiler am Klingbach; 7. Ramberg; 8. Rinnthal; 9. Silz; 10. Völkersweiler; 11. Waldhambach; 12. Waldrohrbach; 13. Wernersberg; 2. Bad Bergzabern; 1. Bad Bergzabern^{1, 2}; 2. Barbelroth; 3. Birkenhördt; 4. Böllenborn; 5. Dierbach; 6. Dörrenbach; 7. Gleiszellen-Gleishorbach; 8. Hergersweiler; 9. Kapellen-Drusweiler; 10. Kapsweyer; 11. Klingenmünster; 12. Niederhorbach; 13. Niederotterbach; 14. Oberhausen; 15. Oberotterbach; 16. Oberschlettenbach; 17. Pleisweiler-Oberhofen; 18. Schweigen-Rechtenbach; 19. Schweighofen; 20. Steinfeld; 21. Vorderweidenthal	3. Edenkoben; 1. Altdorf; 2. Böbingen; 3. Burrweiler; 4. Edenkoben^{1, 2}; 5. Edesheim; 6. Flemlingen; 7. Freimersheim; 8. Gleisweiler; 9. Gommersheim; 10. Großfischlingen; 11. Hainfeld; 12. Kleinfischlingen; 13. Rhodt unter Rietburg; 14. Roschbach; 15. Venningen; 16. Weyher in der Pfalz; 4. Herxheim; 1. Herxheim bei Landau/Pfalz^{1}; 2. Herxheimweyher; 3. Insheim; 4. Rohrbach	5. Landau-Land [seat: Landau in der Pfalz]; 1. Billigheim-Ingenheim; 2. Birkweiler; 3. Böchingen; 4. Eschbach; 5. Frankweiler; 6. Göcklingen; 7. Heuchelheim-Klingen; 8. Ilbesheim bei Landau in der Pfalz; 9. Impflingen; 10. Knöringen; 11. Leinsweiler; 12. Ranschbach; 13. Siebeldingen; 14. Walsheim; 6. Maikammer; 1. Kirrweiler; 2. Maikammer^{1}; 3. Sankt Martin; 7. Offenbach an der Queich; 1. Bornheim; 2. Essingen; 3. Hochstadt; 4. Offenbach an der Queich^{1}
^{1}seat of the Verbandsgemeinde; ^{2}town

== See also ==
- Südliche Weinstraße Wildlife Park
