= Pleisweiler-Oberhofen =

- Municipality
- Coat of arms

- Location of Pleisweiler-Oberhofen within Südliche Weinstraße district
- Interactive map of Pleisweiler-Oberhofen
- Location within Germany Location within Rhineland-Palatinate
- Coordinates: 49°07′06″N 8°00′24″E
- Country: Germany
- State: Rhineland-Palatinate
- District: Südliche Weinstraße
- Municipal assoc.: Bad Bergzabern
- Subdivisions: 2

Government
  - Mayor (2019–24): Roland Gruschinski

Area
  - Total: 5.05 km^{2} (1.95 sq mi)
- Elevation: 190 m (620 ft)

Population (2025-12-31)
  - Total: 831
  - Density: 165/km^{2} (426/sq mi)
- Time zone: UTC+01:00 (CET)
  - Summer (DST): UTC+02:00 (CEST)
- Postal codes: 76889
- Dialling codes: 06343
- Vehicle registration: SÜW
- Website: www.pleisweiler-oberhofen.de

Pleisweiler-Oberhofen is a municipality in Südliche Weinstraße district, in Rhineland-Palatinate, western Germany.
