= Hergersweiler =

- Municipality
- Coat of arms

- Location of Hergersweiler within Südliche Weinstraße district
- Interactive map of Hergersweiler
- Location within Germany Location within Rhineland-Palatinate
- Coordinates: 49°05′54″N 8°05′26″E
- Country: Germany
- State: Rhineland-Palatinate
- District: Südliche Weinstraße
- Municipal assoc.: Bad Bergzabern

Government
  - Mayor (2019–24): Helmut Heib

Area
  - Total: 1.8 km^{2} (0.69 sq mi)
- Elevation: 140 m (460 ft)

Population (2025-12-31)
  - Total: 228
  - Density: 130/km^{2} (330/sq mi)
- Time zone: UTC+01:00 (CET)
  - Summer (DST): UTC+02:00 (CEST)
- Postal codes: 76872
- Dialling codes: 06349
- Vehicle registration: SÜW
- Website: hergersweiler.de

Hergersweiler (German pronunciation: [ˈhɛʁɡɐsvaɪlɐ]) is a municipality in the Südliche Weinstraße district, in Rhineland-Palatinate, western Germany.
