= Bad Bergzabern (Verbandsgemeinde) =

- Verbandsgemeinde
- Location of Bad Bergzabern within Südliche Weinstraße district
- Interactive map of Bad Bergzabern
- Location within Germany Location within Rhineland-Palatinate
- Coordinates: 49°06′N 8°00′E
- Country: Germany
- State: Rhineland-Palatinate
- District: Südliche Weinstraße
- Seat: Bad Bergzabern
- Subdivisions: 21 municipalities

Area
  - Total: 164.61 km^{2} (63.56 sq mi)

Population (2025-12-31)
  - Total: 24,393
  - Density: 148.19/km^{2} (383.80/sq mi)
- Time zone: UTC+01:00 (CET)
  - Summer (DST): UTC+02:00 (CEST)
- Website: www.vg-bad-bergzabern.de

Bad Bergzabern is a Verbandsgemeinde ("collective municipality") in the Südliche Weinstraße district, in Rhineland-Palatinate, Germany. The seat of the municipality is in Bad Bergzabern.

The Verbandsgemeinde Bad Bergzabern consists of the following Ortsgemeinden ("local municipalities"):

1. Bad Bergzabern
2. Barbelroth
3. Birkenhördt
4. Böllenborn
5. Dierbach
6. Dörrenbach
7. Gleiszellen-Gleishorbach
8. Hergersweiler
9. Kapellen-Drusweiler
10. Kapsweyer
11. Klingenmünster
12. Niederhorbach
13. Niederotterbach
14. Oberhausen
15. Oberotterbach
16. Oberschlettenbach
17. Pleisweiler-Oberhofen
18. Schweigen-Rechtenbach
19. Schweighofen
20. Steinfeld
21. Vorderweidenthal
