= Kapellen-Drusweiler =

- Municipality
- Coat of arms

- Location of Kapellen-Drusweiler within Südliche Weinstraße district
- Interactive map of Kapellen-Drusweiler
- Location within Germany Location within Rhineland-Palatinate
- Coordinates: 49°06′18″N 8°01′49″E
- Country: Germany
- State: Rhineland-Palatinate
- District: Südliche Weinstraße
- Municipal assoc.: Bad Bergzabern

Government
  - Mayor (2019–24): Gerd Kropfinger (CDU)

Area
  - Total: 5.77 km^{2} (2.23 sq mi)
- Elevation: 159 m (522 ft)

Population (2025-12-31)
  - Total: 986
  - Density: 171/km^{2} (443/sq mi)
- Time zone: UTC+01:00 (CET)
  - Summer (DST): UTC+02:00 (CEST)
- Postal codes: 76889
- Dialling codes: 06343
- Vehicle registration: SÜW
- Website: www.kapellen-drusweiler.de

Kapellen-Drusweiler is a municipality in Südliche Weinstraße district, in Rhineland-Palatinate, western Germany.

== Geography ==
The wine village of Kapellen-Drusweiler is a linear village, between the Palatinate Forest and the Rhine. The parish of Kapellen-Drusweiler includes the villages of Deutschhof, Eichenhöfe und Kaplaneihof. Deutschhof was founded by Swiss immigrants.

== History ==
Drusweiler was first mentioned in 1179. Around 1200, Klingenmünster Abbey build a chapel opposite the Church in Drusweiler. Around it there developed an independent settlement called Kapellen. The Duke of Palatinate-Zweibrücken united the two communities in 1410.

== Religion ==
In 2007 52 percent of the inhabitants were Protestant and 24,8 percent Catholic. The remainder belong to other religions or were unaffiliated with any religion.

== Politics ==
=== Municipal council ===
The municipal council in Kapellen-Drusweiler comprises twelve councilors, elected by proportional representation local elections on 7 June 2009, together with the voluntary position of Mayor.

Distribution of seats in municipal elections:

	SPD	CDU	FDP	FWG	Total
2009	3	4	2	3	12 Seats
2004	3	4	2	3	12 Seats

=== Coat of arms ===
The blazon of the coat of arms reads: "Von Schwarz und Gold gespalten, rechts eine goldene Pflugschar, links ein schwarzes Sesel" (Divided into black and gold, a golden ploughshare right, a black winemakers' knife left).

It was approved in 1981 by the Neustadt district government and goes back to a seal dating from 1744.
