= Klingenmünster Abbey =

Monastery in Germany

Coordinates: 49°08′27″N 8°01′12″E

- Interactive map of Klingenmünster Abbey

Monastery information
- Order: Benedictine
- Established: likely 626

People
- Founder: likely Dagobert I

Site
- Location: Klingenmünster, Germany

Klingenmünster Abbey (German: Reichskloster Klingenmünster) was a Benedictine monastery in the village of Klingenmünster in Bad Bergzabern, Rhineland-Palatinate, Germany.

== History ==
All the abbey's documents were destroyed in the fire of 840, leaving its foundation and earlier history obscure. It seems likely that it began as a foundation of Dagobert I for monks under the Rule of Saint Columbanus in 626. It was certainly in existence by 780 under Fleido as abbot, later Bishop of Speyer. In 840 the monastery burnt down and the request of the monks for funds for its re-building, addressed to Otkar, Archbishop of Mainz, previously abbot of Klingenmünster, constitutes the first direct documentary evidence.

It was an Imperial abbey by the time of Hatto I, in the 9th century.

In the 11th century a monk of Klingenmünster, Gottschalk, brought the abbey to prominence by his appointment as notary to Emperor Henry IV in the Imperial chancery between 1071 and 1084.

In the 12th century Abbot Stephan (in office from 1094 to 1114), originally from Ebersheim Abbey and also abbot of Weissenburg, Selz and Limburg Abbeys before in addition becoming abbot of Klingenmünster, significantly increased the abbey's possessions by attracting donations and grants of land and by advantageous land purchases, which in turn increased the abbey's standing and influence.

In 1115 Adalbert I, Archbishop-Elector of Mainz (and brother of Frederick, Count of Saarbrücken), freed the abbey of all royal, episcopal and advocatial services and impositions. This seems however to have been with a view to removing obstacles to the easy advancement of Adalbert's own kindred within the abbey. By the beginning of the 13th century most of its territories and possessions had been transferred into the hands of his relatives, the Counts of Leiningen and Zweibrücken.

In 1223 Pope Honorius III placed the abbey under direct papal protection, but its position was irretrievably lost. It now served as a place of accommodation for the younger sons of the local nobility, and by the latter half of the 15th century had lost any semblance of discipline or adherence to any Rule. Repeated warnings from various bishops failed to bring about the necessary reforms or halt the decline.

By 1490 the community contained only four members and on 18 November 1490 Pope Innocent VIII ordered its conversion into a secular collegiate foundation (Stift). The last abbot, Eucharius von Weingarten, became the first prior.

It suffered considerable loss in the time of Johann, the third prior (from 1499 to 1506) from a Bavarian feud and the Landshut War of Succession, and in order to stave off financial ruin much of its remaining property had to be mortgaged. Despite an Imperial writ of protection, the Stift was sacked in the German Peasants' War of 1525 by the peasantry of Pleisweiler and Oberhofen. Finally, when the Reformation was introduced into the Electorate of the Palatinate between 1565 and 1567, Klingenmünster was secularised and its few remaining assets transferred to the Elector.

The premises were demolished except for the church, which remains as the parish church of St. Michael and was re-modelled in the 18th century in the Baroque style.

== Sources ==
- Festschrift des katholischen Stiftspfarramts St. Michael, Klingenmünster, 1995
