= Niederotterbach =

- Municipality
- Coat of arms

- Location of Niederotterbach within Südliche Weinstraße district
- Interactive map of Niederotterbach
- Location within Germany Location within Rhineland-Palatinate
- Coordinates: 49°03′37″N 8°02′44″E
- Country: Germany
- State: Rhineland-Palatinate
- District: Südliche Weinstraße
- Municipal assoc.: Bad Bergzabern

Government
  - Mayor (2019–24): Rudolf Schwöbel

Area
  - Total: 3.58 km^{2} (1.38 sq mi)
- Elevation: 151 m (495 ft)

Population (2025-12-31)
  - Total: 331
  - Density: 92.5/km^{2} (239/sq mi)
- Time zone: UTC+01:00 (CET)
  - Summer (DST): UTC+02:00 (CEST)
- Postal codes: 76889
- Dialling codes: 06340
- Vehicle registration: SÜW
- Website: www.niederotterbach.de

Niederotterbach is a municipality in Südliche Weinstraße district, in Rhineland-Palatinate, western Germany.

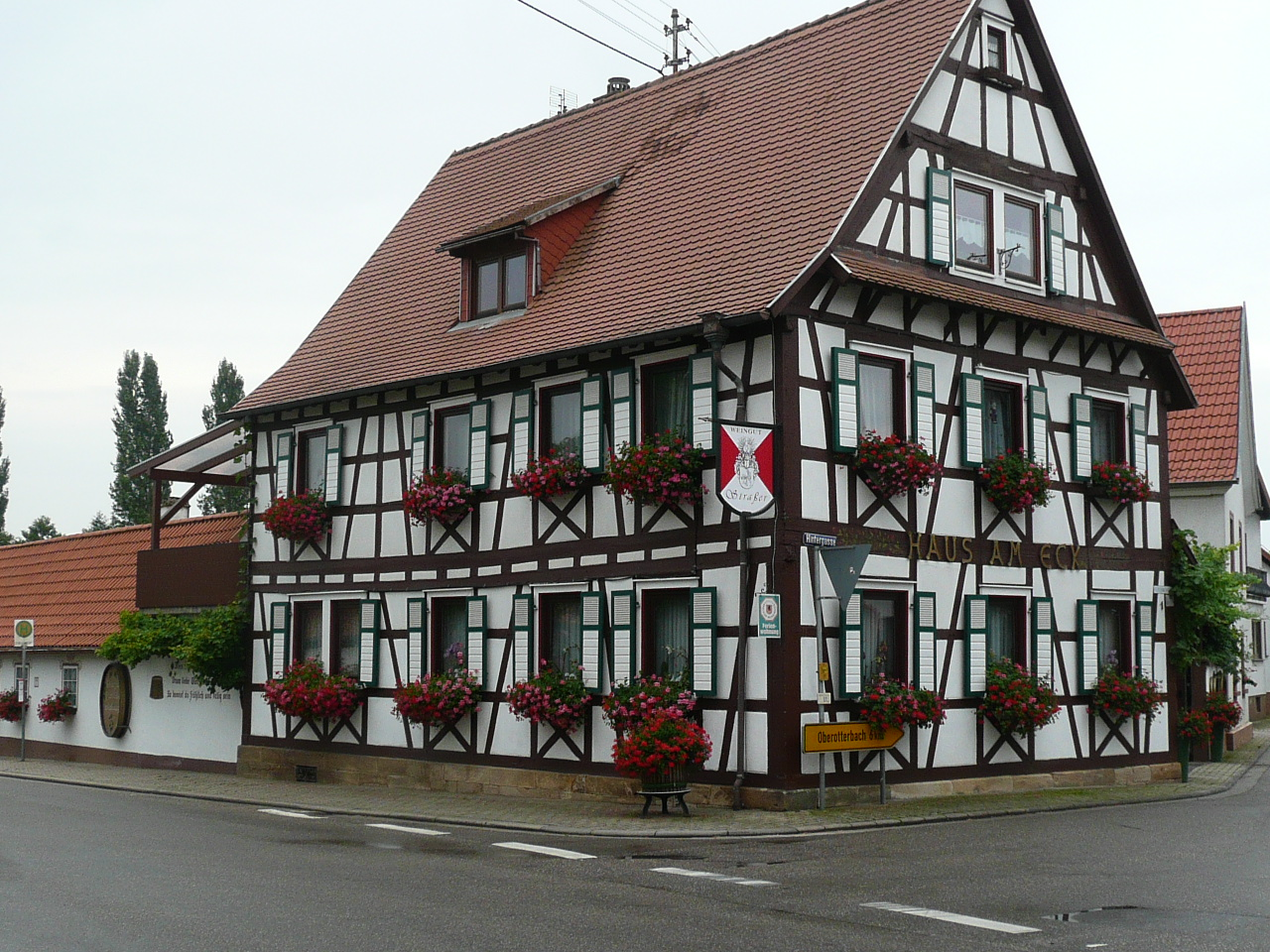
Timber frame "Haus am Eck"
