= Dierbach =

- Municipality
- Coat of arms

- Location of Dierbach within Südliche Weinstraße district
- Interactive map of Dierbach
- Location within Germany Location within Rhineland-Palatinate
- Coordinates: 49°05′01″N 8°04′08″E
- Country: Germany
- State: Rhineland-Palatinate
- District: Südliche Weinstraße
- Municipal assoc.: Bad Bergzabern

Government
  - Mayor (2019–24): Manfred Huckle

Area
  - Total: 5.48 km^{2} (2.12 sq mi)
- Elevation: 146 m (479 ft)

Population (2025-12-31)
  - Total: 565
  - Density: 103/km^{2} (267/sq mi)
- Time zone: UTC+01:00 (CET)
  - Summer (DST): UTC+02:00 (CEST)
- Postal codes: 76889
- Dialling codes: 06340
- Vehicle registration: SÜW
- Website: www.gemeinde-dierbach.de

Dierbach (German pronunciation: [ˈdiːɐ̯ˌbax]) is a municipality in the Südliche Weinstraße district, in Rhineland-Palatinate, Germany.
