= Oberschlettenbach =

- Municipality
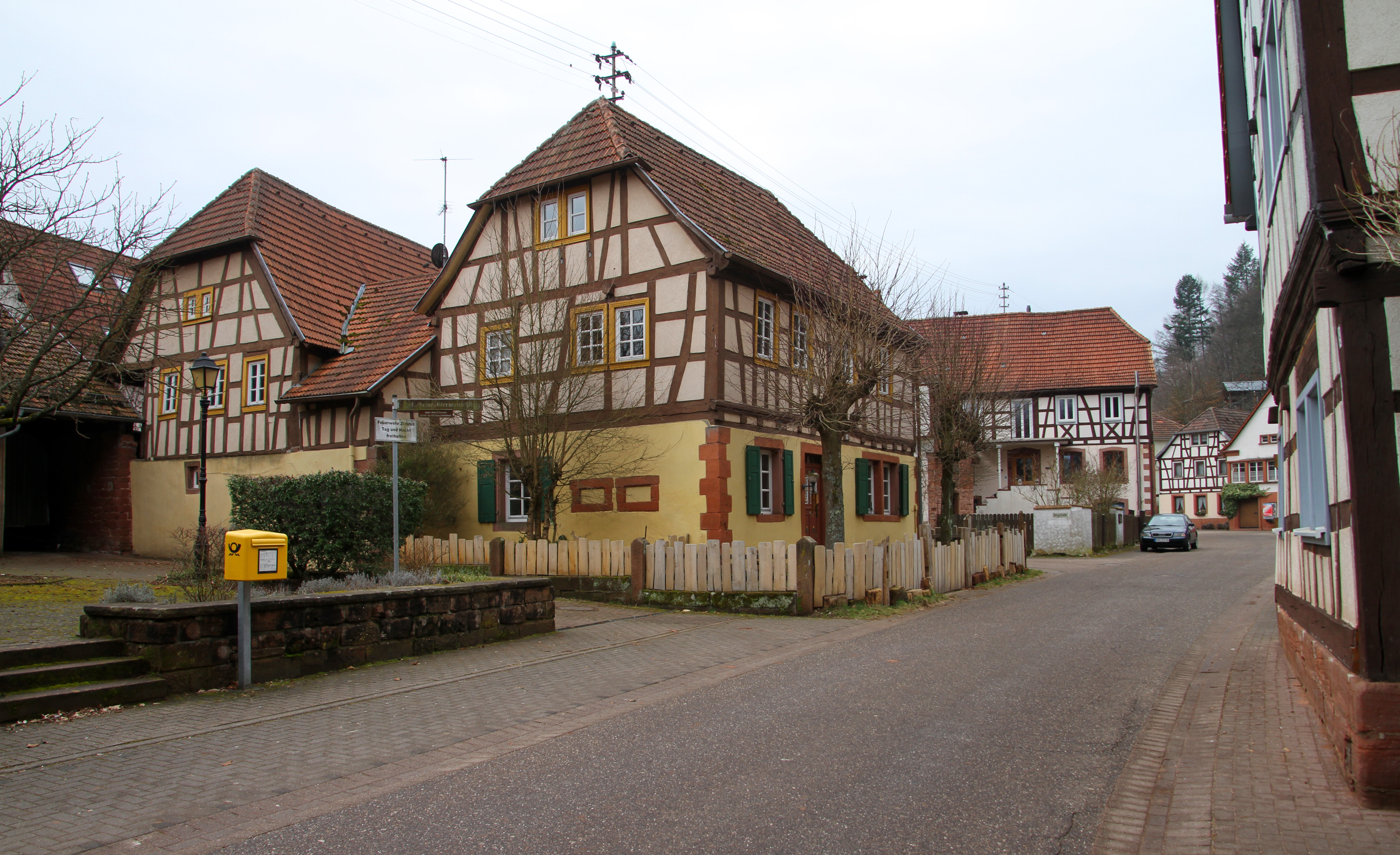

- Coat of arms

- Location of Oberschlettenbach within Südliche Weinstraße district
- Interactive map of Oberschlettenbach
- Location within Germany Location within Rhineland-Palatinate
- Coordinates: 49°08′45″N 7°52′23″E
- Country: Germany
- State: Rhineland-Palatinate
- District: Südliche Weinstraße
- Municipal assoc.: Bad Bergzabern

Government
  - Mayor (2019–24): Christian Burkhart

Area
  - Total: 4.58 km^{2} (1.77 sq mi)
- Elevation: 250 m (820 ft)

Population (2025-12-31)
  - Total: 118
  - Density: 25.8/km^{2} (66.7/sq mi)
- Time zone: UTC+01:00 (CET)
  - Summer (DST): UTC+02:00 (CEST)
- Postal codes: 76889
- Dialling codes: 06343
- Vehicle registration: SÜW
- Website: www.oberschlettenbach.de

Oberschlettenbach is a municipality in Südliche Weinstraße district, in Rhineland-Palatinate, western Germany.
