= Oberhausen, Südliche Weinstraße =

Oberhausen
- Municipality
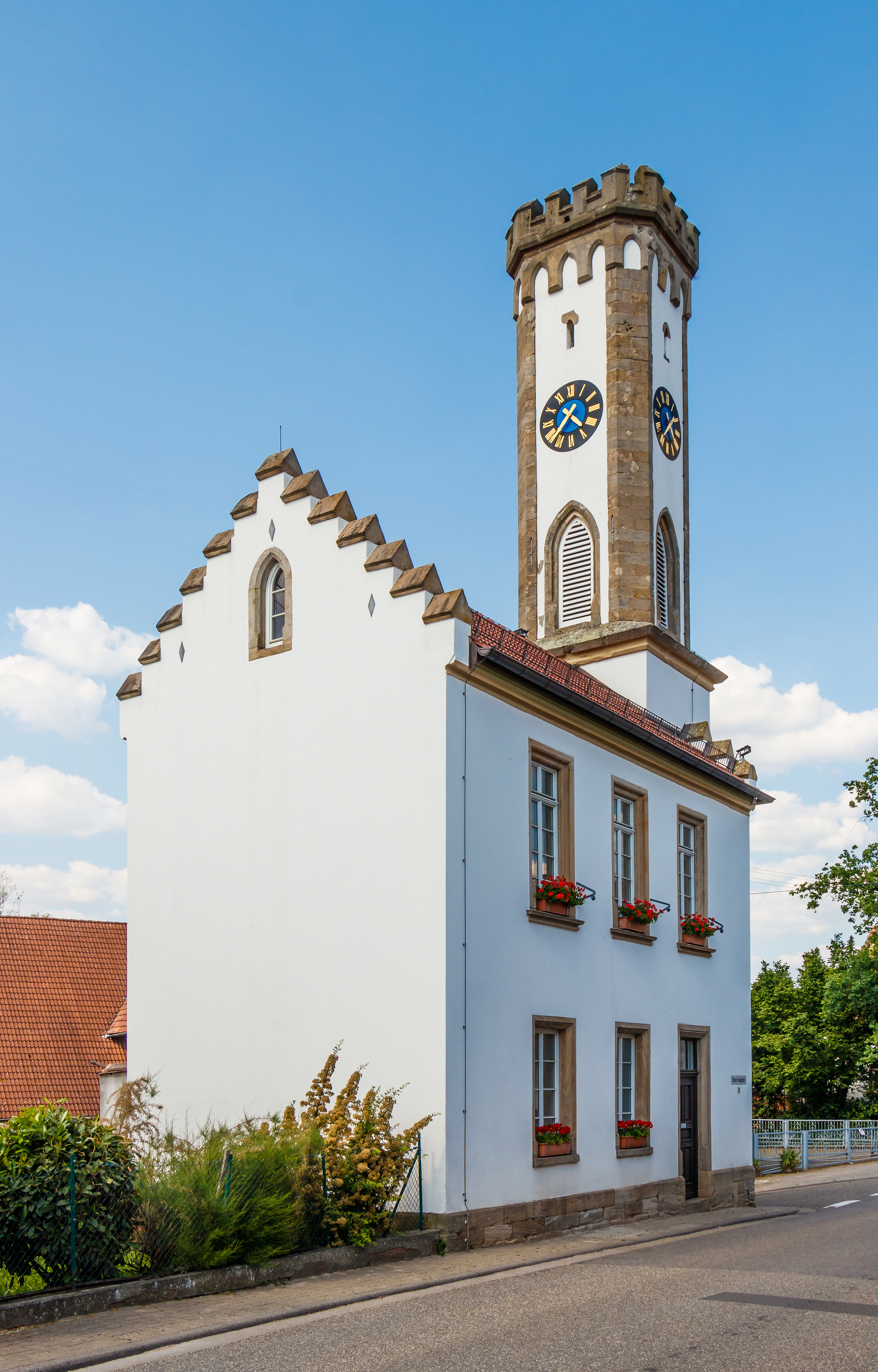
- Town hall

- Coat of arms

- Location of Oberhausen within Südliche Weinstraße district
- Interactive map of Oberhausen
- Location within Germany Location within Rhineland-Palatinate
- Coordinates: 49°05′56″N 8°03′28″E
- Country: Germany
- State: Rhineland-Palatinate
- District: Südliche Weinstraße
- Municipal assoc.: Bad Bergzabern

Government
  - Mayor (2019–24): Jens Sprenger

Area
  - Total: 4.5 km^{2} (1.7 sq mi)
- Elevation: 145 m (476 ft)

Population (2025-12-31)
  - Total: 438
  - Density: 97/km^{2} (250/sq mi)
- Time zone: UTC+01:00 (CET)
  - Summer (DST): UTC+02:00 (CEST)
- Postal codes: 76887
- Dialling codes: 06343
- Vehicle registration: SÜW
- Website: https://oberhausen-suew.de/

Oberhausen (German pronunciation: [ˈoːbɐhaʊzn̩]) is a municipality in Südliche Weinstraße district, in Rhineland-Palatinate, western Germany.
