= Böllenborn =

- Municipality
- Location of Böllenborn within Südliche Weinstraße district
- Interactive map of Böllenborn
- Location within Germany Location within Rhineland-Palatinate
- Coordinates: 49°5′52″N 7°56′04″E
- Country: Germany
- State: Rhineland-Palatinate
- District: Südliche Weinstraße
- Municipal assoc.: Bad Bergzabern

Government
  - Mayor (2019–24): Bärbel Drieß (FW)

Area
  - Total: 4.11 km^{2} (1.59 sq mi)
- Elevation: 269 m (883 ft)

Population (2025-12-31)
  - Total: 226
  - Density: 55.0/km^{2} (142/sq mi)
- Time zone: UTC+01:00 (CET)
  - Summer (DST): UTC+02:00 (CEST)
- Postal codes: 76887
- Dialling codes: 06343
- Vehicle registration: SÜW

Böllenborn (German pronunciation: [ˈbœlənbɔʁn]) is a municipality in the Südliche Weinstraße district, in Rhineland-Palatinate, Germany.
