= Steinfeld, Rhineland-Palatinate =

Steinfeld
- Municipality
- Coat of arms

- Location of Steinfeld within Südliche Weinstraße district
- Interactive map of Steinfeld
- Location within Germany Location within Rhineland-Palatinate
- Coordinates: 49°03′01″N 8°02′17″E
- Country: Germany
- State: Rhineland-Palatinate
- District: Südliche Weinstraße
- Municipal assoc.: Bad Bergzabern
- Subdivisions: 3

Government
  - Mayor (2019–24): Matthias Neufeld (CDU)

Area
  - Total: 14.89 km^{2} (5.75 sq mi)
- Elevation: 152 m (499 ft)

Population (2025-12-31)
  - Total: 1,841
  - Density: 123.6/km^{2} (320.2/sq mi)
- Time zone: UTC+01:00 (CET)
  - Summer (DST): UTC+02:00 (CEST)
- Postal codes: 76889
- Dialling codes: 06340
- Vehicle registration: SÜW
- Website: www.steinfeld-pfalz.de

Steinfeld (German pronunciation: [ˈʃtaɪnˌfɛlt]) is a municipality in Südliche Weinstraße district, in Rhineland-Palatinate, western Germany.
