= Dörrenbach =

- Municipality
- Coat of arms

- Location of Dörrenbach within Südliche Weinstraße district
- Interactive map of Dörrenbach
- Location within Germany Location within Rhineland-Palatinate
- Coordinates: 49°5′27″N 7°57′38″E
- Country: Germany
- State: Rhineland-Palatinate
- District: Südliche Weinstraße
- Municipal assoc.: Bad Bergzabern

Government
  - Mayor (2019–24): Ralf Schmitt

Area
  - Total: 10.14 km^{2} (3.92 sq mi)
- Elevation: 295 m (968 ft)

Population (2025-12-31)
  - Total: 869
  - Density: 85.7/km^{2} (222/sq mi)
- Time zone: UTC+01:00 (CET)
  - Summer (DST): UTC+02:00 (CEST)
- Postal codes: 76889
- Dialling codes: 06343
- Vehicle registration: SÜW
- Website: www.doerrenbach.de

Dörrenbach (German pronunciation: [ˈdœʁənbax]) is a municipality in the Südliche Weinstraße district, in Rhineland-Palatinate, Germany.
