= Vorderweidenthal =

- Municipality
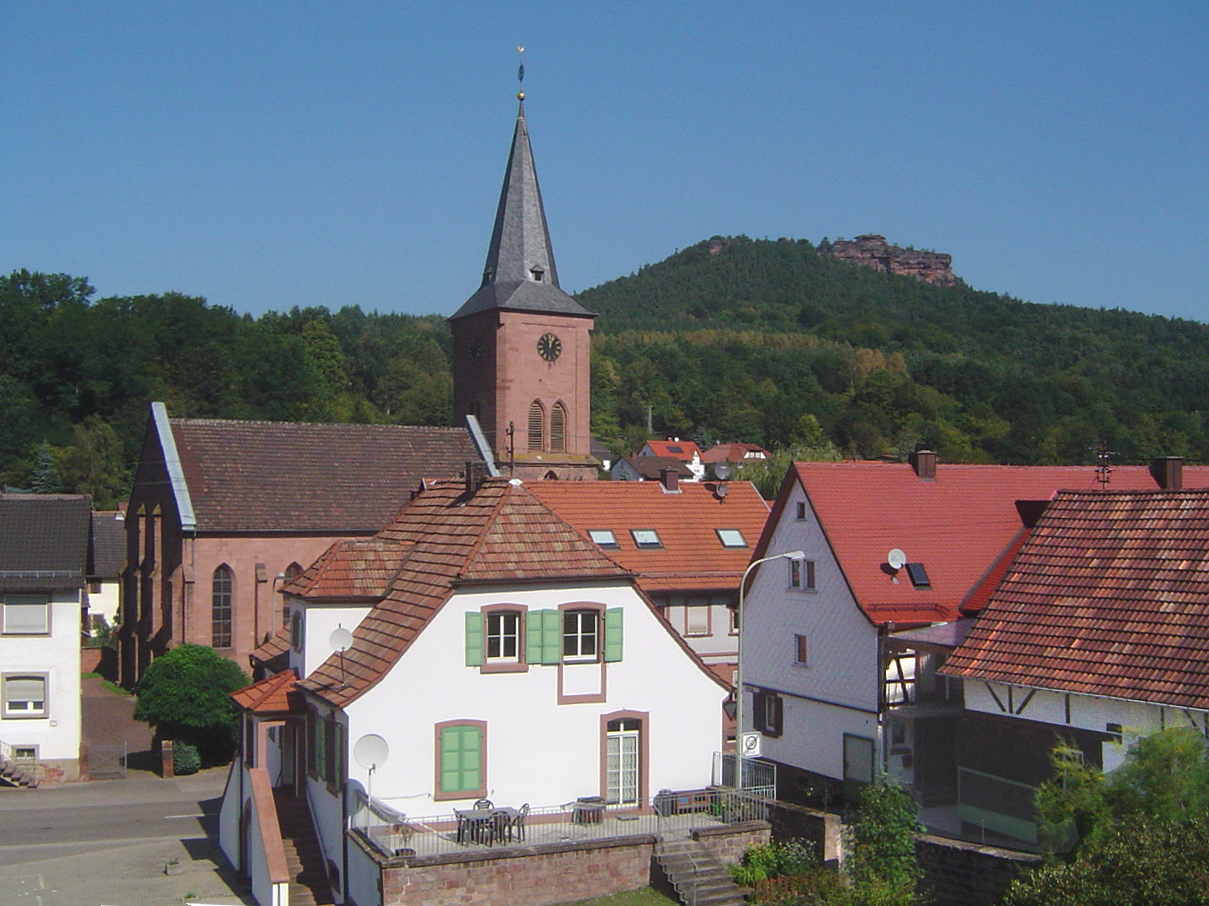

- Coat of arms

- Location of Vorderweidenthal within Südliche Weinstraße district
- Interactive map of Vorderweidenthal
- Location within Germany Location within Rhineland-Palatinate
- Coordinates: 49°07′41″N 7°52′59″E
- Country: Germany
- State: Rhineland-Palatinate
- District: Südliche Weinstraße
- Municipal assoc.: Bad Bergzabern

Government
  - Mayor (2019–24): Volker Christmann (SPD)

Area
  - Total: 10.12 km^{2} (3.91 sq mi)
- Elevation: 221 m (725 ft)

Population (2025-12-31)
  - Total: 634
  - Density: 62.6/km^{2} (162/sq mi)
- Time zone: UTC+01:00 (CET)
  - Summer (DST): UTC+02:00 (CEST)
- Postal codes: 76889
- Dialling codes: 06398
- Vehicle registration: SÜW
- Website: www.vorderweidenthal.de

Vorderweidenthal is a municipality in Südliche Weinstraße district, in Rhineland-Palatinate, Western Germany.

== History ==
=== Population and Religion ===
In 2007, 64.3 percent of the population were Protestant and 22.8 percent Catholic. The other belonged to a different religion or had no religion.

Year	Total Population	Male population	Female population	Protestant	Catholic	Other
2005	722	362	360	439	137	85
2006	695	346	349	422	138	77
2007	699	349	350	411	145	83
2008	704	357	347	405	159	80
2009	701	356	345	402	165	80
2010	696	351	345	390	163	92
2011	681	342	339	373	163	100
2012	669	333	336	359	164	105
2013	654	323	331	348	162	105
2014	649	322	327	327	162	120
2015	620	308	312	311	152	117
2016	628	315	313	306	151	133
2017	621	309	312	293	153	143
2018	616	312	304	293	147	142

Data taken from end of year information.
