= Schweighofen =

- Municipality
- Coat of arms

- Location of Schweighofen within Südliche Weinstraße district
- Interactive map of Schweighofen
- Location within Germany Location within Rhineland-Palatinate
- Coordinates: 49°02′27″N 7°59′45″E
- Country: Germany
- State: Rhineland-Palatinate
- District: Südliche Weinstraße
- Municipal assoc.: Bad Bergzabern

Government
  - Mayor (2019–24): Sarah Agne

Area
  - Total: 11.23 km^{2} (4.34 sq mi)
- Elevation: 160 m (520 ft)

Population (2025-12-31)
  - Total: 607
  - Density: 54.1/km^{2} (140/sq mi)
- Time zone: UTC+01:00 (CET)
  - Summer (DST): UTC+02:00 (CEST)
- Postal codes: 76889
- Dialling codes: 06342
- Vehicle registration: SÜW
- Website: www.schweighofen.de

Schweighofen is a municipality in Südliche Weinstraße district, in Rhineland-Palatinate, western Germany.
