= Klingenmünster =

- Municipality
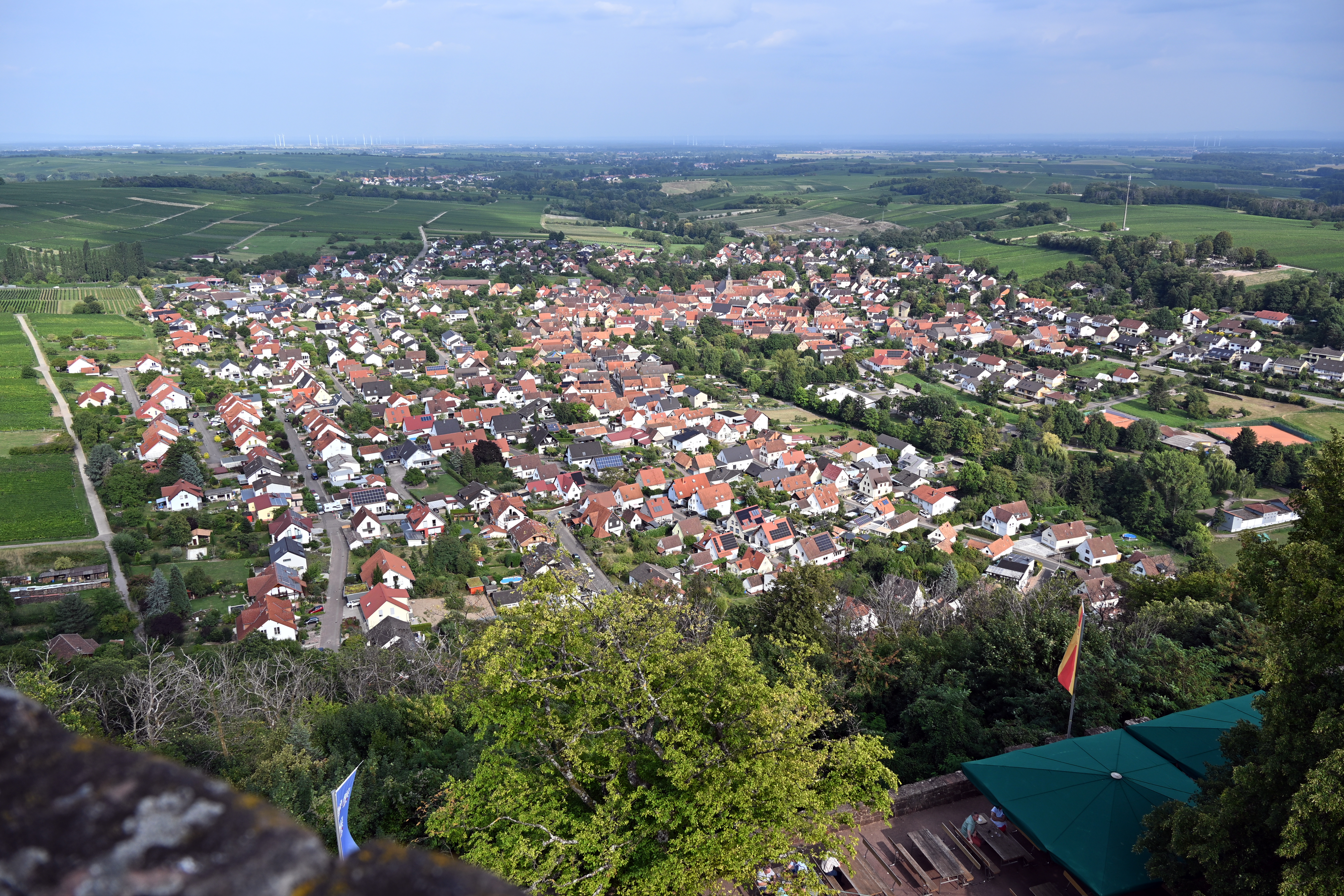
- Klingenmünster in 2025

- Coat of arms

- Location of Klingenmünster within Südliche Weinstraße district
- Interactive map of Klingenmünster
- Location within Germany Location within Rhineland-Palatinate
- Coordinates: 49°8′27″N 8°1′12″E
- Country: Germany
- State: Rhineland-Palatinate
- District: Südliche Weinstraße
- Municipal assoc.: Bad Bergzabern

Government
  - Mayor (2019–24): Kathrin Flory (SPD)

Area
  - Total: 10.72 km^{2} (4.14 sq mi)
- Elevation: 168 m (551 ft)

Population (2025-12-31)
  - Total: 2,197
  - Density: 204.9/km^{2} (530.8/sq mi)
- Time zone: UTC+01:00 (CET)
  - Summer (DST): UTC+02:00 (CEST)
- Postal codes: 76889
- Dialling codes: 06349
- Vehicle registration: SÜW
- Website: www.klingenmuenster.de

Klingenmünster is a municipality in Südliche Weinstraße district, in Rhineland-Palatinate, western Germany. It is the site of Landeck Castle and the birthplace of Michael Hahn, the 19th governor of Louisiana.

== Photo gallery ==
Klingenmünster

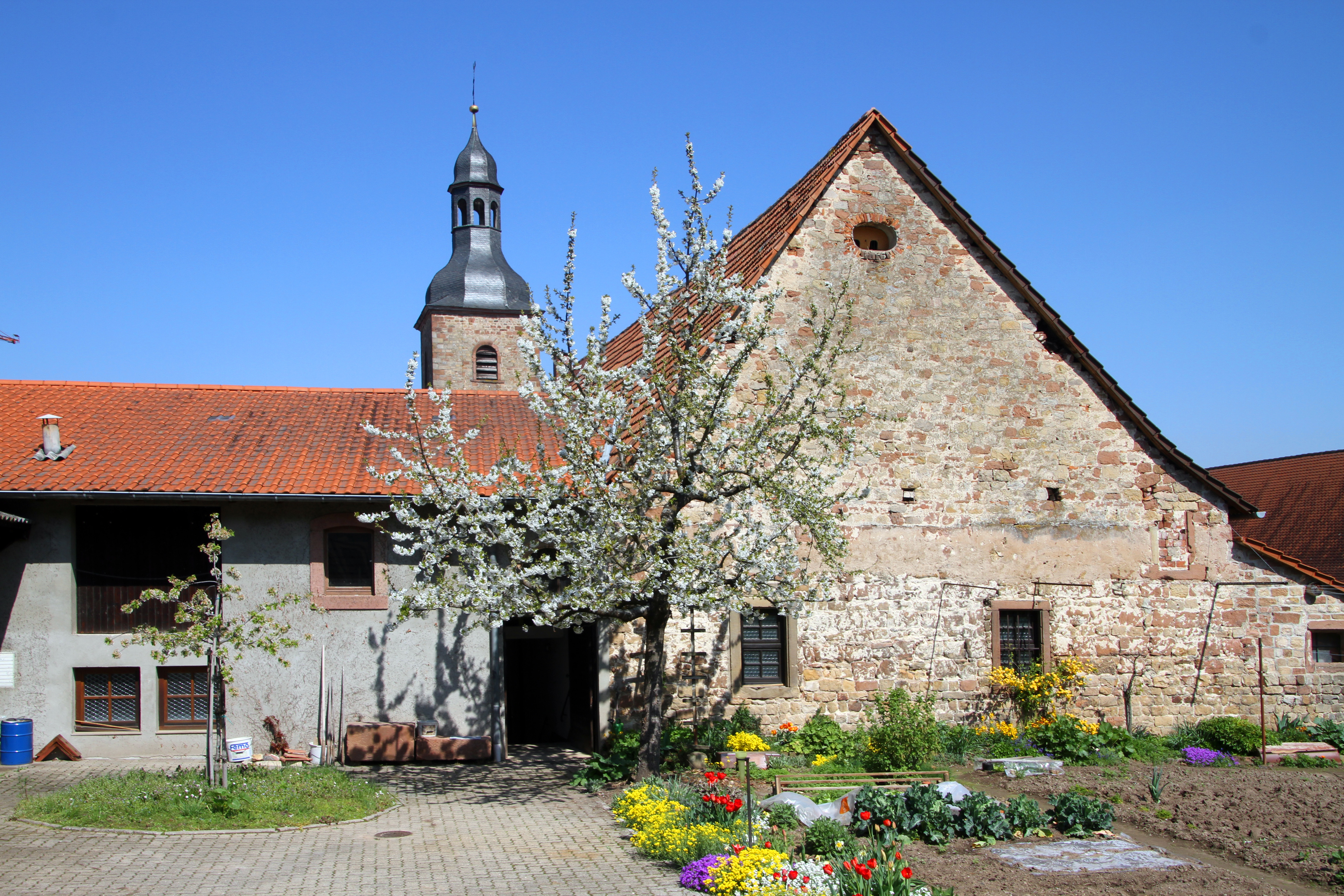
Monastery

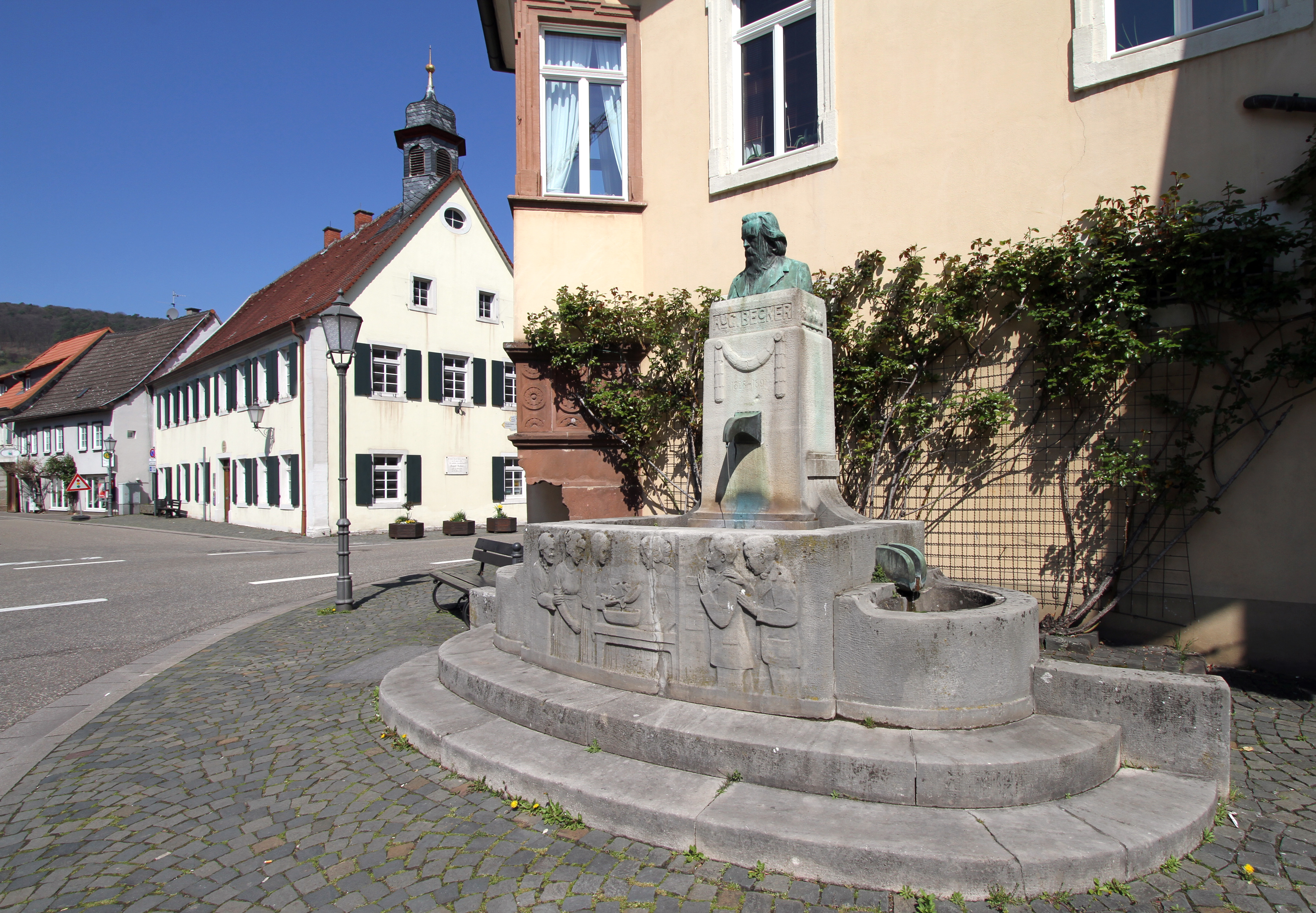
Memorial for August Becker

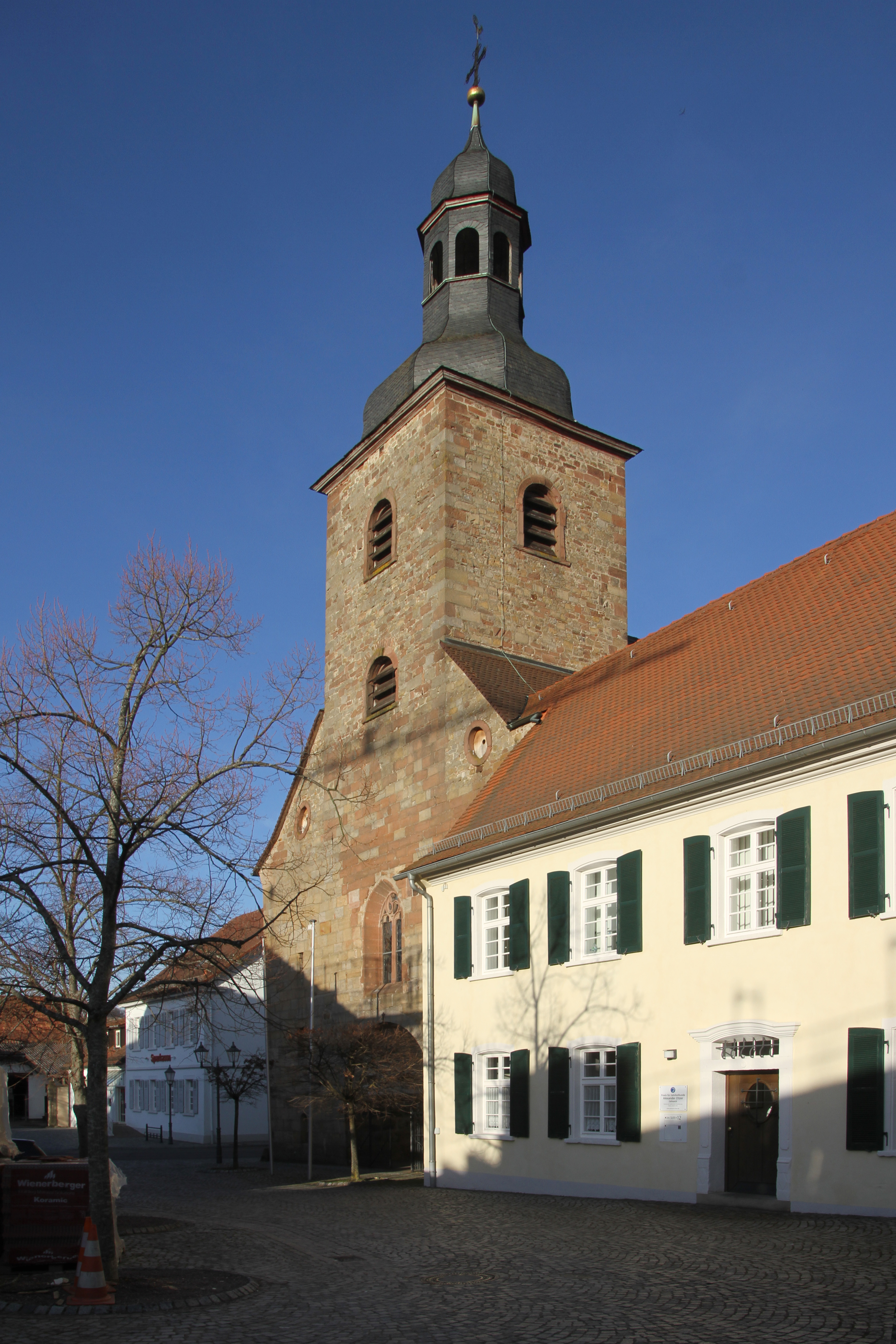
Saint Michael's church

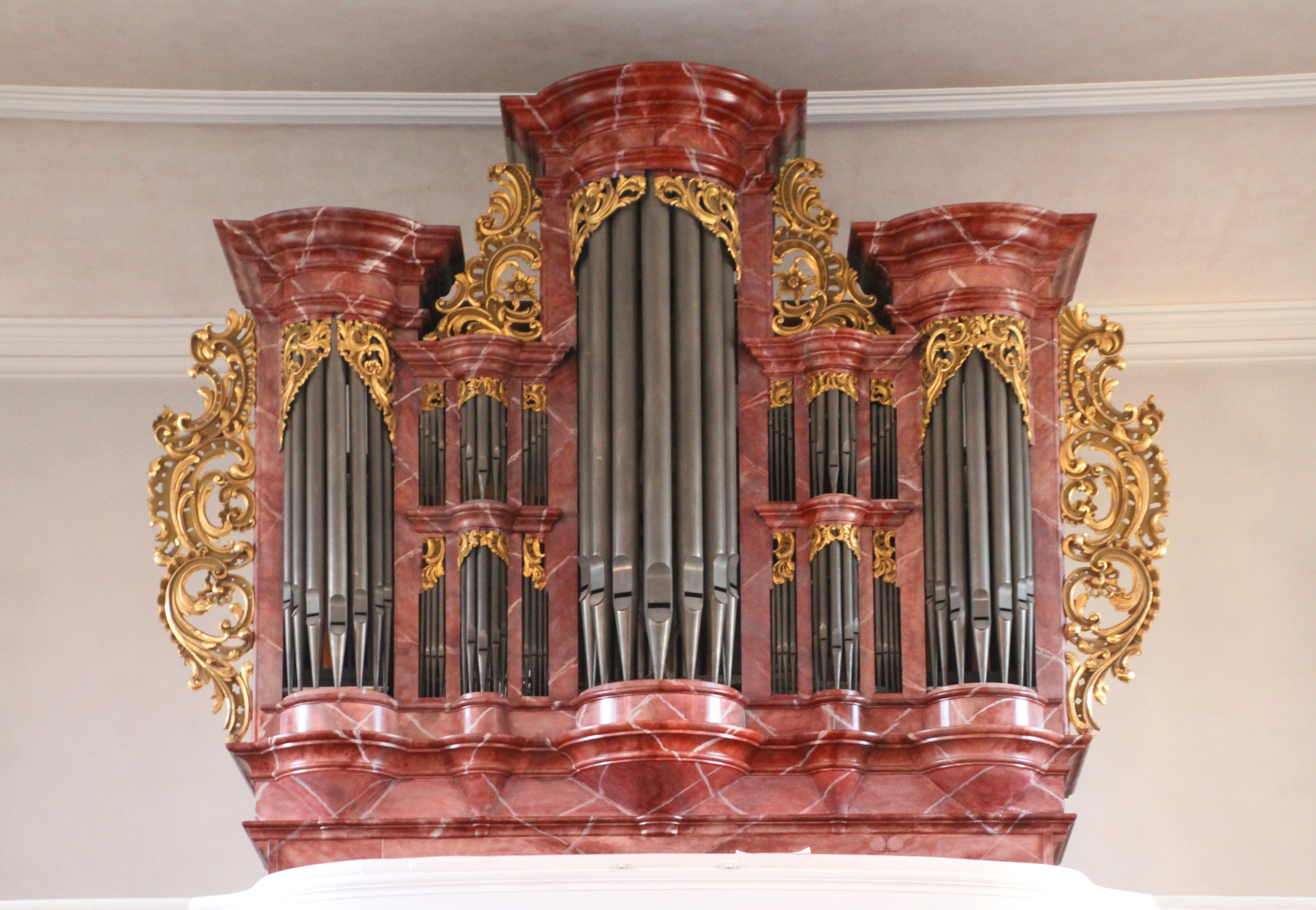
Organ in Saint Michael's church

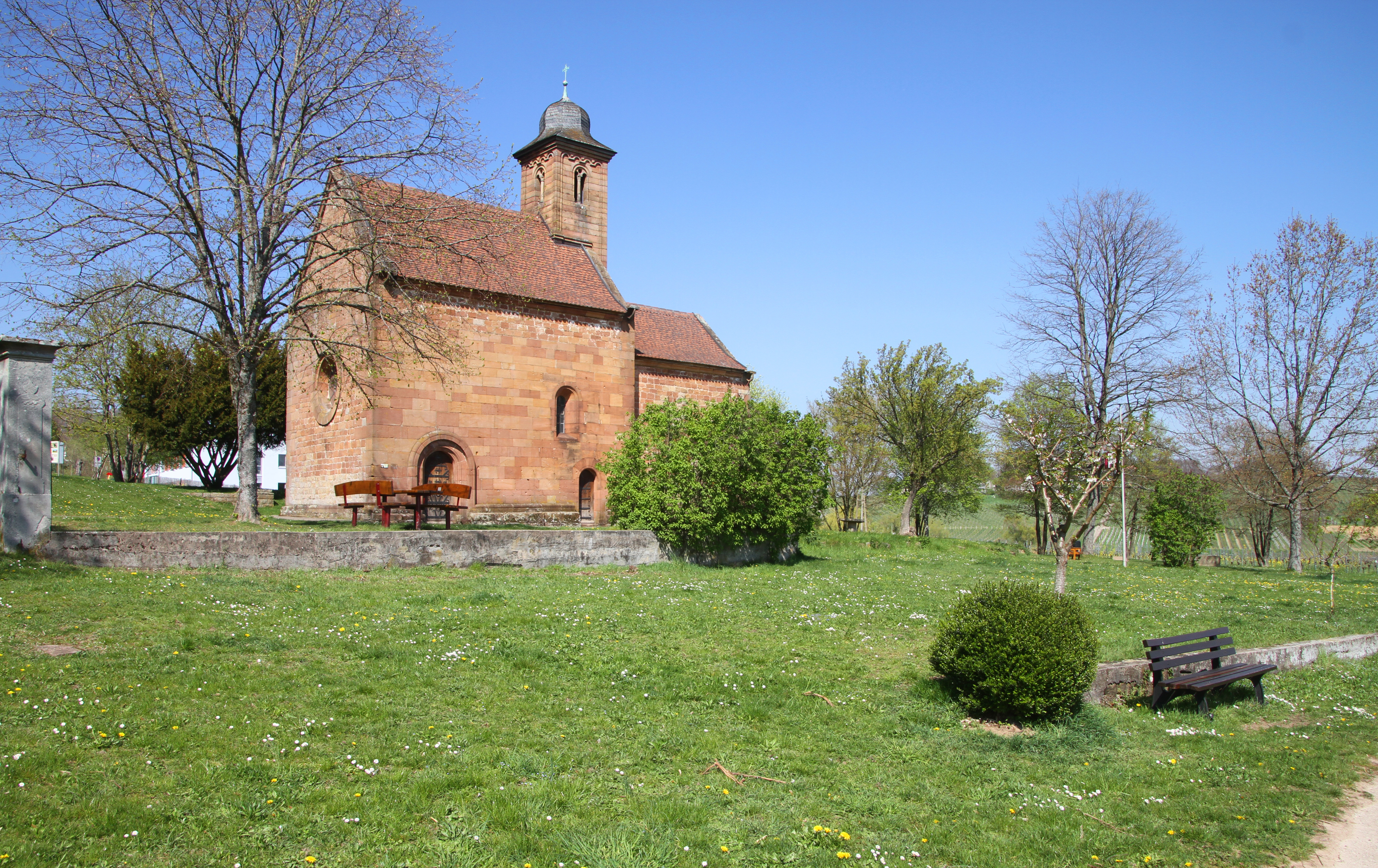
Nicholas Chapel

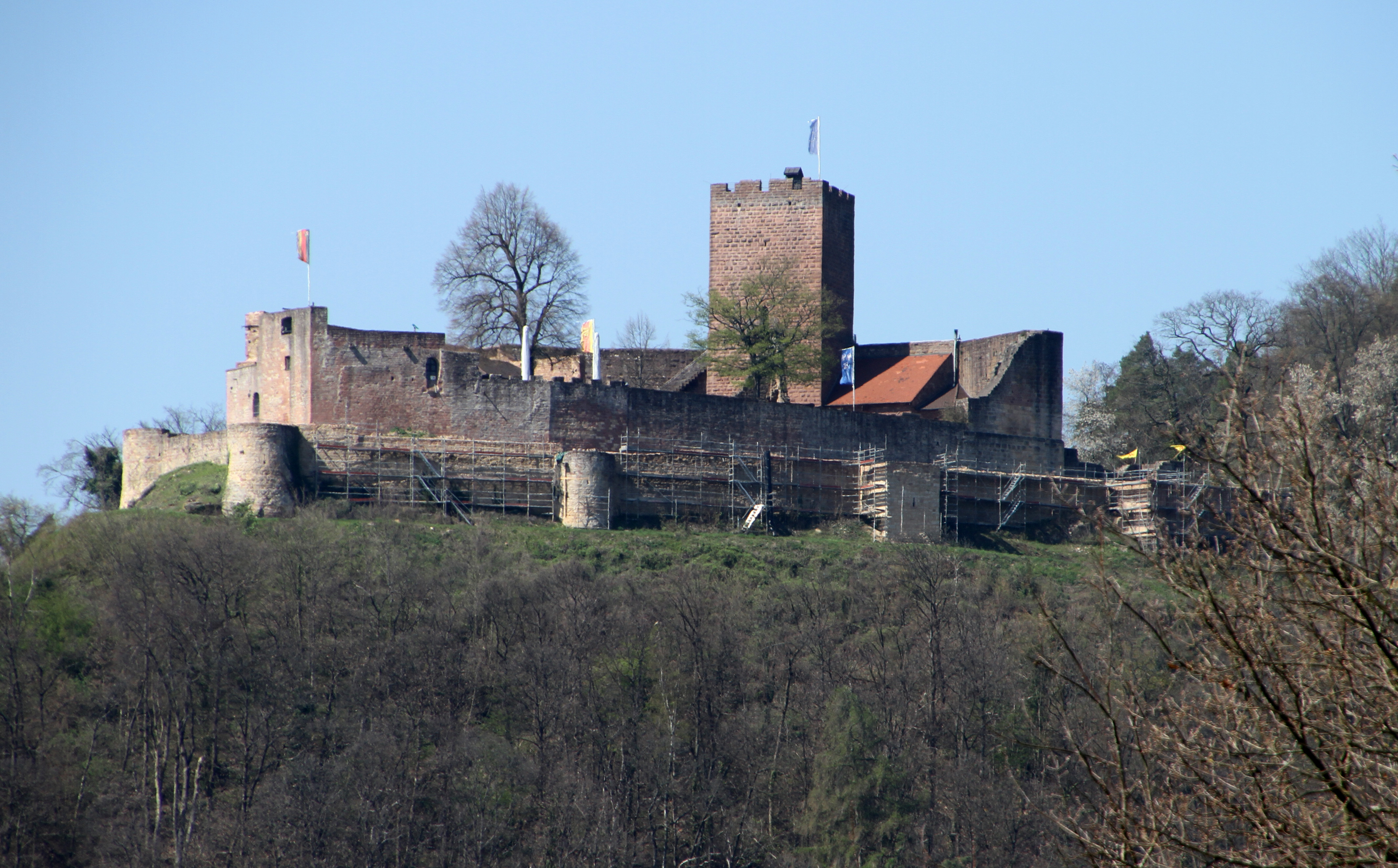
View of Landeck Castle
