= Barbelroth =

- Municipality
- Coat of arms

- Location of Barbelroth within Südliche Weinstraße district
- Interactive map of Barbelroth
- Location within Germany Location within Rhineland-Palatinate
- Coordinates: 49°06′13″N 08°04′27″E
- Country: Germany
- State: Rhineland-Palatinate
- District: Südliche Weinstraße
- Municipal assoc.: Bad Bergzabern

Government
  - Mayor (2024–current): Kurt Löwenmuth

Area
  - Total: 4.05 km^{2} (1.56 sq mi)
- Elevation: 148 m (486 ft)

Population (2025-12-31)
  - Total: 658
  - Density: 162/km^{2} (421/sq mi)
- Time zone: UTC+01:00 (CET)
  - Summer (DST): UTC+02:00 (CEST)
- Postal codes: 76889
- Dialling codes: 06343
- Vehicle registration: SÜW
- Website: www.barbelroth.de

Barbelroth is a municipality in the Südliche Weinstraße district, in Rhineland-Palatinate, Germany.
