= Kapsweyer =

- Municipality
- Coat of arms

- Location of Kapsweyer within Südliche Weinstraße district
- Interactive map of Kapsweyer
- Location within Germany Location within Rhineland-Palatinate
- Coordinates: 49°02′47″N 8°01′19″E
- Country: Germany
- State: Rhineland-Palatinate
- District: Südliche Weinstraße
- Municipal assoc.: Bad Bergzabern

Government
  - Mayor (2019–24): Felix Schönung (FW)

Area
  - Total: 8.27 km^{2} (3.19 sq mi)
- Elevation: 145 m (476 ft)

Population (2025-12-31)
  - Total: 881
  - Density: 107/km^{2} (276/sq mi)
- Time zone: UTC+01:00 (CET)
  - Summer (DST): UTC+02:00 (CEST)
- Postal codes: 76889
- Dialling codes: 06340
- Vehicle registration: SÜW
- Website: www.kapsweyer.de

Kapsweyer is a municipality in Südliche Weinstraße district, in Rhineland-Palatinate, western Germany.
