= Queich Valley Cycleway =

Queich Valley Cycleway (Queichtalradweg)
- Length: 50 km (31 mi)
- Location: Annweiler, Albersweiler, Landau in der Pfalz, Offenbach an der Queich, Bellheim, Germersheim
- Trailheads: Hauenstein; 49.1684°N 7.8471°E; Germersheim; 49.2277°N 8.3832°E
- Elevation gain/loss: 274 m of ascent, 447 m of descent
- Difficulty: easy with no climbs
- Surface: predominantly tarmac/ a few forest trails
- Website: Queichtalradweg at suedpfalz-tourismus.de

The Queich Valley Cycleway (German: Queichtalradweg) is a cycle path in Germany that runs from Hauenstein to Germersheim. It begins in Hauenstein at the source of the River Queich in the Palatine Forest and passes, inter alia, through Rinnthal, Landau in der Pfalz and Offenbach an der Queich, until it ends in Germersheim.
