= Wilgartaburg =

Ruined rock castle site in Rhineland-Palatinate, Germany

- Wiligartaburg, Wilgartsburg, Wiligartisburg
- Wilgartswiesen
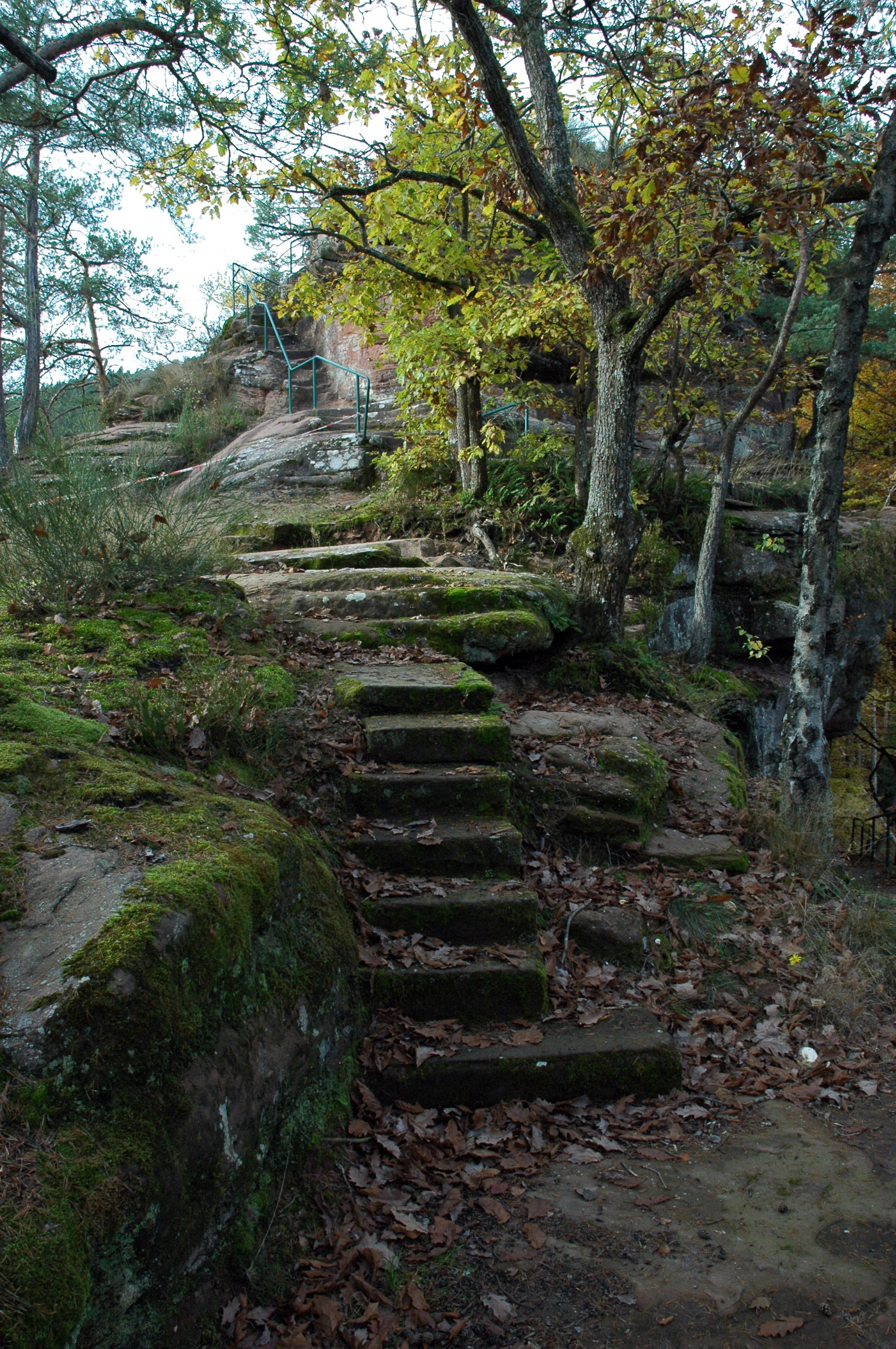
- South plateau of the castle

Site information
- Type: hill castle
- Code: DE-RP
- Condition: wall remains

Location
- Coordinates: 49°13′30″N 7°54′01″E
- Height: 245 m above sea level (NN)

Site history
- Built: around 800 to 1000

The Wilgartaburg, also called the Wiligartaburg, Wilgartsburg or Wiligartisburg, is the heritage site of a ruined rock castle located at a height of 245 m above sea level (NN) near the German village of Wilgartswiesen in the state of Rhineland-Palatinate.

== Location ==
The remains of the former hill castle are located near Wilgartswiesen before the Rinnthal at around 245 metres above sea level on a spur of the Göckelberg hill above the River Queich. This left tributary of the Rhine rises in the Wasgau region which comprises the southern part of the Palatinate Forest in Germany and the northern part of the Vosges in France.

== History ==
The Wilgartaburg is one of the oldest castles in the Palatinate region, probably dating to the 8th or 9th century. According to an unverified source it was built in the late 10th or early 11th century by an abbot of Hornbach Abbey, initially as a wooden castle. In the Salian era (11th century) it was rebuilt in stone. This was expanded in the 12th century and a final remodelling took place in the 13th century. The castle was probably abandoned at the end of the 13th century in favour of the better situated Falkenburg Castle.

According to legend, after the death of her husband, Gaugrave Wernher I, his widow, Wiligarta, led a hermit's life here as penance to atone for his dissolute life. On 16 April 828, her granddaughter, also called Wiligarta and the daughter of Wernher II, donated her estate, Wiligartawisa, with all the fields, pastureland and woods within which the castle stood, to Hornbach Abbey.

== Layout ==
All that survives of the castle are a few wall remains, numerous putlog holes and rock chambers.

== Literature ==
- Helmut Bernhard, Dieter Barz: Frühe Burgen in der Pfalz. Ausgewählte Beispiele salischer Wehranlagen. In: Horst Wolfgang Böhme: Burgen der Salierzeit in Hessen, in Rheinland-Pfalz und im Saarland. In: ders. (ed.): Burgen der Salierzeit, Teil 2: In den südlichen Landschaften des Reiches. Römisch-Germanische Zentralmuseum Monographien 26. Verlag Thorbecke. Sigmaringen, 1991. pp. 125–175
- Marco Bollheimer (2011), Felsenburgen im Burgenparadies Wasgau–Nordvogesen (in German) (3. ed.), Karlsruhe: Selbstverlag, pp. 46 f, ISBN 978-3-9814506-0-6
- Arndt Hartung: Pfälzer Burgenrevier. p. 78, Ludwigshafen, 1985
- Walter Ehescheid: Pfälzisches Burgen-Lexikon IV.2 St-Z. pp. 334–240, Kaiserslautern, 2007
- Walter Eitelmann: Rittersteine im Pfälzerwald. p. 50, Neustadt, 1998
- Friedrich-Wilhelm Krahe: Burgen des Deutschen Mittelalters. p. 670, Augsburg, 1996
