= Queich =

River in Germany

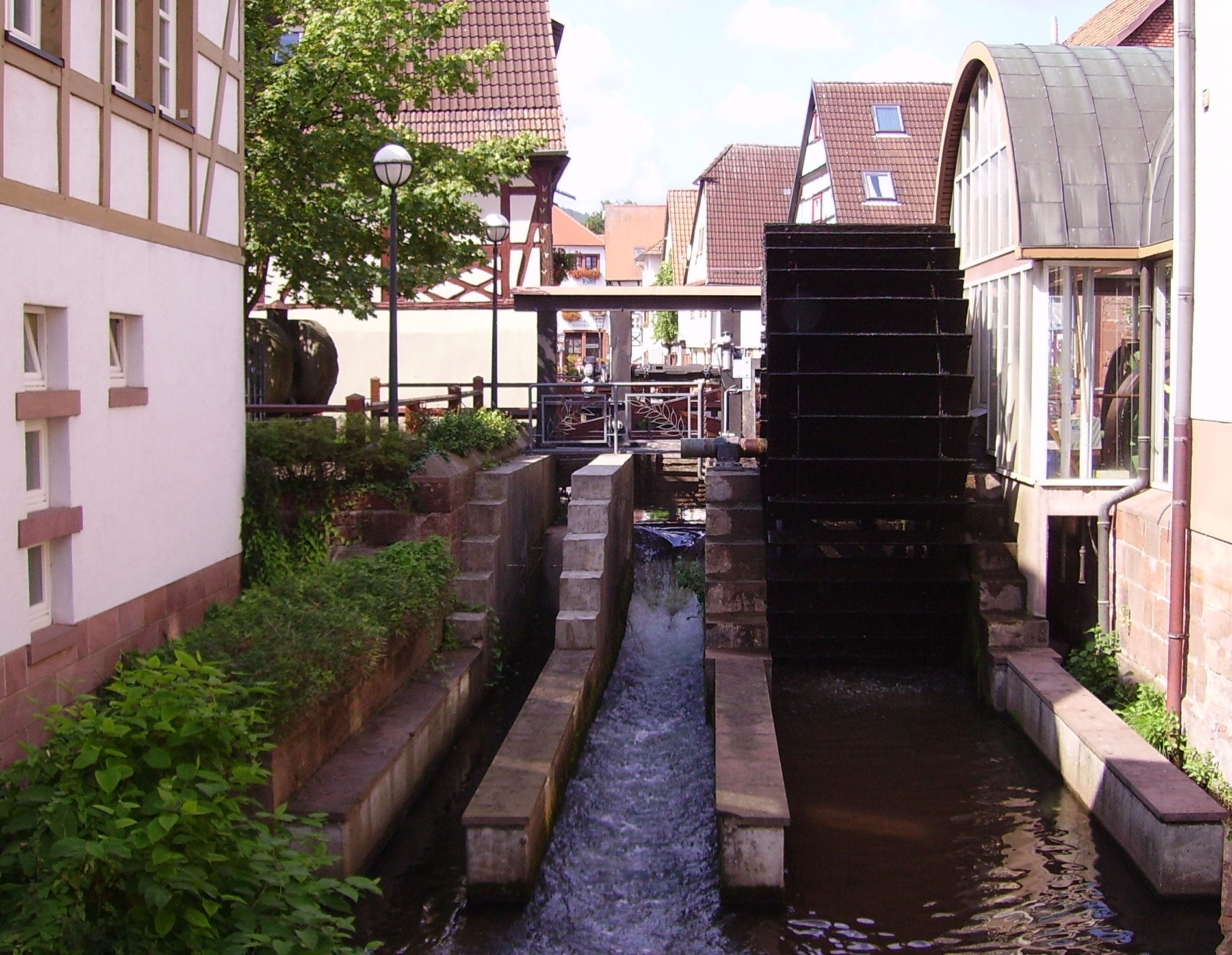
- Queich in Annweiler

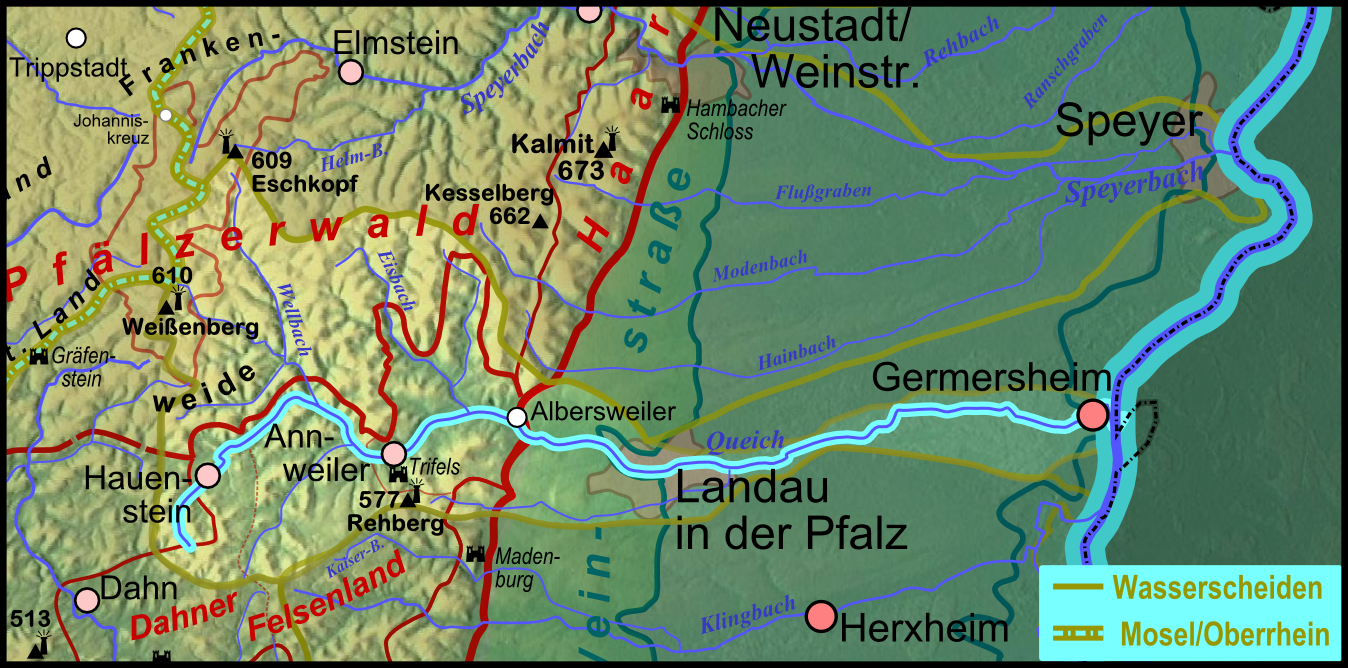
- Course of the Queich through Palatinate Forest and Upper Rhine valley

Location
- Country: Germany
- State: Rhineland-Palatinate
- Cities: Hauenstein; Annweiler am Trifels; Siebeldingen; Landau; Offenbach an der Queich

Physical characteristics
- Source: Palatinate Forest
  - location: Hauenstein, Rhineland-Palatinate, Germany
  - coordinates: 49°10′6″N 7°50′48″E
  - elevation: 395 m (1,296 ft)
- Mouth: Confluence with Rhine
  - location: Germersheim, Rhineland-Palatinate, Germany
  - coordinates: 49°13′39″N 8°23′4″E
  - elevation: 105 m (344 ft)
- Length: 51.5 km (32.0 mi)
- Basin size: 271.2 km^{2} (104.7 sq mi)

Basin features
- Progression: Rhine→ North Sea
- Tributaries
  - left: Birnbach, Spiegelbach
  - right: Wellbach, Eisbach, Fuchsbach

The Queich (German pronunciation: [kvaɪç]) is a river of Rhineland-Palatinate, Germany, a tributary of the Rhine. It rises in the southern part of the Palatinate Forest, and flows through the Upper Rhine valley to its confluence with the Rhine in Germersheim. It is 52 kilometres (32 mi) long and is one of the four major drainage systems of the Palatinate Forest along with the Speyerbach, Lauter and Schwarzbach. The Queich flows through the towns Hauenstein, Annweiler am Trifels, Siebeldingen, Landau, Offenbach an der Queich and Germersheim.

== Topography ==
=== Sources ===
The Queichquelle is 3 kilometres (1.9 mi) south of the municipality of Hauenstein at an elevation of almost 400 metres (1,300 ft) on the eastern slope of the 463-metre (1,519 ft) high mount Winterberg. It is taken surrounded with hewn stones from the typical local red sandstone. There are also benches and a foot baths.

=== Course and tributaries ===
The Queich first flows as a small stream north through Stephanstal valley to Hauenstein. There, it turns east and moves in large arcs through the Queich valley. It flows past Wilgartswiesen and Rinnthal, where it meets its largest tributary, the Wellbach. It then flows past Annweiler am Trifels, where it meets its second largest tributary, the Eisbach, which begins at the confluence of Eußerbach and Dernbach.

After about 20 kilometres (12 mi) the Queich valley opens up in Albersweiler towards the Rhine valley. Here the hilly landscape of the Palatinate Wine Route begins. The Queich crosses under the German Wine Road in Siebeldingen. It reaches the city of Landau in a suburb named Godramstein. Here it reaches the open plains of the Upper Rhine valley, after about 30 kilometres (19 mi), and takes up the Birnbach from the right.

At the Ottersheim weir some of the water is diverted into the right distributary Spiegelbach, which flows south-east via Bellheim to Sondernheim. The main branch of the Queich flows north-east and reaches the Rhine in the northern part of the city of Germersheim.

== History ==
=== Mills, drift wood and paper industries ===
The hydropower of the Queich has been used to drive mills for a very long time. From the 13th century onwards, the Queich was also used for timber rafting. Timber rafting peaked in the middle of the 19th century. However, timber rafting required an adequate water flow; splash dams were constructed to ensure this. However, while a splash dam is operational, the mills below it lack the water the need to run. When the timber rafting had completed, the splash dams would be torn down. Water was then abundant, but this often resulted in flooding the mill canals, and sometimes the mill canals were damaged by stuck logs. In 1881 finally managed to make the timber rafting stop altogether. Since 1881, the water is only used to drive the mills, except for one paper mill in Sarnstall, who use the water for their manufacturing process, and release the polluted water back into the river.

=== Albersweiler Canal and fortress of Landau ===
The city of Landau was expanded to a fortress by Marshal Vauban in 1688–91, during the War of the Palatine Succession. As part of this project, the Albersweiler Canal was dug, a 12-kilometre (7.5 mi) long navigable canal, connecting Landau to the quarry at Albersweiler. The canal ran parallel to the Queich and was fed with water from the Queich. The canal was abandoned in 1874. However, many traces of this oldest artificial waterway in Germany remain, for example the locks, with which the river water was diverted into the canal.

=== Queich Line ===
During the War of the Austrian Succession in the 1740s, the French forces constructed the Queich Line, a line of fortifications between Landau and Hördt on the left bank of the Rhine. Even today, some earthworks can be found in the Hördt Forest along the Spiegelbach.

=== Shift of the lower reaches ===
Recent research results suggest that the lower reaches of the Queich near Zeiskam were shifted to the north by about 2 kilometres (1.2 mi) at some time in the past, perhaps already in the Middle Ages. The reason may have been that timber rafters needed to shift the confluence with the Rhine into the town of Germersheim.

== Transport ==
The Queich Valley Railway, the regional connection between Pirmasens and Landau, runs since 1875 along the Queich between Hauenstein and Landau. The nearest railway stations are Offenbach an der Queich and Ottersheim, where the Queich only flows through the northern end of the municipality, without touching the settlements further south.

The federal road B10 also runs along the Queich between Hauenstein and Landau. Below Landau, the Queich flows through wide meadows and Bellheim Forest. This area is at best accessible using secondary roads.

For bicycles, the well-developed road network of the Queich Valley Cycleway had been created. It follows the entire course of Queich from the source to its mouth.

== See also ==
- Offenbach an der Queich
- List of rivers of Rhineland-Palatinate
