= Bornheim =

Bornheim may refer to several places in Germany:

- Bornheim (Rheinland), a town in North Rhine-Westphalia.
- Bornheim (Rheinhessen), a municipality in Rhineland-Palatinate (Alzey-Worms).
- Bornheim (Pfalz), a municipality in Rhineland-Palatinate (Südliche Weinstraße).
- Bornheim (Frankfurt am Main), a city district of Frankfurt am Main.
