= Schwanheim =

Schwanheim may refer to the following places in Germany:

- Schwanheim, Rhineland-Palatinate, in the Südwestpfalz district, Rhineland-Palatinate
- Schwanheim (Frankfurt am Main), a district of Frankfurt
- A part of Bensheim, in the Bergstraße district, Hesse
- A part of Schönbrunn (Baden), in the Rhein-Neckar district, Baden-Württemberg
