= German Shoe Museum =

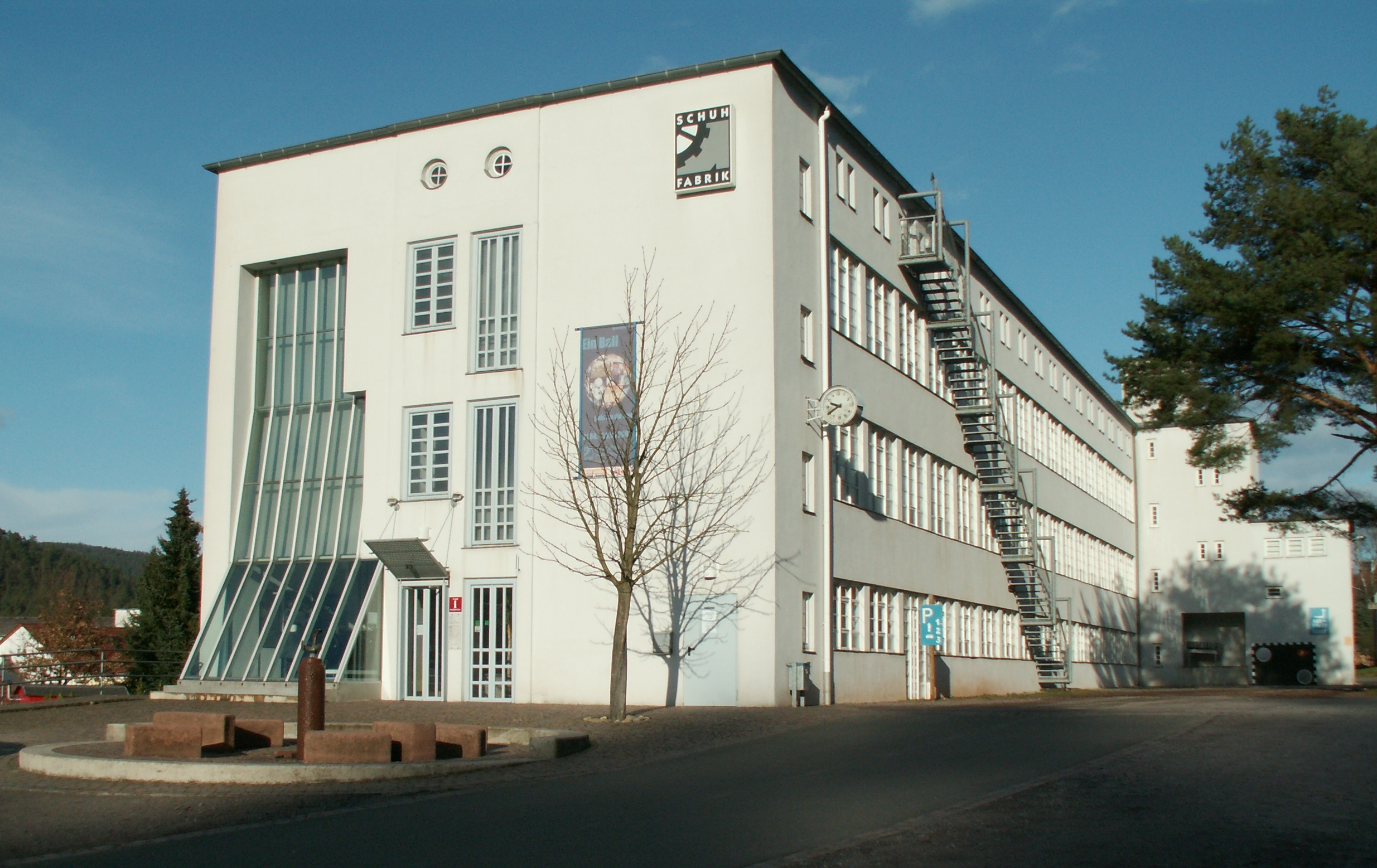

- Location within Germany
- Established: 1800
- Location: Hauenstein, Palatinate
- Coordinates: 49°11′23″N 7°51′21″E
- Website: www.deutsches-schuhmuseum.de

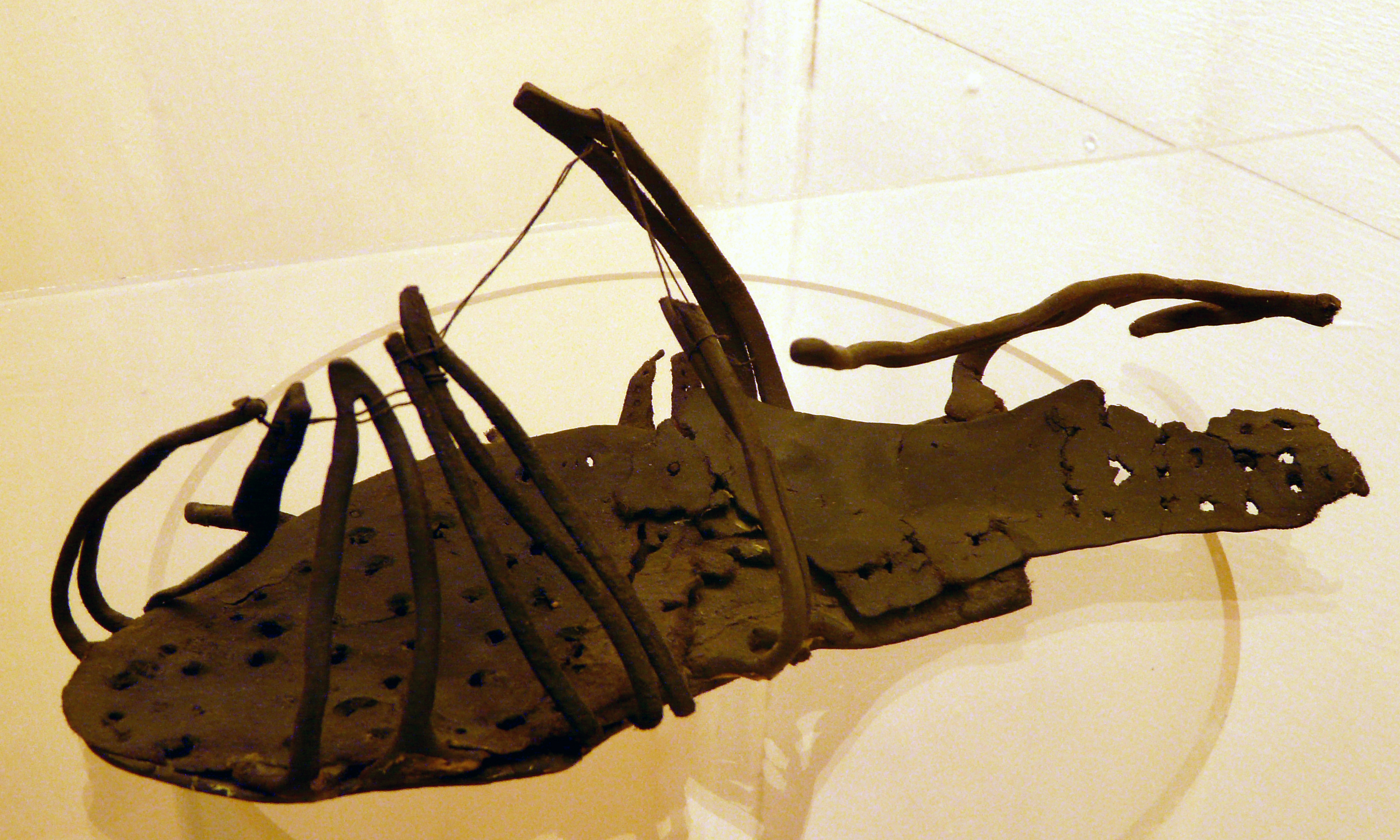
Roman sandals from around 200 B.C.

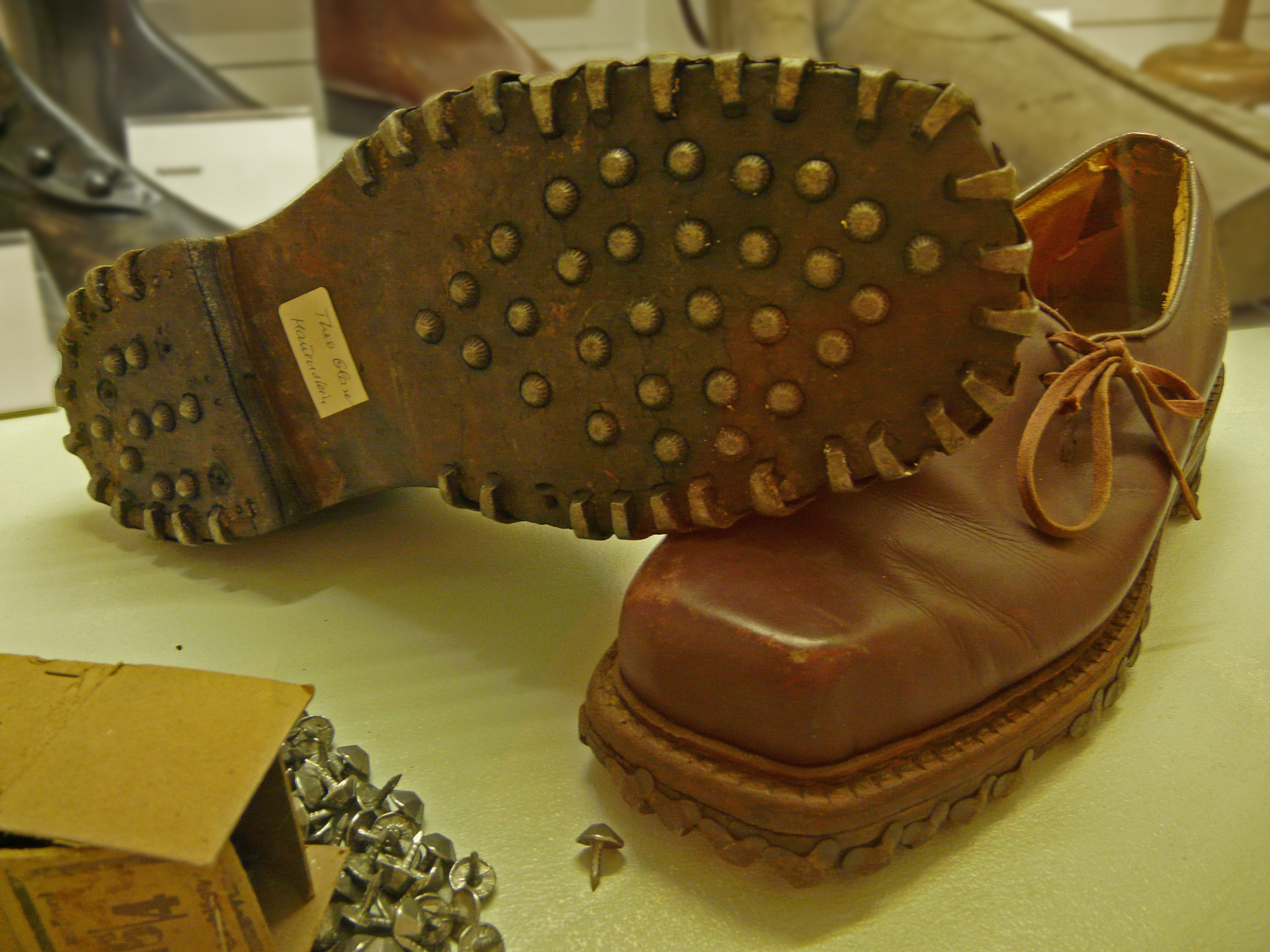
Traditional Bavarian Haferlschuhe with side laces, and soles fitted with staples and nails

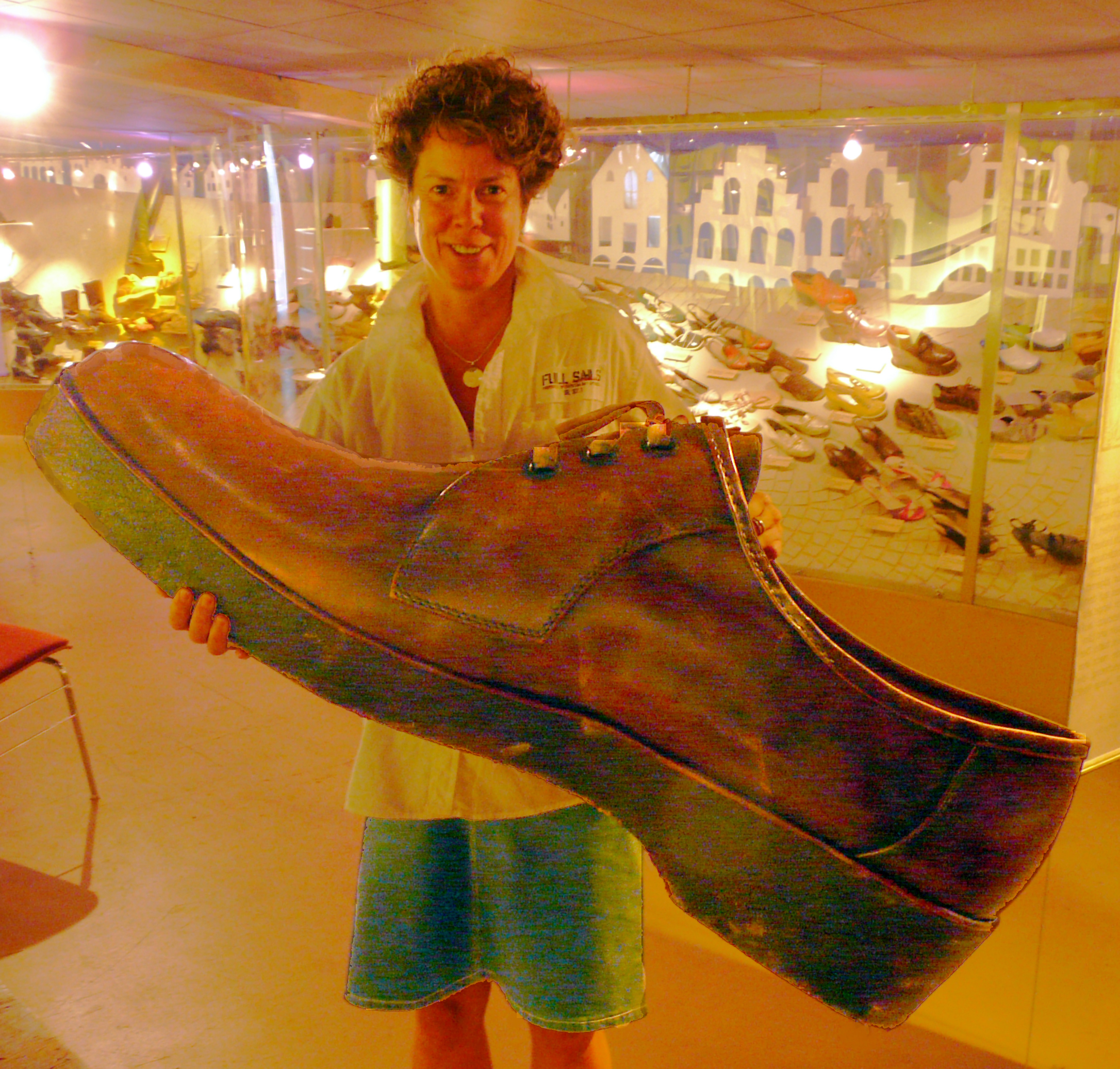
Size 180 shoe

The German Shoe Museum (German: Deutsches Schuhmuseum Hauenstein, full name: Museum für Schuhproduktion und Industriegeschichte Hauenstein) is a museum in Hauenstein, Palatinate. Its exhibits cover the development of the local shoe industry. On four stories of an old shoe factory, the museum illustrates both technical aspects of shoe manufacturing and the social and every day history of shoes.

The exhibition portrays the beginnings of the shoe industry in the nearby town of Pirmasens dating to around 1800, when discharged soldiers made shoes to earn a living. By the mid-19th century Pirmasens had developed into the most important site of the German shoe industry. This affected the little village of Hauenstein, which at the time consisted mainly of small farmers and forest workers.

In 1886 the Seibel brothers founded the first shoe factory in Hauenstein. By 1914, twenty factories had been established, with more than 1,000 employees. Despite the pressures to combine that arose from the French occupation, economic crises, and the war years, the number of factories had grown by 1960 to 35. Thereafter, however, progressive automation and the relocation of production to foreign countries led to a serious structural crisis in the German shoe industry, resulting in numerous businesses being closed.

The German Shoe Museum is housed in one of these former production facilities.

== Circular walk ==
A circular walk runs through the museum. The ground floor covers the early days of shoe manufacturing from 1740 to 1918, from steam engines to typical accommodations for the workers in a shoe factory. The top floor houses a collection of over 3,000 pairs of historic shoes owned by a shoe collector from Viersen, Ernst Tillmann.

The presentation of period and social history on the second floor covers the years 1918 to 1945. Here there is a still fully working "modern" shoe factory, which is in operation daily.

On the lower floor, the years from 1945 until now are covered. Here the museum shows the impact of the Second World War on the shoe industry and types of shoes made. The visitor is led through a typical 1960s flat and they can see, in a completely equipped shoe salon, how the fit of new shoes was tested with a fluoroscope using X-rays.

Also on the first floor is the largest pair of shoes in the world: a size 248. At the conclusion of the circular walk, the shoes of several prominent people, such as Angela Merkel and Joschka Fischer are displayed.

== Award ==
The German Shoe Museum in Hauenstein was awarded an "excellent" grade in the European Museum competition because, in the view of the assessment panel, it brings together well the presentation of shoe culture and social history.
