= Spiegelbach =

River in Germany

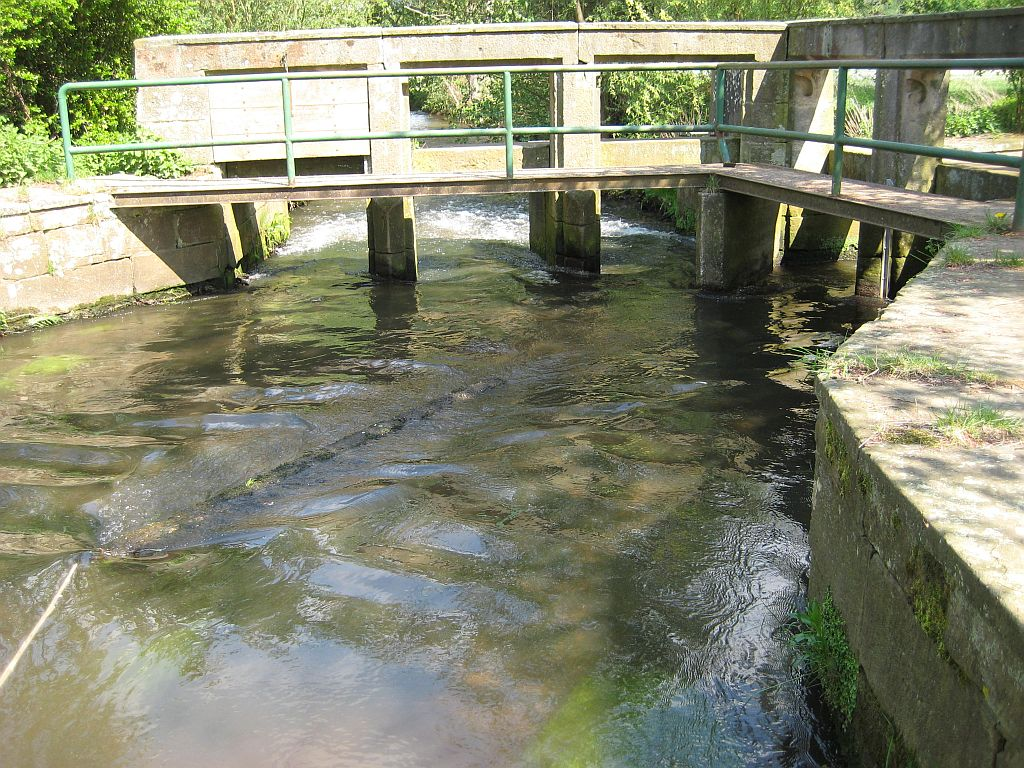
- Spiegelbach splits away from Queich north of Ottersheim

Location
- Country: Germany
- State: Rhineland-Palatinate

Physical characteristics
- Source
  - location: Weir splitting Spiegelbach off of Queich, north of Ottersheim
  - coordinates: 49°12′33.26″N 8°14′13.19″E
  - elevation: 122 m (400 ft)
- Mouth
  - location: Confluence with Rhine, southwest of Sondernheim,
  - coordinates: 49°11′6.25″N 8°20′43.76″E
  - elevation: 100 m (330 ft)
- Length: 9.2 km (5.7 mi)
- Basin size: 54.592 km^{2} (21.078 sq mi)

Basin features
- Progression: Rhine→ North Sea

The Spiegelbach is a river in the southern Palatinate, Germany. It arises as a diversion of the Queich, which rises in the Palatinate Forest, and thus has no separate source. It flows into the Rhine at Sondernheim.

After a devastating flood in 1745, in which the mills on the Altbach and Brühlgraben were flooded, it was decided to create a diversion from the Queich towards Bellheim, in order to provide the newly built mills with a steady supply of water. From the weir on the boundary of the districts Ottersheim and Knittelsheim, the Spiegelbach flows 9.2 kilometres (5.7 mi) before reaching the Old Rhine at Sondernheim.

== See also ==
- List of rivers of Rhineland-Palatinate
