= Hauenstein (Verbandsgemeinde) =

Verbandsgemeinde in Rhineland-Palatinate

- Verbandsgemeinde
- Location of Hauenstein within Südwestpfalz district
- Interactive map of Hauenstein
- Location within Germany Location within Rhineland-Palatinate
- Coordinates: 49°11′N 7°52′E
- Country: Germany
- State: Rhineland-Palatinate
- District: Südwestpfalz
- Seat: Hauenstein
- Subdivisions: 8 municipalities

Area
  - Total: 109.89 km^{2} (42.43 sq mi)

Population (2025-12-31)
  - Total: 8,062
  - Density: 73.36/km^{2} (190.0/sq mi)
- Time zone: UTC+01:00 (CET)
  - Summer (DST): UTC+02:00 (CEST)
- Website: www.hauenstein-pfalz.de

Hauenstein is a Verbandsgemeinde ("collective municipality") in the Südwestpfalz district, in Rhineland-Palatinate, Germany. The seat of the municipality is in Hauenstein.

The Verbandsgemeinde Hauenstein consists of the following Ortsgemeinden ("local municipalities"):

1. Darstein
2. Dimbach
3. Hauenstein
4. Hinterweidenthal
5. Lug
6. Schwanheim
7. Spirkelbach
8. Wilgartswiesen
