= Falkenburg Castle (Palatinate) =

Castle in Rhineland-Palatinate, Germany

Falkenburg
- Falkenberg, Falckenberg, Valchenberch
- Wilgartswiesen
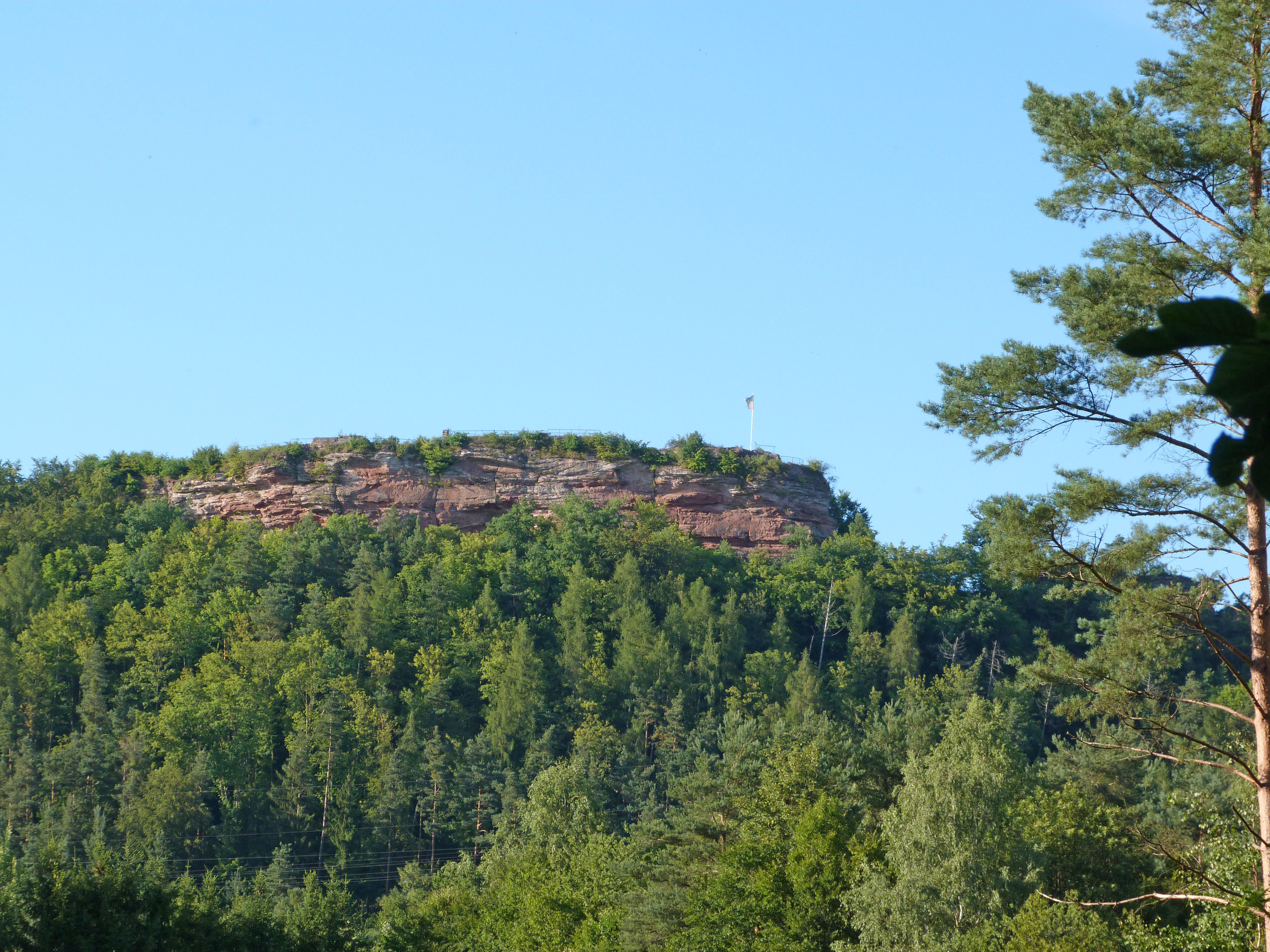
- The Falkenburg from the southwest

Site information
- Type: hill castle, rock castle
- Code: DE-RP
- Condition: bergfried remains, wall foundations

Location
- Coordinates: 49°12′19″N 7°51′36″E
- Height: 0 m above sea level (NN)

Site history
- Built: around 1246

Garrison information
- Occupants: ministeriales

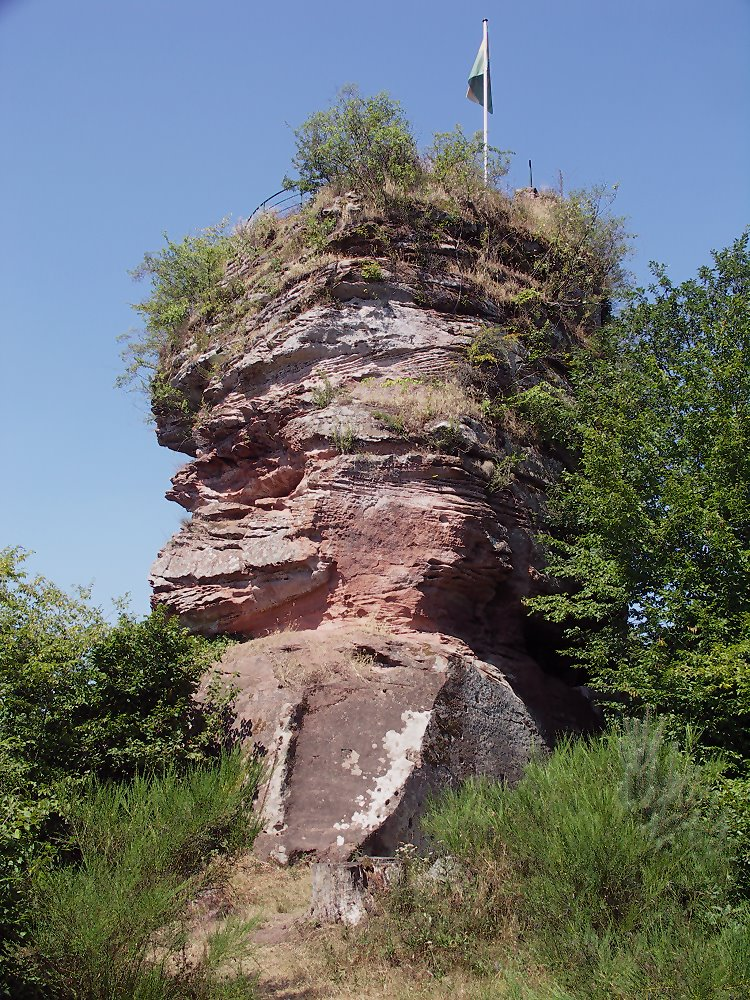
Remains of Falkenburg Castle

Falkenburg Castle is a castle ruin overlooking the village of Wilgartswiesen in the Palatinate Forest in Rhineland-Palatinate, Germany. Like almost all castles in this region it was built on sandstone.

== History ==
The Falkenburg was probably built in the 11th century as a successor to the nearby Wilgartaburg and to protect the adjacent villages.

In the documents of Archbishop Erkinbald of Mainz, letters dating to 1019 describe a rock outcrop called the Falkenstein considered as the most northerly border belonging to the principality of Kaiserslautern. Werner I of Bolanden is thought to have begun construction of the castle on this rock in 1125; he was a vassal of Duke Frederick II of Swabia.

At the Bolanden family monastery in Hane were records of Sigbold of Falkenstein in 1135; he was one of the first to take the name of the castle for himself. Then in 1233 the imperial ministerialis, Phillip IV of Bolanden, was the first to clearly say that he was from Falkenstein in a legal document.

A Werner of Falkenburg is mentioned among legal documents dating from 1290. From 1300 to 1313 the castle was enfeoffed to Frederick IV of Leiningen. Then in 1317 it was given in fee to Counts Palatine Rudolph II and Rupert I by Louis IV, Holy Roman Emperor. In 1375, Emich V of Leiningen became the owner of the castle and in 1398 the fiefdom of Falkenstein became its own county.

From 1420, the Bolanded/Falkenstein lineage died out and the counts of Virneburg took over the castle until 1456 when it went into the possession of the counts of Dhaun-Oberstein. In 1458, the Duke of Lorraine took over and became the high feudal lord.

The Falkenburg survived the German Peasants' War of 1524–1525. In 1545, with the fall of the empire the House of Austria took over under the charge of the Austrian government in Freiburg.

During the 30 Years' War the castle was captured, first by Spanish troops in 1631, and then again by Swedish troops in 1632, before being finally retaken by troops from Lorraine. The castle was demolished by the French Marshal Schönbeck in 1638.

The entire region of Frankenweide was administered from Falkenburg until the castle was destroyed, when it was then moved to Wilgartswiesen.

Restoration work on the castle was carried out in the 1930s and 1970.

== Location ==
The elongated castle is in two parts: a 50-by-11-metre (164 by 36 ft) upper ward that was connected by a staircase to the lower ward with its gateway and drawbridge.

The bergfried occupied an area of 6.8 by 7.2 metres (22 by 24 ft). Its walls were 1.8 metres (5.9 ft) thick and its remains 2.5 metres (8.2 ft) high. The ruins include a cistern, a gatehouse, a rock chamber, living quarters (a palas) and further wall remnants on the castle rock.

== Literature ==
- Marco Bollheimer (2011), Felsenburgen im Burgenparadies Wasgau–Nordvogesen (in German) (3. ed.), Karlsruhe: Selbstverlag, pp. 48 f, ISBN 978-3-9814506-0-6
- Alexander Thon (ed.): „... wie eine gebannte, unnahbare Zauberburg“. Burgen in der Südpfalz, 2nd revised edition, Regensburg, 2005, pp. 44–47. ISBN 3795415705
- Rolf Übel (2002), "Falkenburg", in Jürgen Keddigkeit; Alexander Thon; Rolf Übel (eds.), Pfälzisches Burgenlexikon. Vol. 2. F−H (in German), vol. Bd. 12.2, Kaiserslautern, pp. 37–46, ISBN 3-927754-48-X, ISSN 0936-7640
