= Hochstadt, Rhineland-Palatinate =

Hochstadt
- Municipality
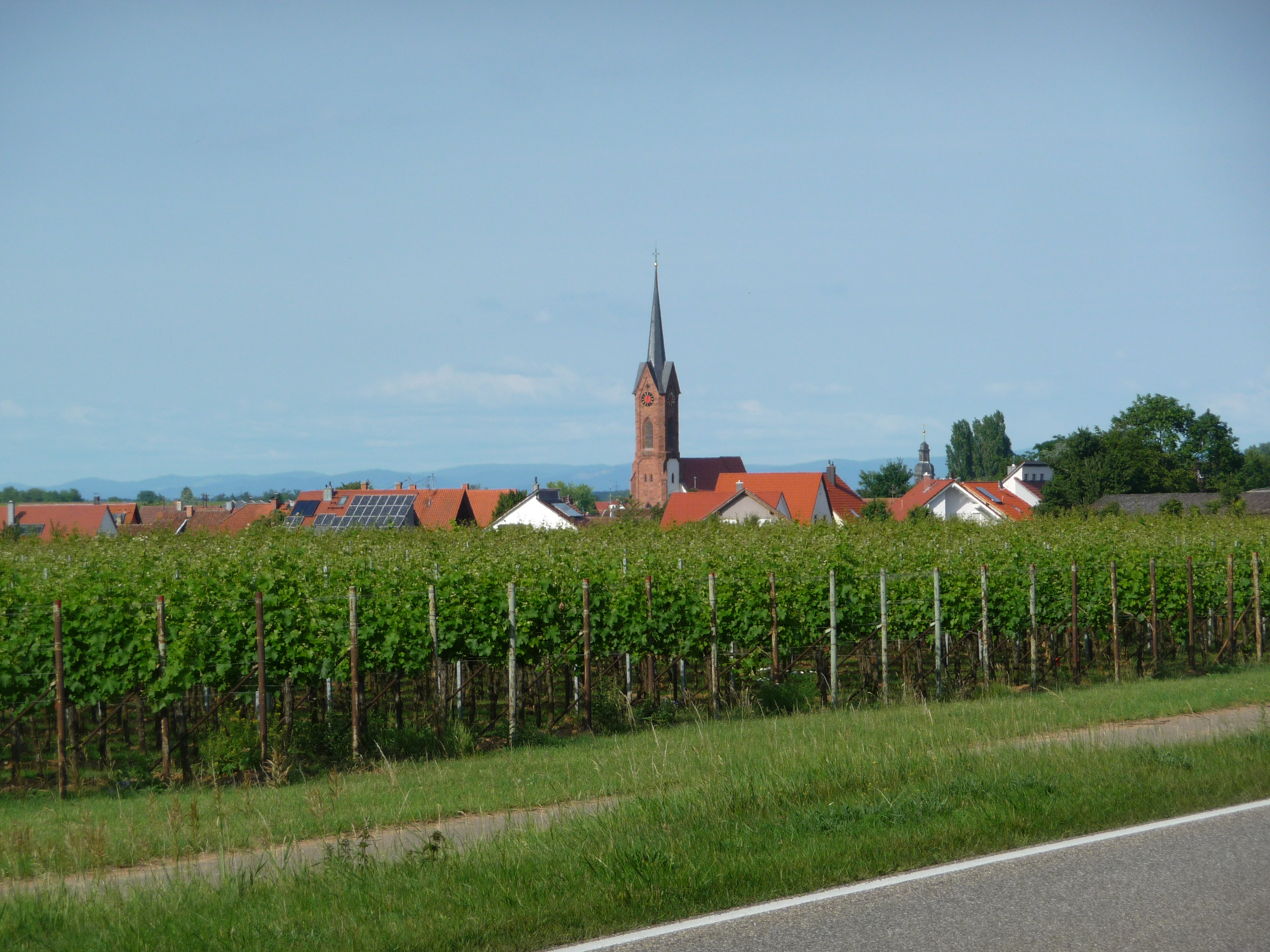

- Coat of arms

- Location of Hochstadt within Südliche Weinstraße district
- Interactive map of Hochstadt
- Location within Germany Location within Rhineland-Palatinate
- Coordinates: 49°14′25″N 8°12′57″E
- Country: Germany
- State: Rhineland-Palatinate
- District: Südliche Weinstraße
- Municipal assoc.: Offenbach an der Queich
- Subdivisions: 2

Government
  - Mayor (2019–24): Timo Reuther (CDU)

Area
  - Total: 15.45 km^{2} (5.97 sq mi)
- Elevation: 135 m (443 ft)

Population (2025-12-31)
  - Total: 2,721
  - Density: 176.1/km^{2} (456.1/sq mi)
- Time zone: UTC+01:00 (CET)
  - Summer (DST): UTC+02:00 (CEST)
- Postal codes: 76879
- Dialling codes: 06347
- Vehicle registration: SÜW
- Website: offenbach-queich.de

Hochstadt (German pronunciation: [ˈhoːxʃtat]) is a municipality in Südliche Weinstraße district, in Rhineland-Palatinate, western Germany, between Landau and Speyer.

It belongs, along with other municipalities, to the Verbandsgemeinde Offenbach an der Queich. The town has a long history, dating back several thousands of years. Hochstadt has just recently held its 1225 Year Celebration, from August 1–4 and August 8–11.

Johann Valentin Pressler, who was a forebear of Elvis Presley and a winegrower, emigrated from Niederhochstadt to America in 1710.
