= Dimbach, Germany =

Dimbach
- Municipality
- Coat of arms

- Location of Dimbach within Südwestpfalz district
- Interactive map of Dimbach
- Location within Germany Location within Rhineland-Palatinate
- Coordinates: 49°10′02″N 7°53′52″E
- Country: Germany
- State: Rhineland-Palatinate
- District: Südwestpfalz
- Municipal assoc.: Hauenstein

Government
  - Mayor (2019–24): Thomas Funck

Area
  - Total: 2.19 km^{2} (0.85 sq mi)
- Elevation: 250 m (820 ft)

Population (2025-12-31)
  - Total: 178
  - Density: 81.3/km^{2} (211/sq mi)
- Time zone: UTC+01:00 (CET)
  - Summer (DST): UTC+02:00 (CEST)
- Postal codes: 76848
- Dialling codes: 06392
- Vehicle registration: PS

Dimbach (German pronunciation: [ˈdɪmbax]) is a municipality in Südwestpfalz district, in Rhineland-Palatinate, western Germany.
