= Spirkelbach =

- Municipality
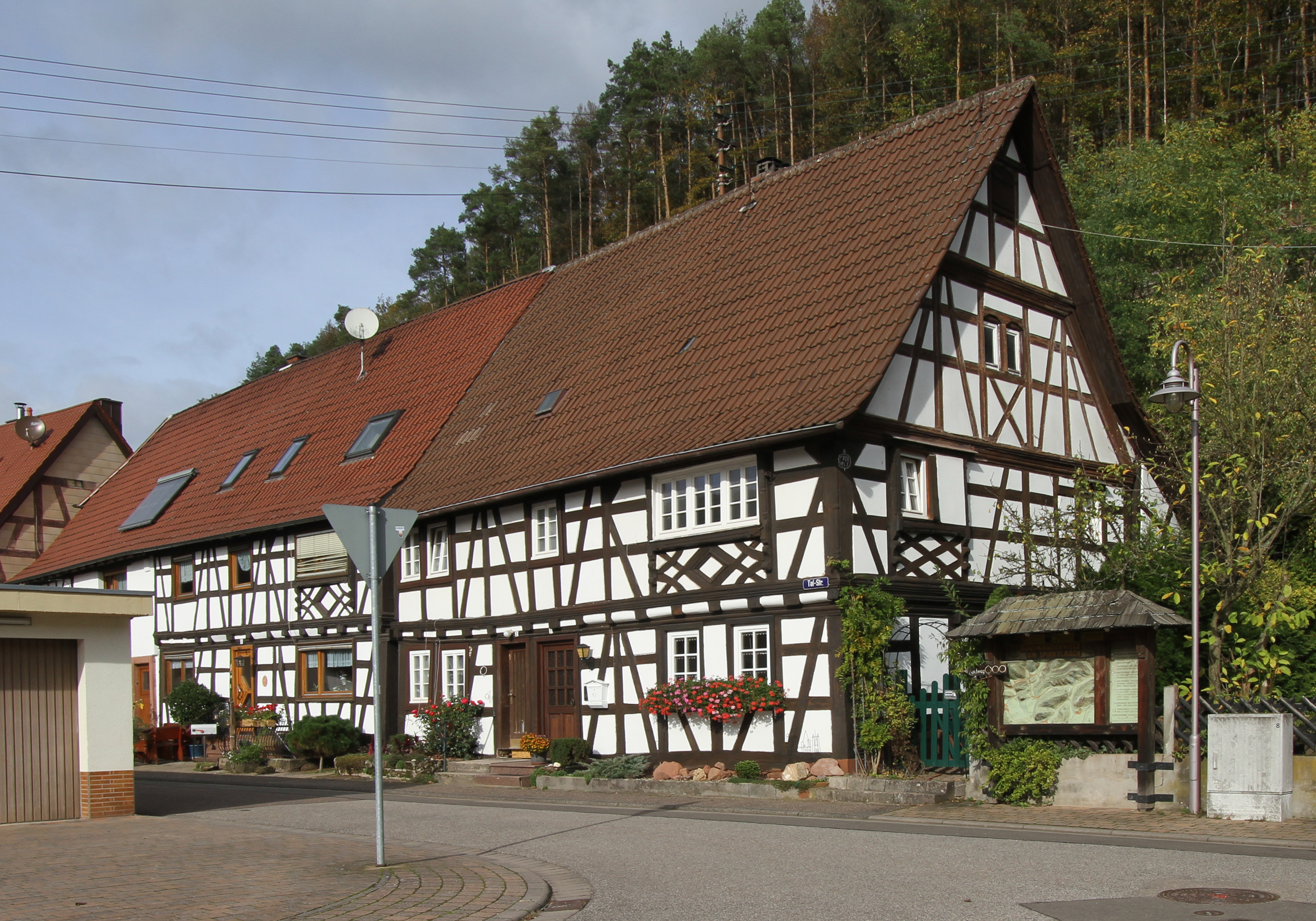

- Coat of arms

- Location of Spirkelbach within Südwestpfalz district
- Interactive map of Spirkelbach
- Location within Germany Location within Rhineland-Palatinate
- Coordinates: 49°11′50″N 7°53′10″E
- Country: Germany
- State: Rhineland-Palatinate
- District: Südwestpfalz
- Municipal assoc.: Hauenstein

Government
  - Mayor (2019–24): Edgar Perret (SPD)

Area
  - Total: 6.88 km^{2} (2.66 sq mi)
- Elevation: 230 m (750 ft)

Population (2025-12-31)
  - Total: 635
  - Density: 92.3/km^{2} (239/sq mi)
- Time zone: UTC+01:00 (CET)
  - Summer (DST): UTC+02:00 (CEST)
- Postal codes: 76848
- Dialling codes: 06392
- Vehicle registration: PS
- Website: spirkelbach.de

Spirkelbach (German pronunciation: [ˈʃpɪʁkl̩bax]) is a municipality in Südwestpfalz district, in Rhineland-Palatinate, western Germany.

== Politics ==
The council consists of twelve in Spirkelbach Council members who worked for the local elections on 7 June 2009 in a majority vote were chosen, and the honorary mayor as chairman.
