= Darstein =

- Municipality
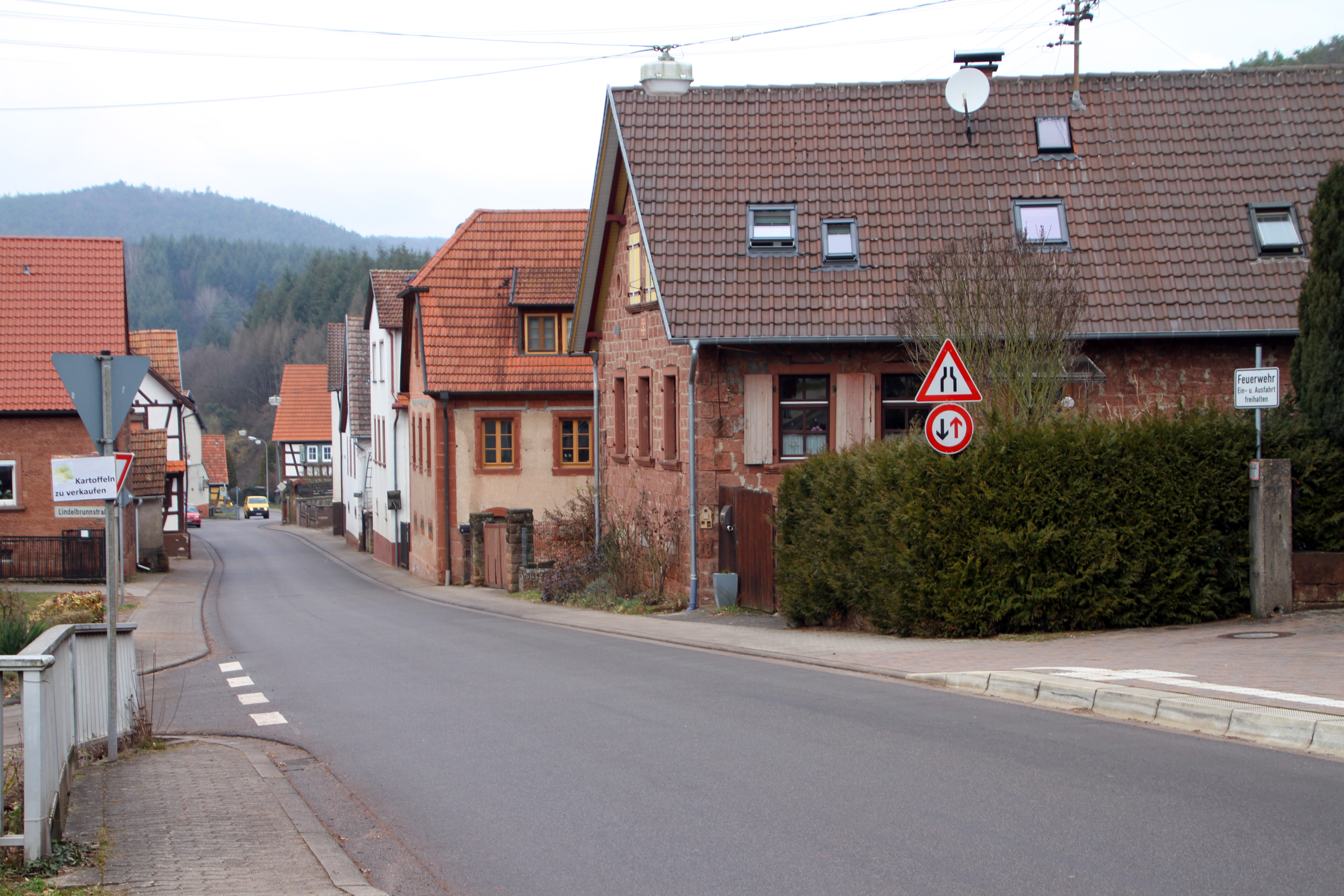

- Coat of arms

- Location of Darstein within Südwestpfalz district
- Interactive map of Darstein
- Location within Germany Location within Rhineland-Palatinate
- Coordinates: 49°9′25″N 7°53′1″E
- Country: Germany
- State: Rhineland-Palatinate
- District: Südwestpfalz
- Municipal assoc.: Hauenstein

Government
  - Mayor (2019–24): Armin Ladenberger

Area
  - Total: 2.39 km^{2} (0.92 sq mi)
- Elevation: 300 m (980 ft)

Population (2025-12-31)
  - Total: 176
  - Density: 73.6/km^{2} (191/sq mi)
- Time zone: UTC+01:00 (CET)
  - Summer (DST): UTC+02:00 (CEST)
- Postal codes: 76848
- Dialling codes: 06398
- Vehicle registration: PS
- Website: hauenstein-pfalz.de

Darstein is a municipality in Südwestpfalz district, in Rhineland-Palatinate, western Germany.
