= Lug, Germany =

Lug
- Municipality
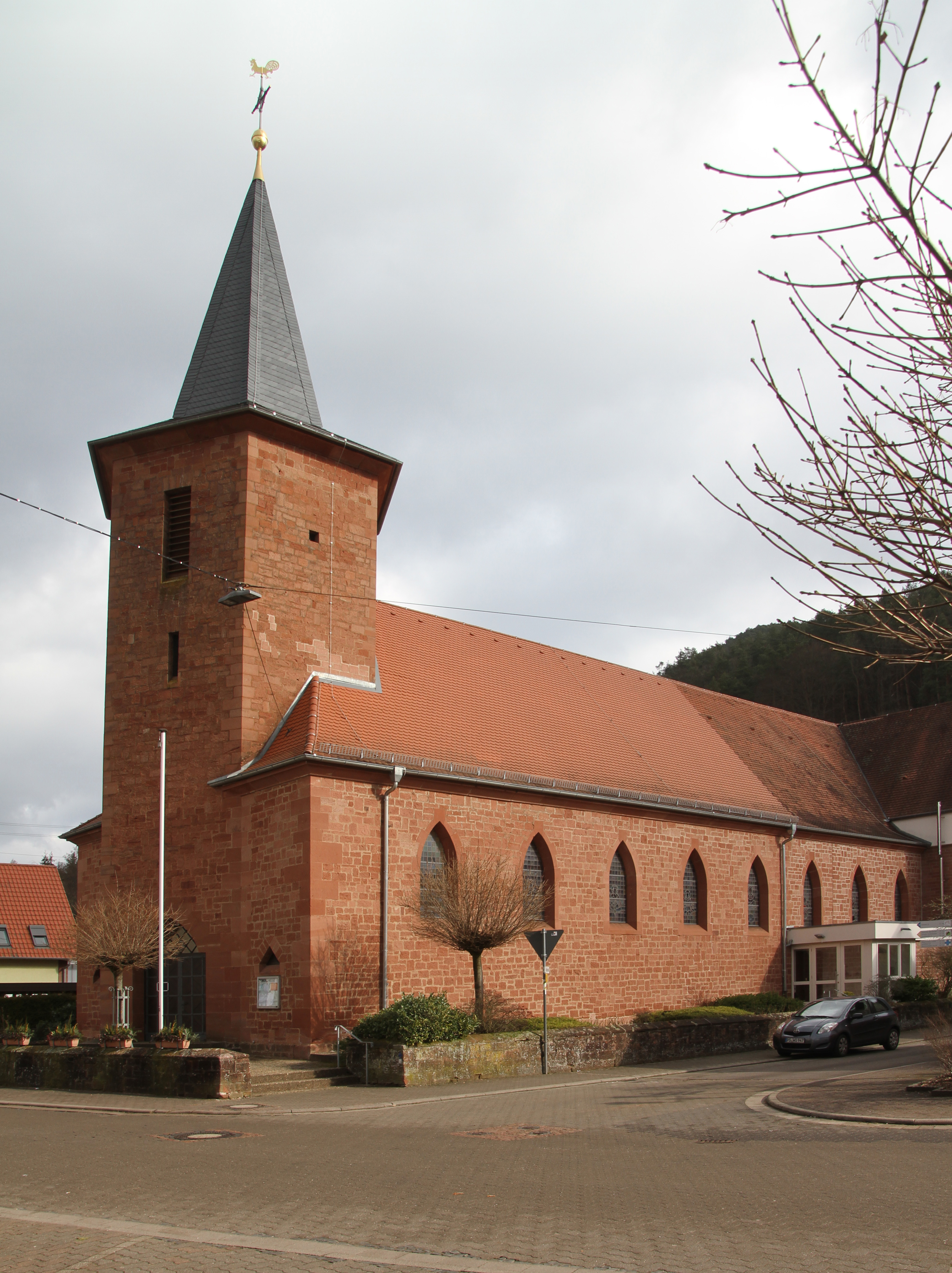
- Church of All Saints

- Coat of arms

- Location of Lug within Südwestpfalz district
- Interactive map of Lug
- Location within Germany Location within Rhineland-Palatinate
- Coordinates: 49°10′58″N 7°53′40″E
- Country: Germany
- State: Rhineland-Palatinate
- District: Südwestpfalz
- Municipal assoc.: Hauenstein

Government
  - Mayor (2019–24): Hermann Rippberger

Area
  - Total: 2.31 km^{2} (0.89 sq mi)
- Elevation: 210–250 m (690–820 ft)

Population (2025-12-31)
  - Total: 556
  - Density: 241/km^{2} (623/sq mi)
- Time zone: UTC+01:00 (CET)
  - Summer (DST): UTC+02:00 (CEST)
- Postal codes: 76848
- Dialling codes: 06392
- Vehicle registration: PS
- Website: www.lug-pfalz.de

Lug (German pronunciation: [luːk]) is a municipality in Südwestpfalz district, in Rhineland-Palatinate, western Germany.
