= Offenbach an der Queich (Verbandsgemeinde) =

- Verbandsgemeinde
- Location of Offenbach an der Queich within Südliche Weinstraße district
- Interactive map of Offenbach an der Queich
- Location within Germany Location within Rhineland-Palatinate
- Coordinates: 49°12′N 8°12′E
- Country: Germany
- State: Rhineland-Palatinate
- District: Südliche Weinstraße
- Seat: Offenbach an der Queich
- Subdivisions: 4 municipalities

Area
  - Total: 45.63 km^{2} (17.62 sq mi)

Population (2025-12-31)
  - Total: 12,765
  - Density: 279.8/km^{2} (724.5/sq mi)
- Time zone: UTC+01:00 (CET)
  - Summer (DST): UTC+02:00 (CEST)
- Website: www.offenbach-queich.de

Offenbach an der Queich is a Verbandsgemeinde ("collective municipality") in the Südliche Weinstraße district, in Rhineland-Palatinate, Germany. The seat of the municipality is in Offenbach an der Queich.

The Verbandsgemeinde Offenbach an der Queich consists of the following Ortsgemeinden ("local municipalities"):

1. Bornheim
2. Essingen
3. Hochstadt
4. Offenbach an der Queich
