= Wilgartswiesen =

- Municipality
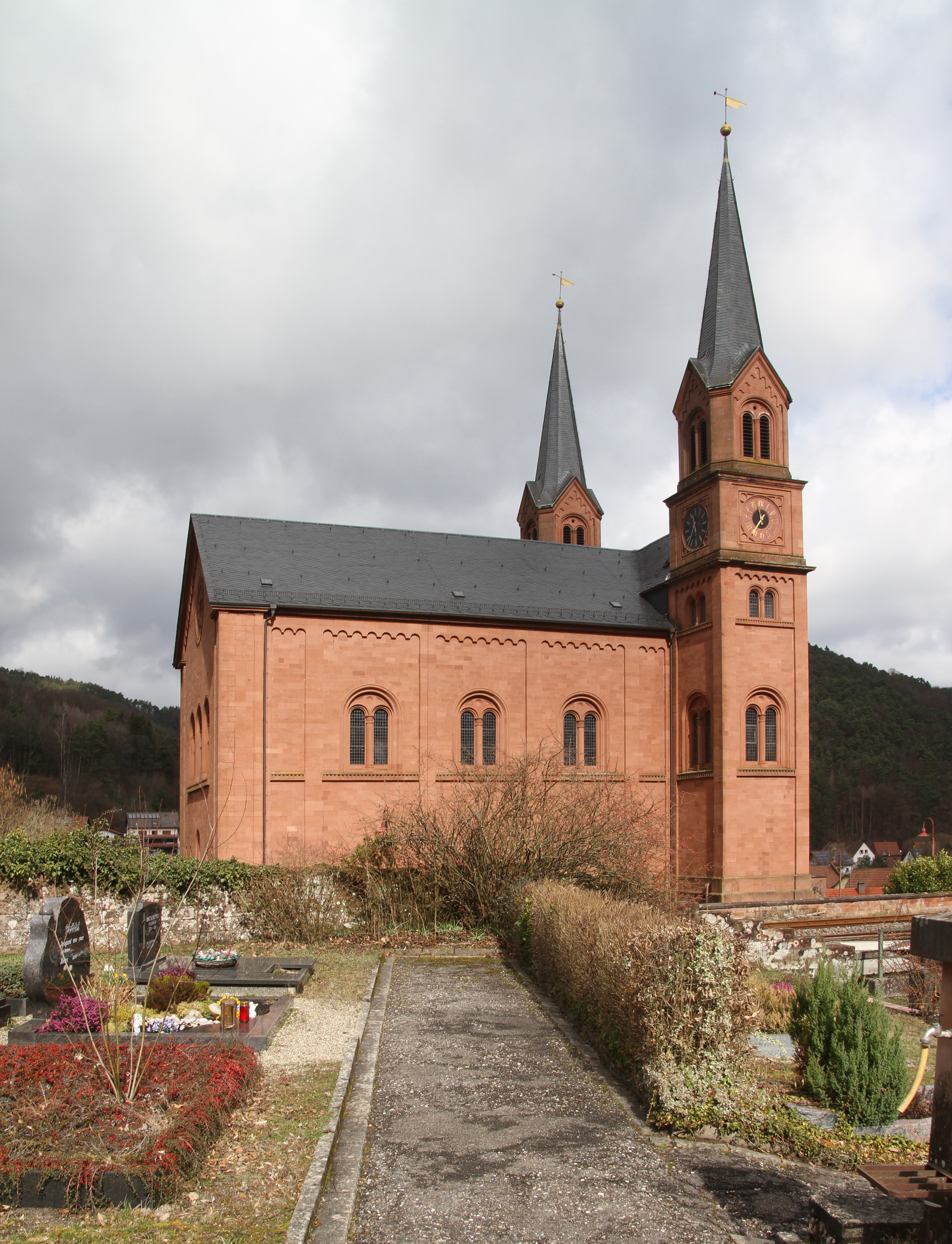

- Coat of arms

- Location of Wilgartswiesen within Südwestpfalz district
- Interactive map of Wilgartswiesen
- Location within Germany Location within Rhineland-Palatinate
- Coordinates: 49°13′N 7°53′E
- Country: Germany
- State: Rhineland-Palatinate
- District: Südwestpfalz
- Municipal assoc.: Hauenstein

Government
  - Mayor (2019–24): Manfred Schoch

Area
  - Total: 58.34 km^{2} (22.53 sq mi)
- Elevation: 220 m (720 ft)

Population (2025-12-31)
  - Total: 937
  - Density: 16.1/km^{2} (41.6/sq mi)
- Time zone: UTC+01:00 (CET)
  - Summer (DST): UTC+02:00 (CEST)
- Postal codes: 76848
- Dialling codes: 06392
- Vehicle registration: PS
- Website: www.wilgartswiesen.de

Wilgartswiesen is a municipality in Südwestpfalz district, in Rhineland-Palatinate, western Germany.

== Geography ==
The municipality lies in the southern part of the Palatine Forest, the German part of the Wasgau, in the middle of the Palatine Forest-North Vosges Biosphere Reserve. On the territory of Wilgartswieser the Wellbach stream empties into the Queich, which itself is one of the main drainage systems of the Palatinate region. North of the village run several bunter sandstone rock groups, out of which the castles of Wilgartaburg and Falkenburg have been hewn. The municipal terrain, most of which is part of the Frankenweide, is almost entirely wooded.
