= Essingen, Rhineland-Palatinate =

Essingen
- Municipality
- Coat of arms

- Location of Essingen within Südliche Weinstraße district
- Interactive map of Essingen
- Location within Germany Location within Rhineland-Palatinate
- Coordinates: 49°14′05″N 08°10′19″E
- Country: Germany
- State: Rhineland-Palatinate
- District: Südliche Weinstraße
- Municipal assoc.: Offenbach an der Queich

Government
  - Mayor (2019–24): Susanne Volz

Area
  - Total: 11.39 km^{2} (4.40 sq mi)
- Elevation: 151 m (495 ft)

Population (2025-12-31)
  - Total: 2,255
  - Density: 198.0/km^{2} (512.8/sq mi)
- Time zone: UTC+01:00 (CET)
  - Summer (DST): UTC+02:00 (CEST)
- Postal codes: 76879
- Dialling codes: 06347
- Vehicle registration: SÜW
- Website: www.essingen.eu

Essingen (German pronunciation: [ˈɛsɪŋən]) is a municipality in the Südliche Weinstraße district, in Rhineland-Palatinate, Germany.

== Notable people ==
- John George Nicolay (1832-1901) biographer, secretary to United States president Abraham Lincoln
