= Schwanheim, Rhineland-Palatinate =

Schwanheim
- Municipality
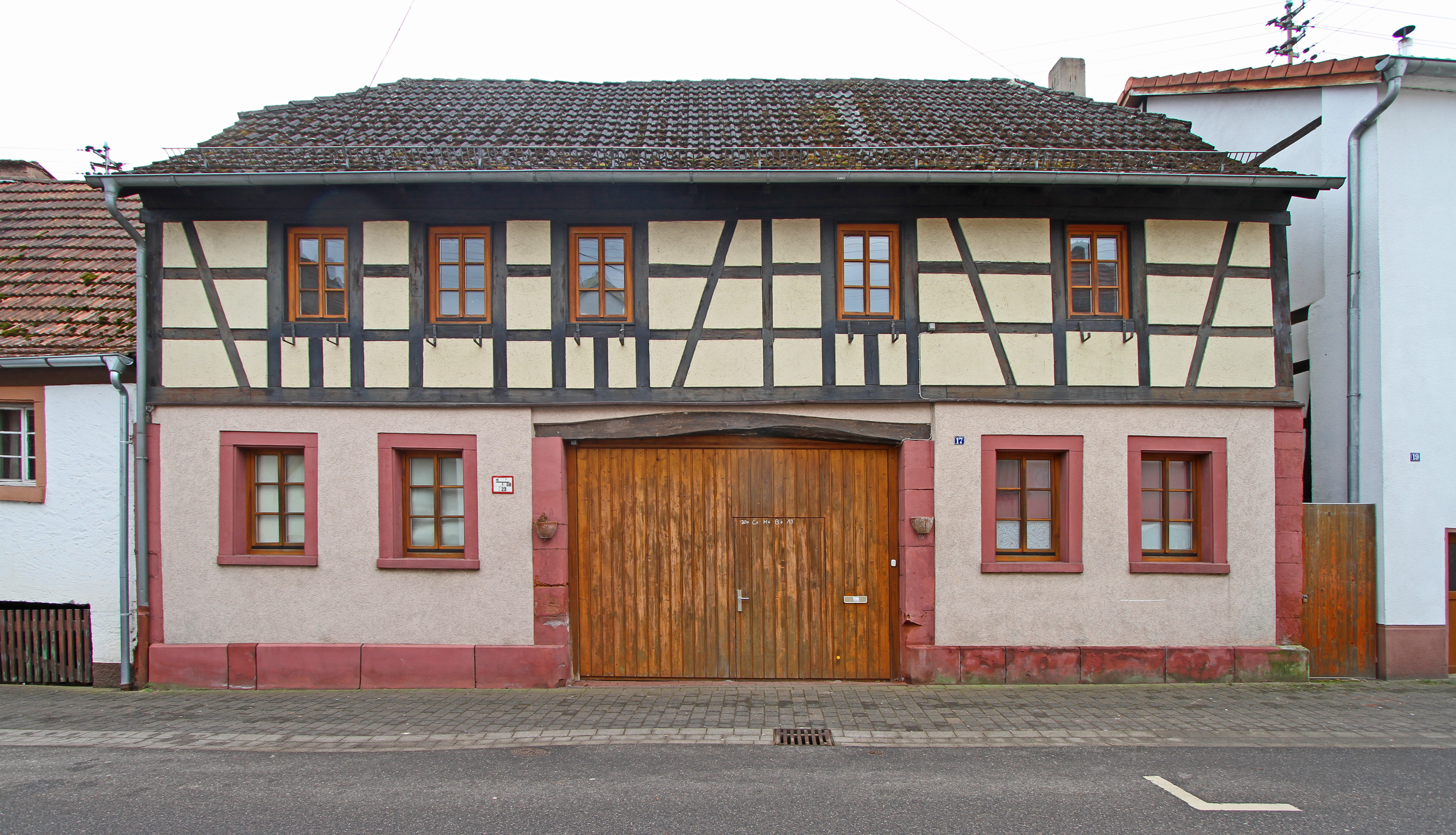

- Coat of arms

- Location of Schwanheim within Südwestpfalz district
- Interactive map of Schwanheim
- Location within Germany Location within Rhineland-Palatinate
- Coordinates: 49°10′1.74″N 7°52′47.88″E
- Country: Germany
- State: Rhineland-Palatinate
- District: Südwestpfalz
- Municipal assoc.: Hauenstein

Government
  - Mayor (2019–24): Herbert Schwarzmüller

Area
  - Total: 6.96 km^{2} (2.69 sq mi)
- Elevation: 237 m (778 ft)

Population (2025-12-31)
  - Total: 565
  - Density: 81.2/km^{2} (210/sq mi)
- Time zone: UTC+01:00 (CET)
  - Summer (DST): UTC+02:00 (CEST)
- Postal codes: 76848
- Dialling codes: 06392
- Vehicle registration: PS

Schwanheim (German pronunciation: [ˈʃvaːnhaɪm]) is a municipality in Südwestpfalz district, in Rhineland-Palatinate, western Germany.
