= Siebeldingen =

- Municipality
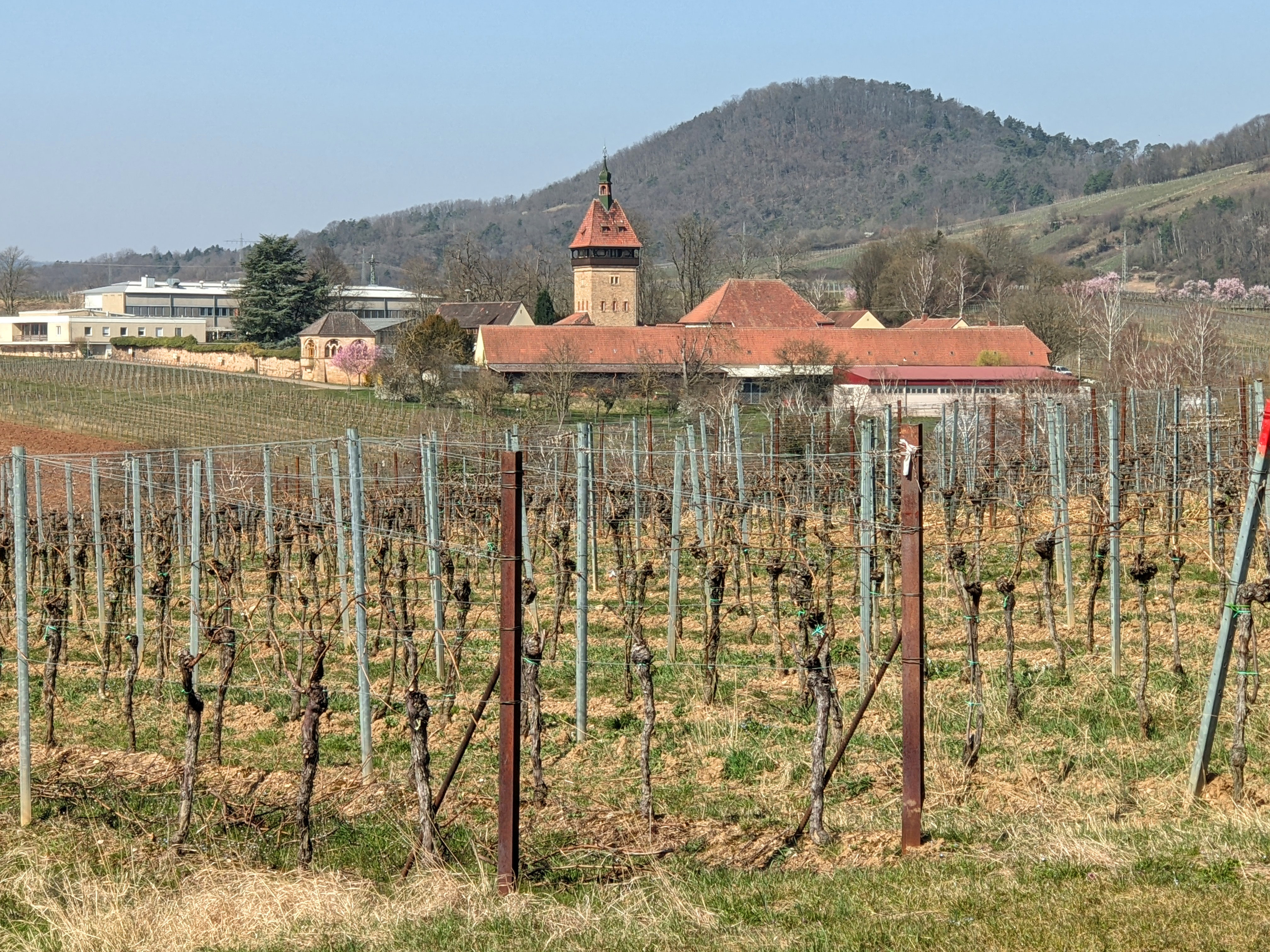

- Coat of arms

- Location of Siebeldingen within Südliche Weinstraße district
- Interactive map of Siebeldingen
- Location within Germany Location within Rhineland-Palatinate
- Coordinates: 49°12′41″N 8°03′05″E
- Country: Germany
- State: Rhineland-Palatinate
- District: Südliche Weinstraße
- Municipal assoc.: Landau-Land

Government
  - Mayor (2019–24): Peter Klein

Area
  - Total: 6.06 km^{2} (2.34 sq mi)
- Elevation: 163 m (535 ft)

Population (2025-12-31)
  - Total: 1,066
  - Density: 176/km^{2} (456/sq mi)
- Time zone: UTC+01:00 (CET)
  - Summer (DST): UTC+02:00 (CEST)
- Postal codes: 76833
- Dialling codes: 06345
- Vehicle registration: SÜW
- Website: www.siebeldingen.de

Siebeldingen (German pronunciation: [ˈziːbl̩dɪŋən]) is a municipality in Südliche Weinstraße district, in Rhineland-Palatinate, western Germany.

== Photo gallery ==
Siebeldingen

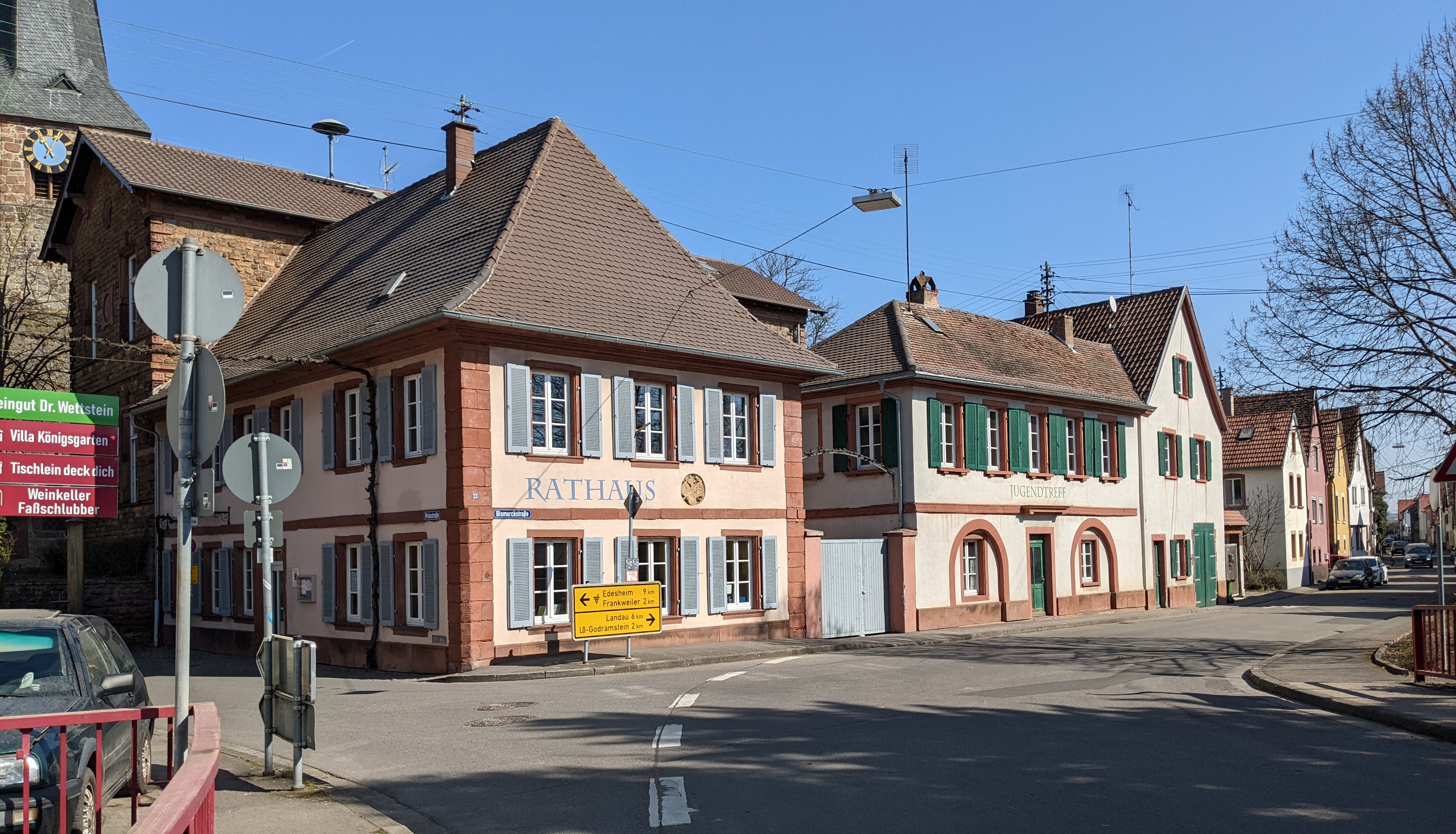

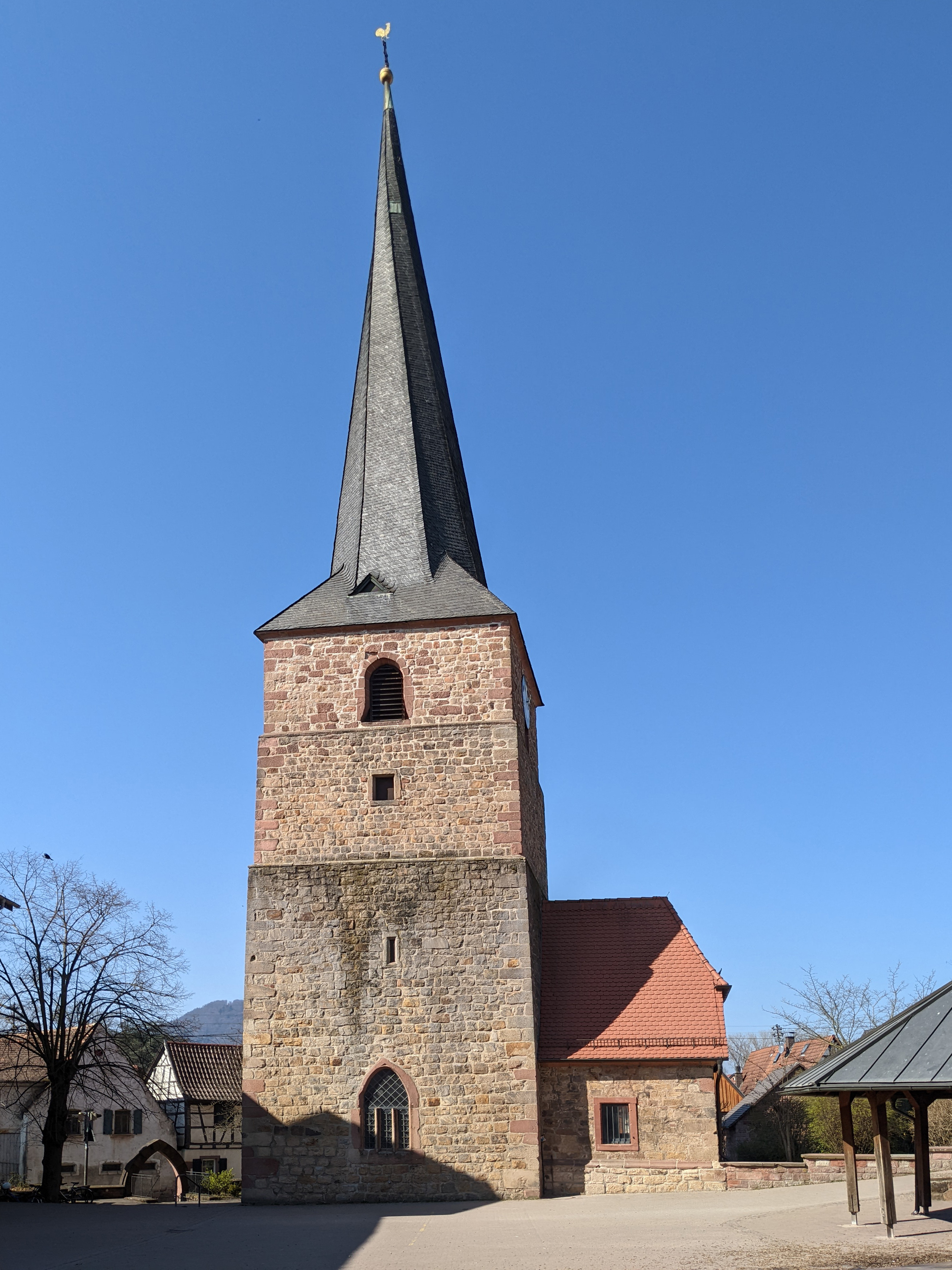

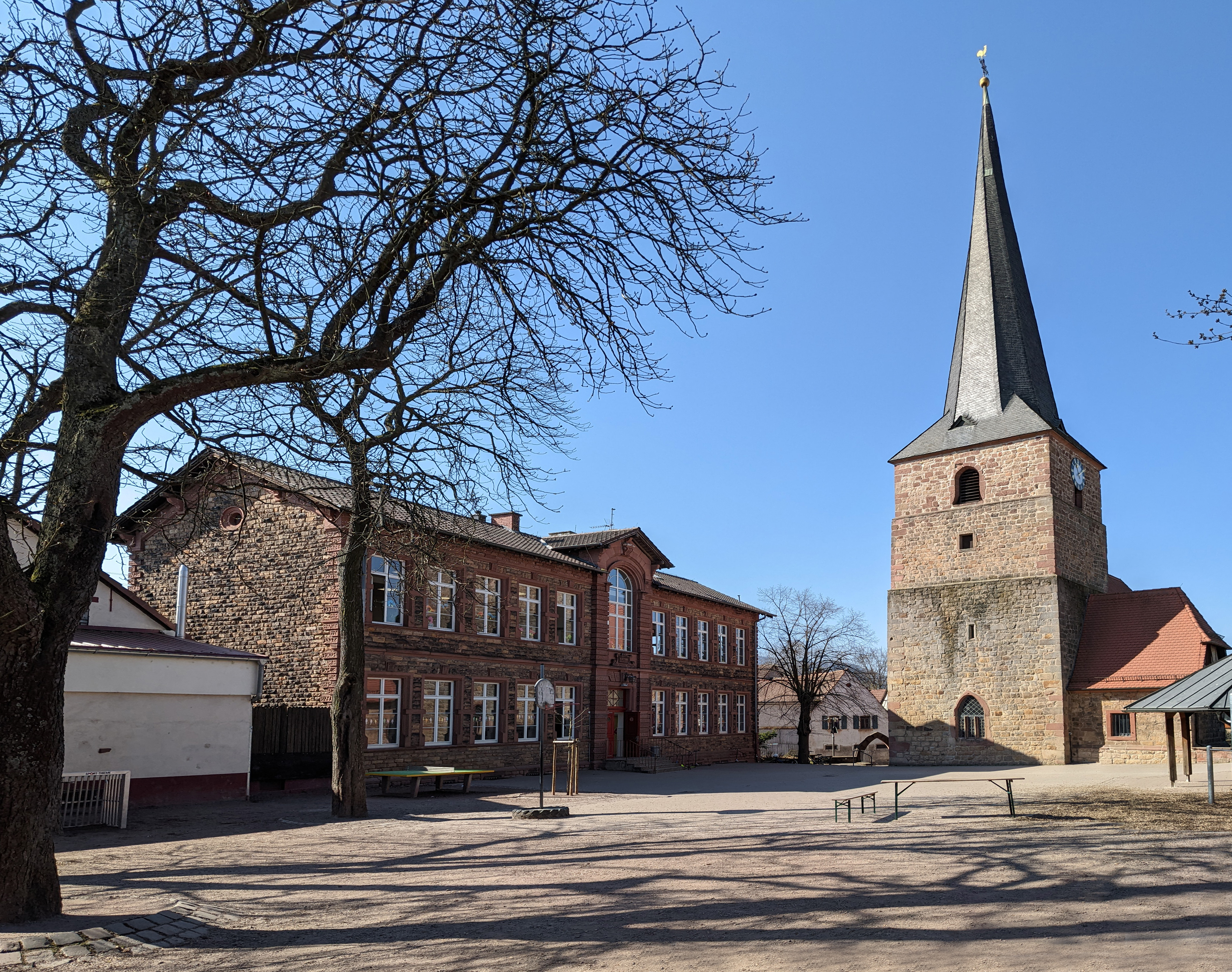

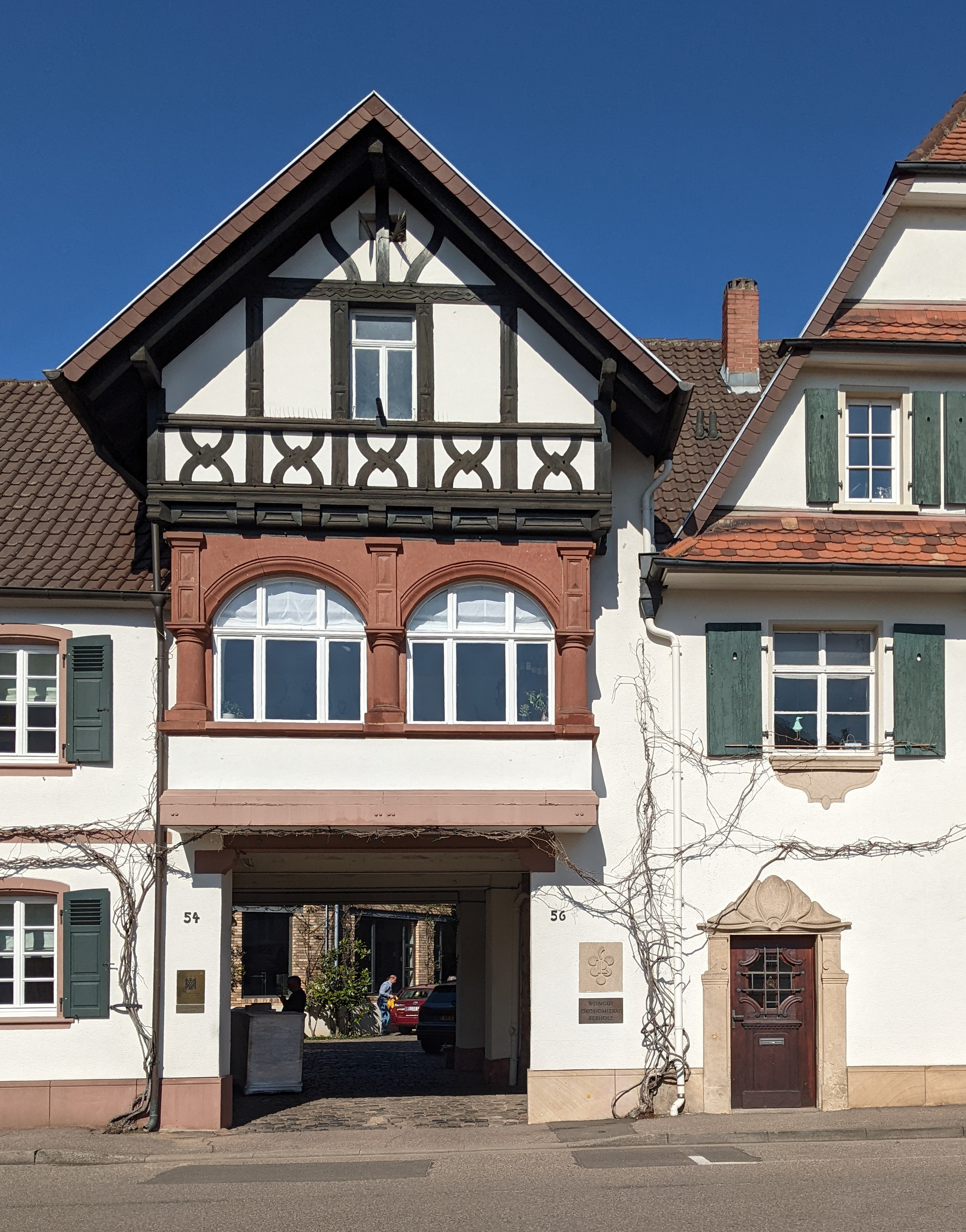

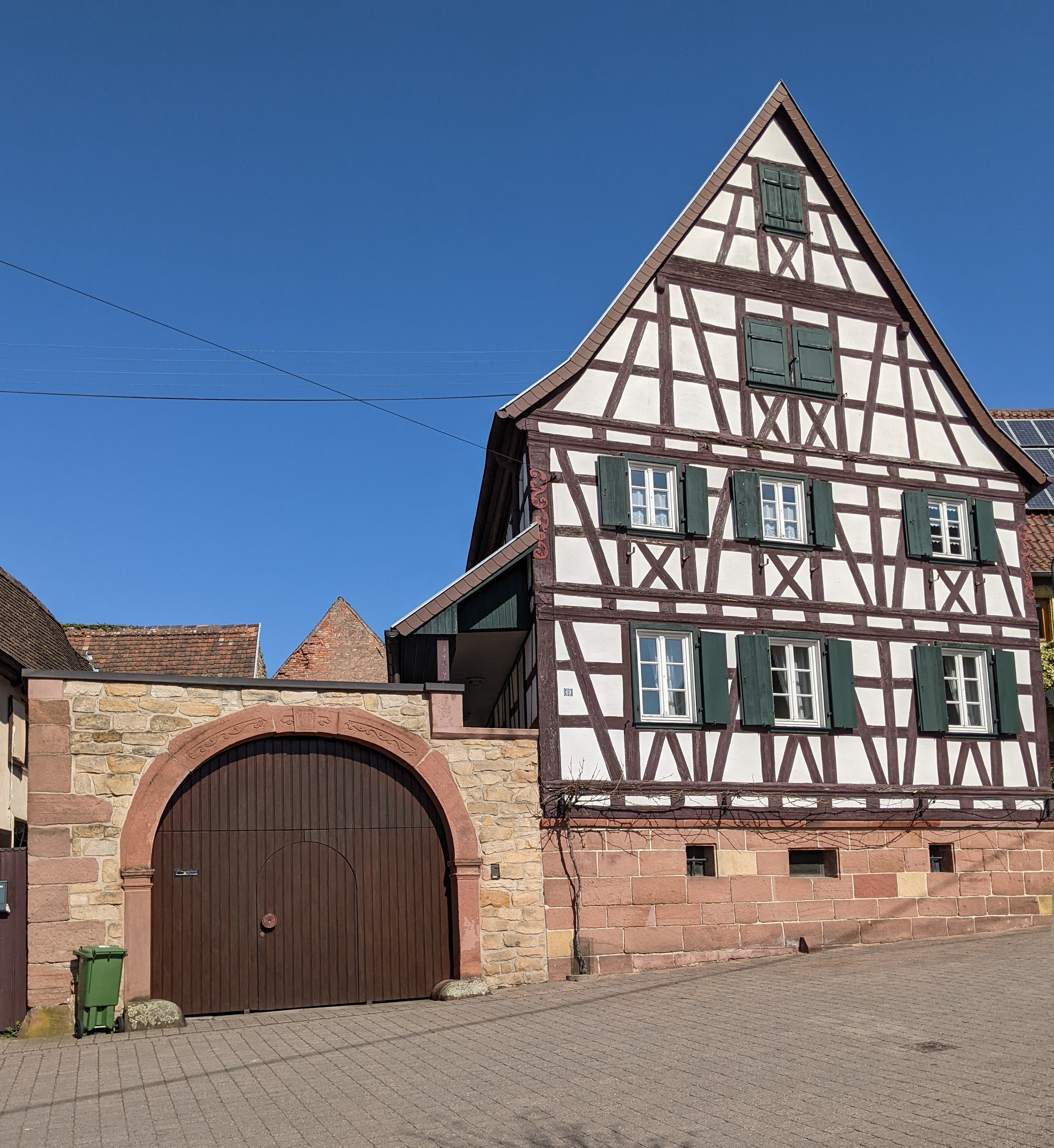

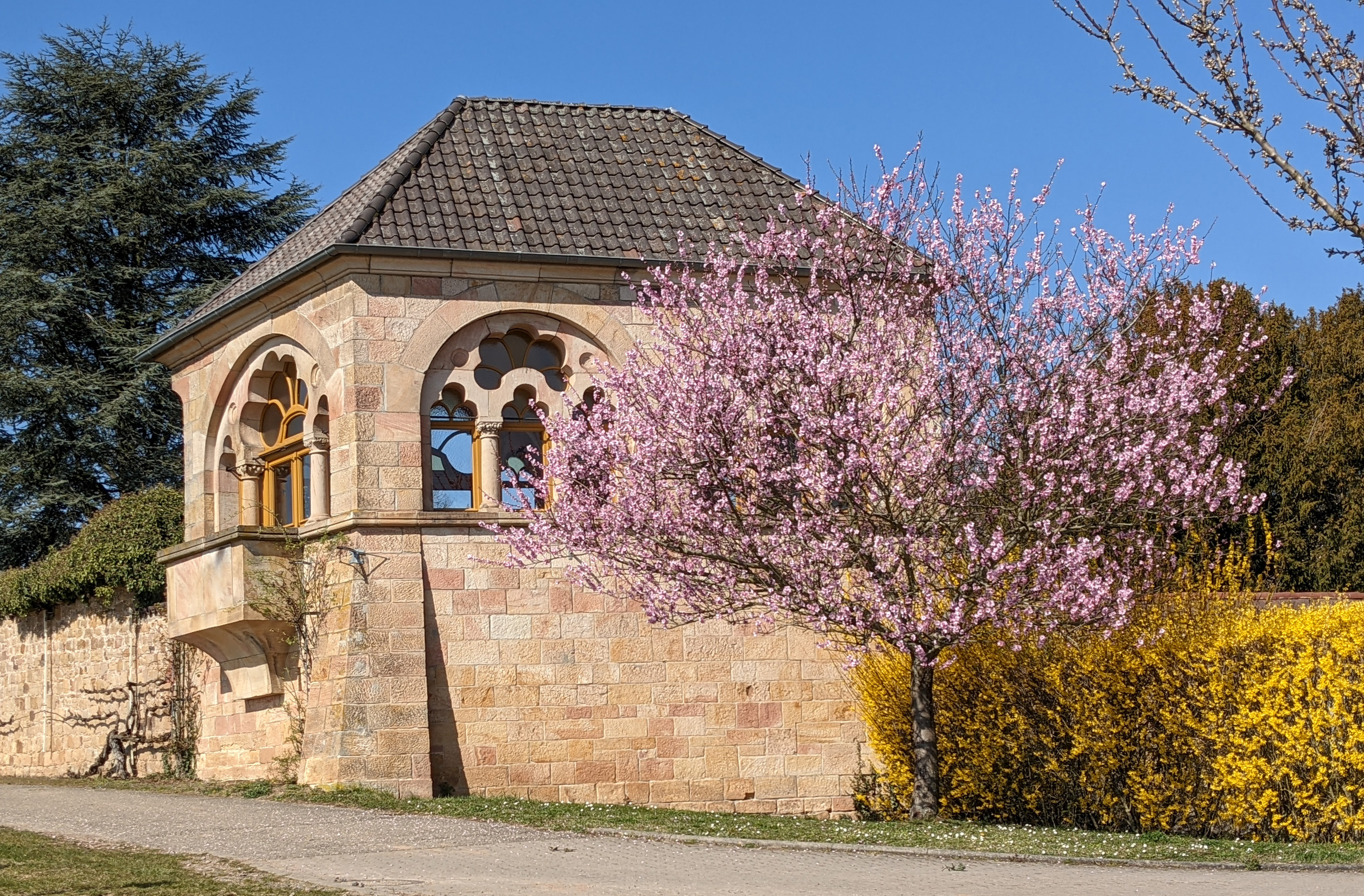

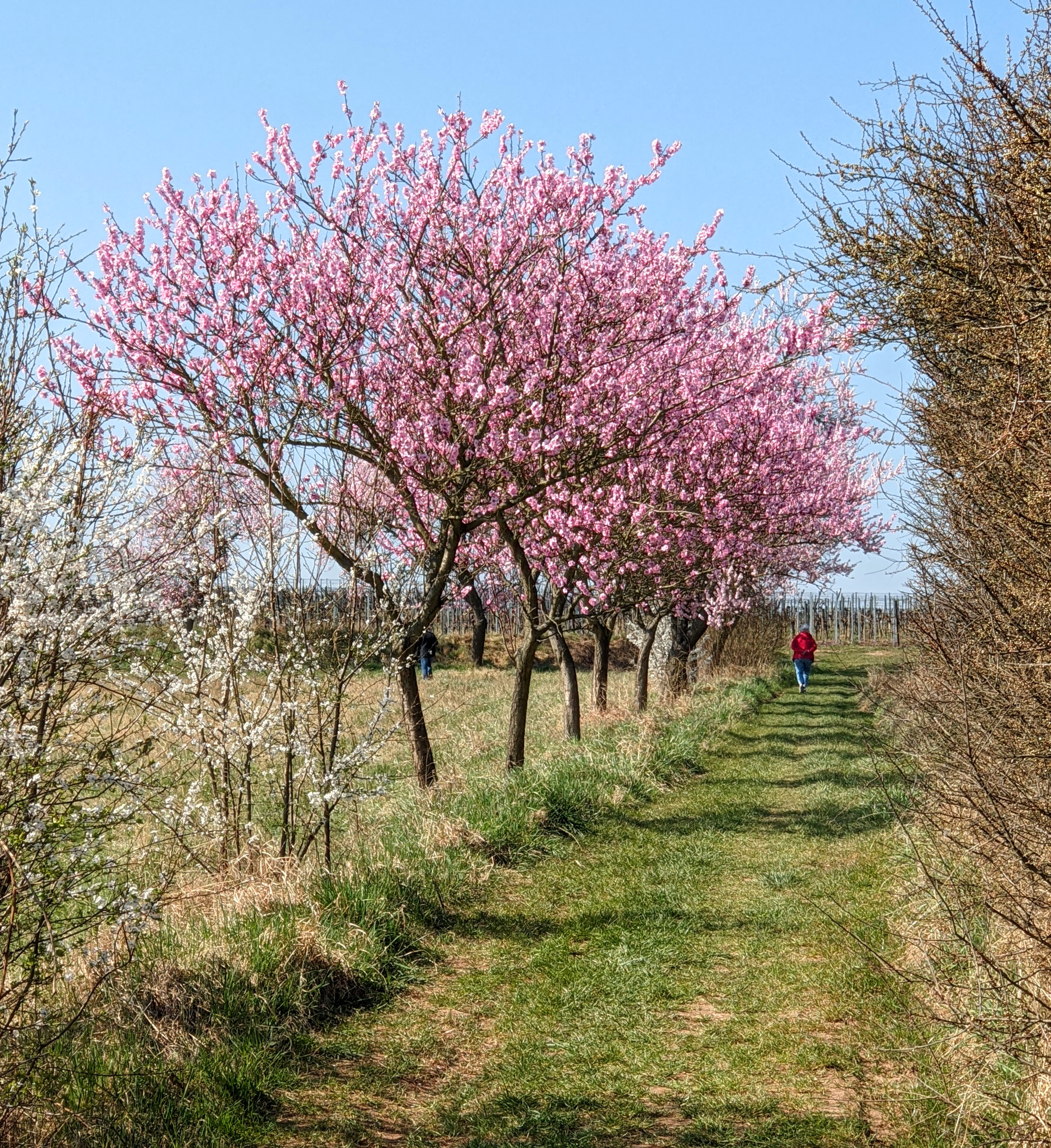

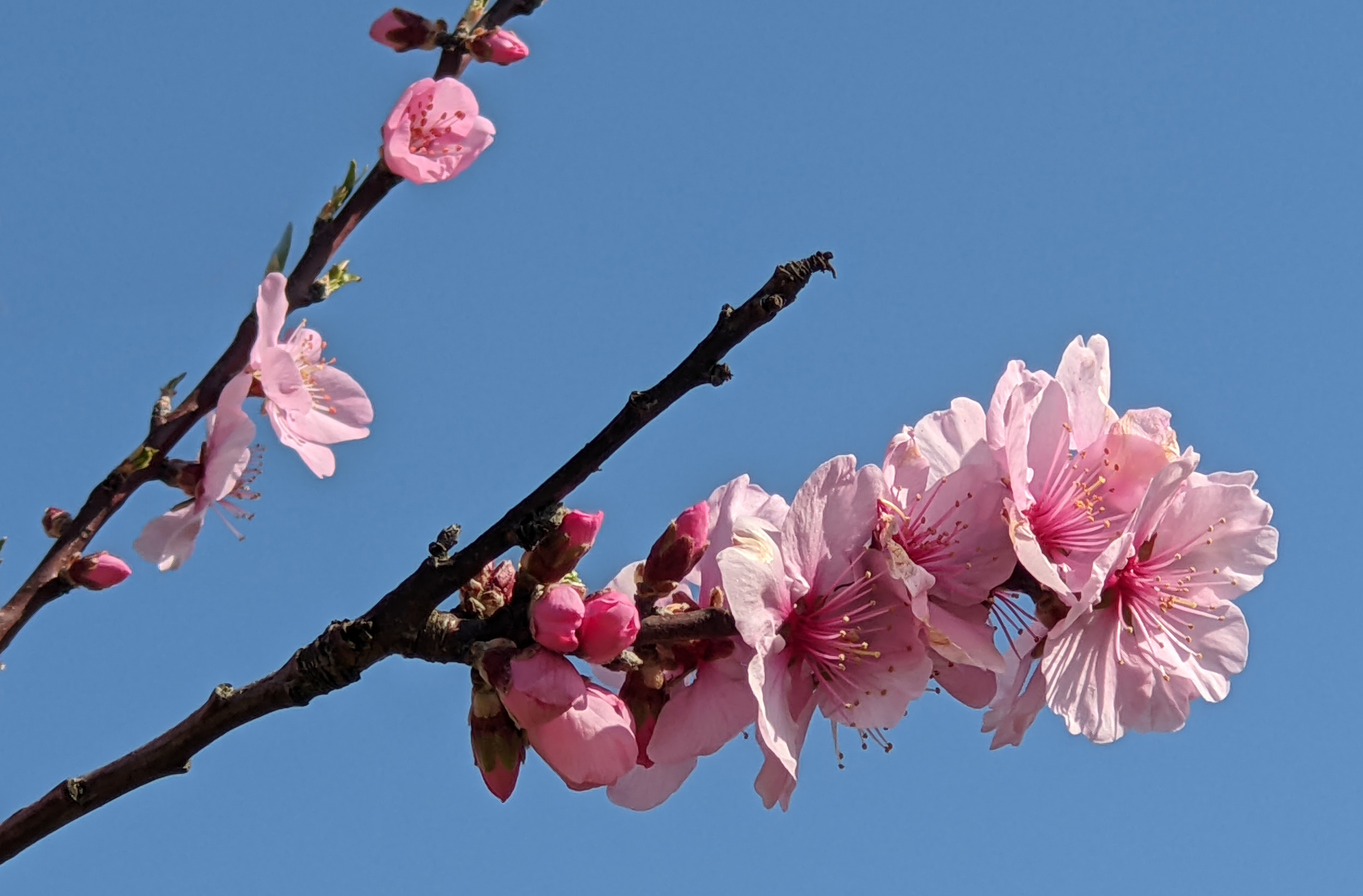
