= Offenbach an der Queich =

- Municipality
- Coat of arms

- Location of Offenbach an der Queich within Südliche Weinstraße district
- Interactive map of Offenbach an der Queich
- Location within Germany Location within Rhineland-Palatinate
- Coordinates: 49°12′N 8°12′E
- Country: Germany
- State: Rhineland-Palatinate
- District: Südliche Weinstraße
- Municipal assoc.: Offenbach an der Queich

Government
  - Mayor (2019–24): Axel Wassyl

Area
  - Total: 15.24 km^{2} (5.88 sq mi)
- Elevation: 131 m (430 ft)

Population (2025-12-31)
  - Total: 6,268
  - Density: 411.3/km^{2} (1,065/sq mi)
- Time zone: UTC+01:00 (CET)
  - Summer (DST): UTC+02:00 (CEST)
- Postal codes: 76877
- Dialling codes: 06348
- Vehicle registration: SÜW
- Website: www.offenbach-queich.de

Offenbach an der Queich is a municipality in the Südliche Weinstraße district, in Rhineland-Palatinate, Germany. It is situated on the river Queich, approx. 6 km east of Landau.

Offenbach an der Queich is the seat of the Verbandsgemeinde ("collective municipality") Offenbach an der Queich.
