= Bornheim (Pfalz) =

- Municipality
- Coat of arms

- Location of Bornheim within Südliche Weinstraße district
- Interactive map of Bornheim
- Location within Germany Location within Rhineland-Palatinate
- Coordinates: 49°13′19″N 8°10′05″E
- Country: Germany
- State: Rhineland-Palatinate
- District: Südliche Weinstraße
- Municipal assoc.: Offenbach an der Queich

Government
  - Mayor (2019–24): Elke Thomas (FW)

Area
  - Total: 3.55 km^{2} (1.37 sq mi)
- Elevation: 139 m (456 ft)

Population (2025-12-31)
  - Total: 1,521
  - Density: 428/km^{2} (1,110/sq mi)
- Time zone: UTC+01:00 (CET)
  - Summer (DST): UTC+02:00 (CEST)
- Postal codes: 76879
- Dialling codes: 06348
- Vehicle registration: SÜW
- Website: Ortsgemeinde Bornheim

Bornheim (German pronunciation: [ˈbɔʁnhaɪm]) is a municipality in the Südliche Weinstraße district, in Rhineland-Palatinate, Germany.
