= Hauenstein =

- Municipality
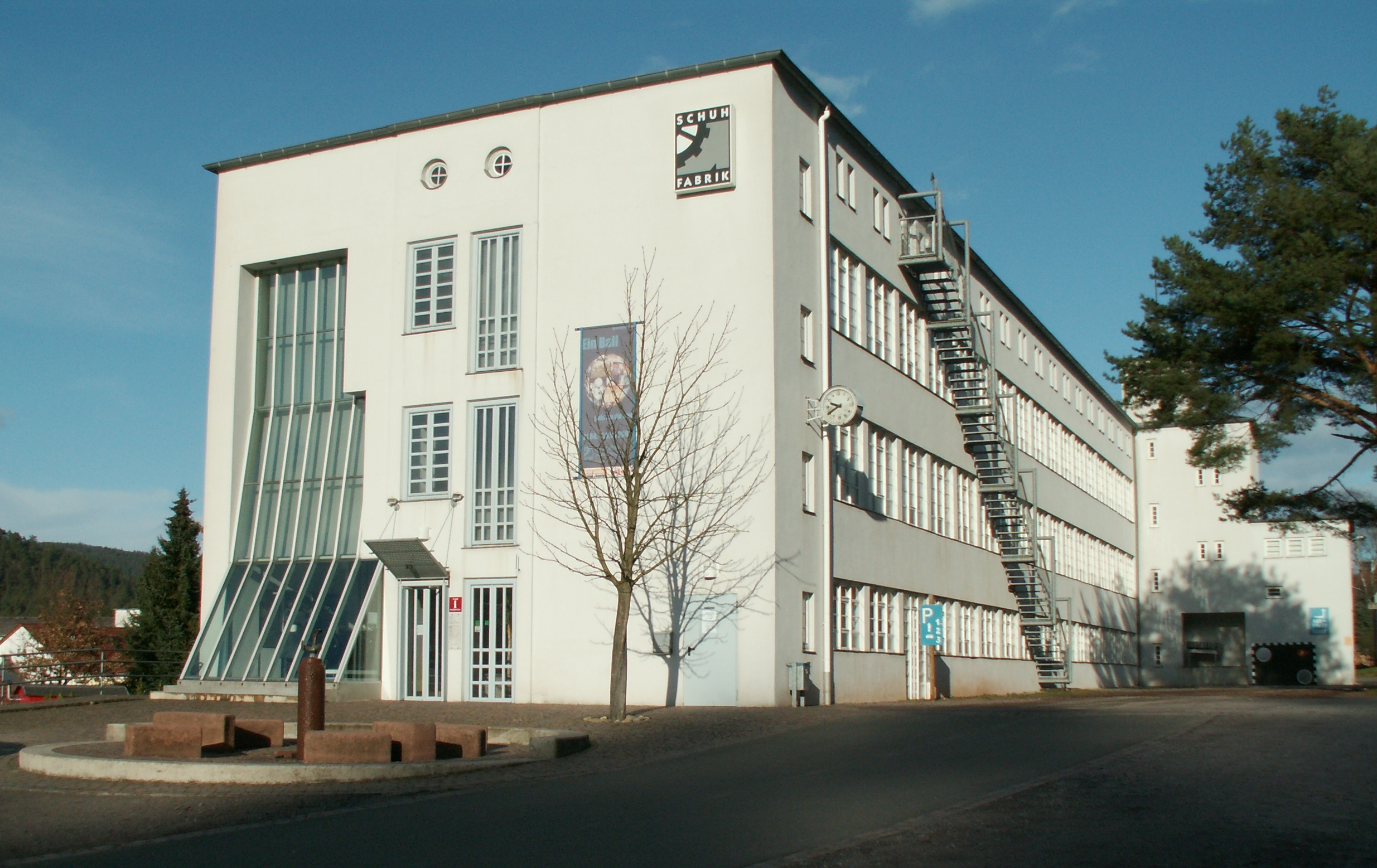
- German Shoe Museum

- Coat of arms

- Location of Hauenstein within Südwestpfalz district
- Interactive map of Hauenstein
- Location within Germany Location within Rhineland-Palatinate
- Coordinates: 49°11′N 7°52′E
- Country: Germany
- State: Rhineland-Palatinate
- District: Südwestpfalz
- Municipal assoc.: Hauenstein

Government
  - Mayor (2019–24): Michael Zimmermann (CDU)

Area
  - Total: 13.91 km^{2} (5.37 sq mi)
- Elevation: 348 m (1,142 ft)

Population (2025-12-31)
  - Total: 3,550
  - Density: 255/km^{2} (661/sq mi)
- Time zone: UTC+01:00 (CET)
  - Summer (DST): UTC+02:00 (CEST)
- Postal codes: 76846
- Dialling codes: 06392
- Vehicle registration: PS
- Website: www.hauenstein.de

Hauenstein (German pronunciation: [ˈhaʊənˌʃtaɪn]) is a municipality in the Südwestpfalz district, in Rhineland-Palatinate, Germany. It is situated in the Palatinate Forest, approximately 20 km east of Pirmasens, and 20 km west of Landau.

Hauenstein is the seat of the Verbandsgemeinde ("collective municipality") Hauenstein.

It is an important centre for the shoe industry, and is home to the German Shoe Museum (Deutsches Schuhmuseum).

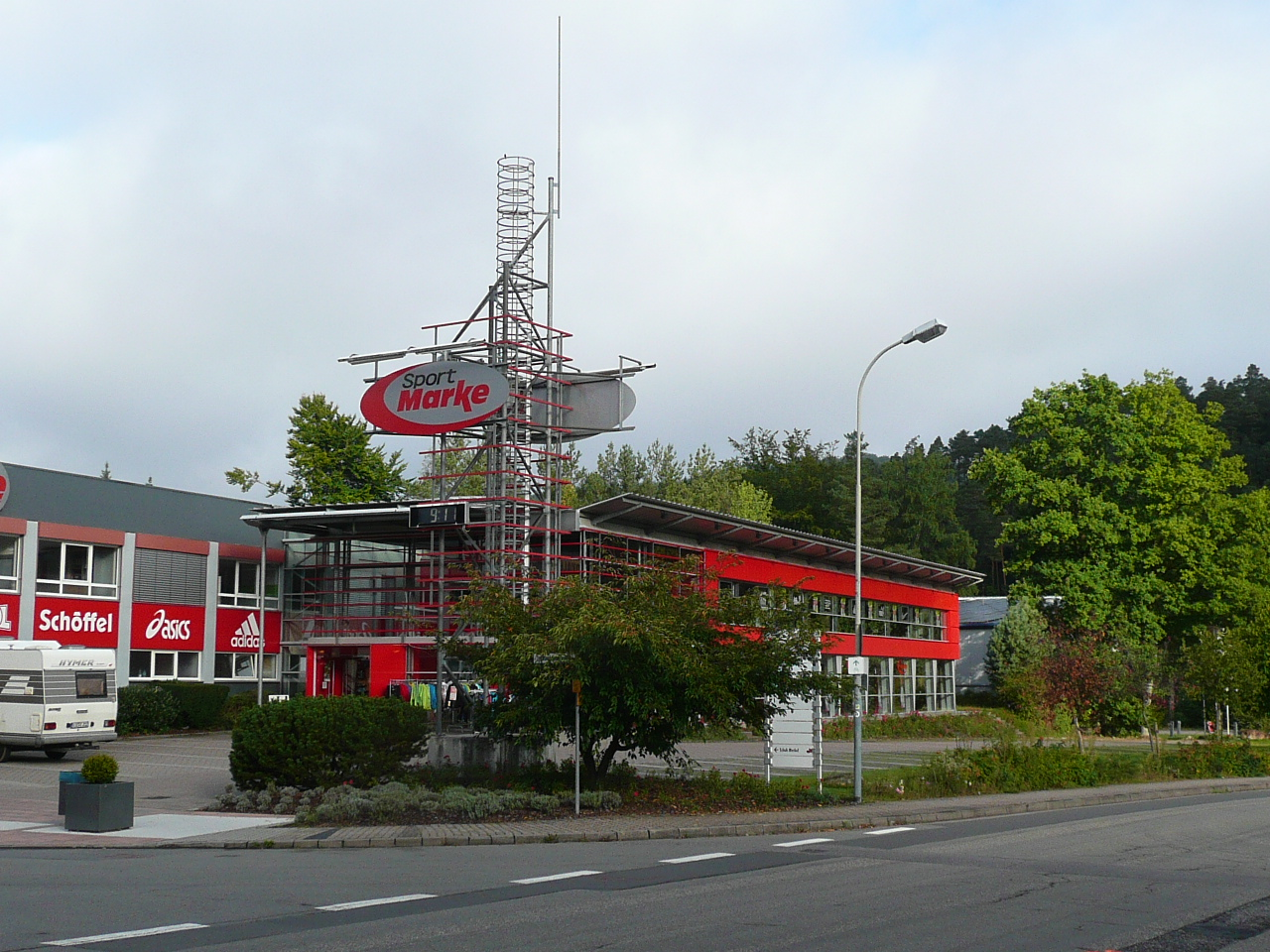
Shoe shopping centre
