= Rinnthal =

- Municipality
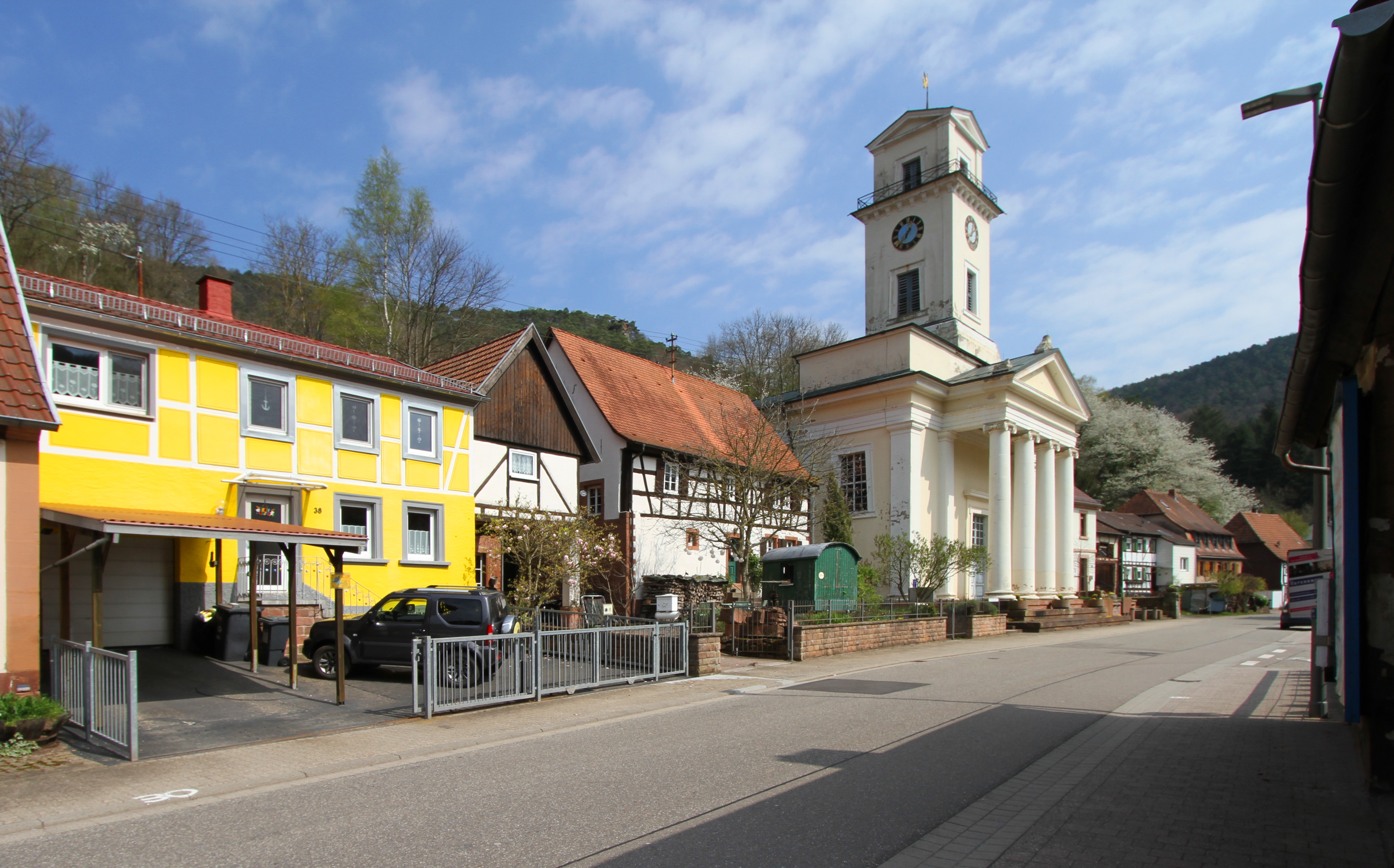

- Coat of arms

- Location of Rinnthal within Südliche Weinstraße district
- Interactive map of Rinnthal
- Location within Germany Location within Rhineland-Palatinate
- Coordinates: 49°13′09″N 7°55′30″E
- Country: Germany
- State: Rhineland-Palatinate
- District: Südliche Weinstraße
- Municipal assoc.: Annweiler am Trifels

Government
  - Mayor (2019–24): Torsten Hertel

Area
  - Total: 13.81 km^{2} (5.33 sq mi)
- Elevation: 190 m (620 ft)

Population (2025-12-31)
  - Total: 671
  - Density: 48.6/km^{2} (126/sq mi)
- Time zone: UTC+01:00 (CET)
  - Summer (DST): UTC+02:00 (CEST)
- Postal codes: 76857
- Dialling codes: 06346
- Vehicle registration: SÜW
- Website: www.rinnthal.de

Rinnthal is a municipality in Südliche Weinstraße district, in Rhineland-Palatinate, western Germany.

During the Revolution of 1848, the town was the setting for a battle between Prussian army troops and Palatinate revolutionary forces who were resisting the invasion.

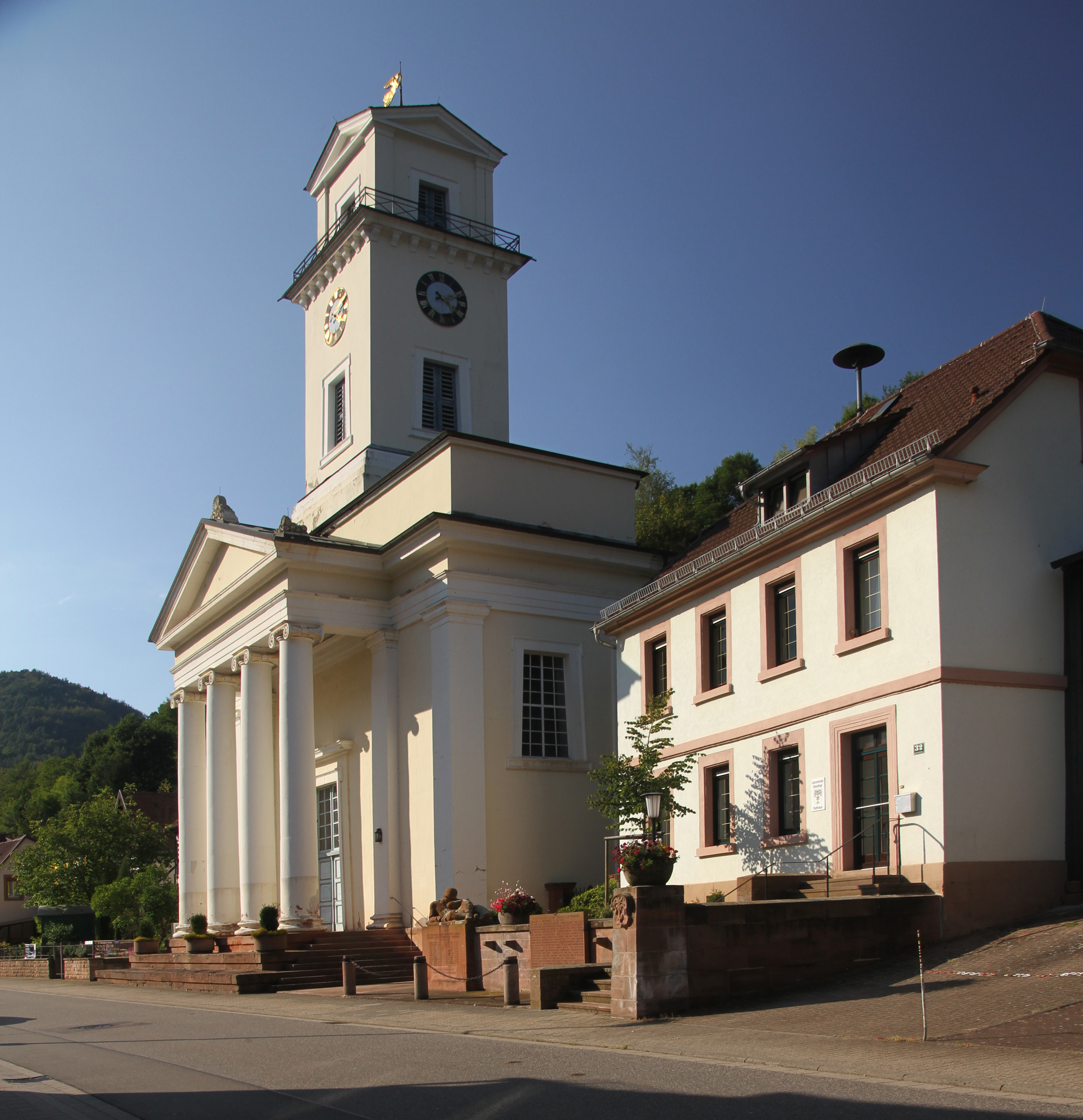
Protestant church and town hall
