= Geology of the Palatinate Forest =

Palatinate Forest
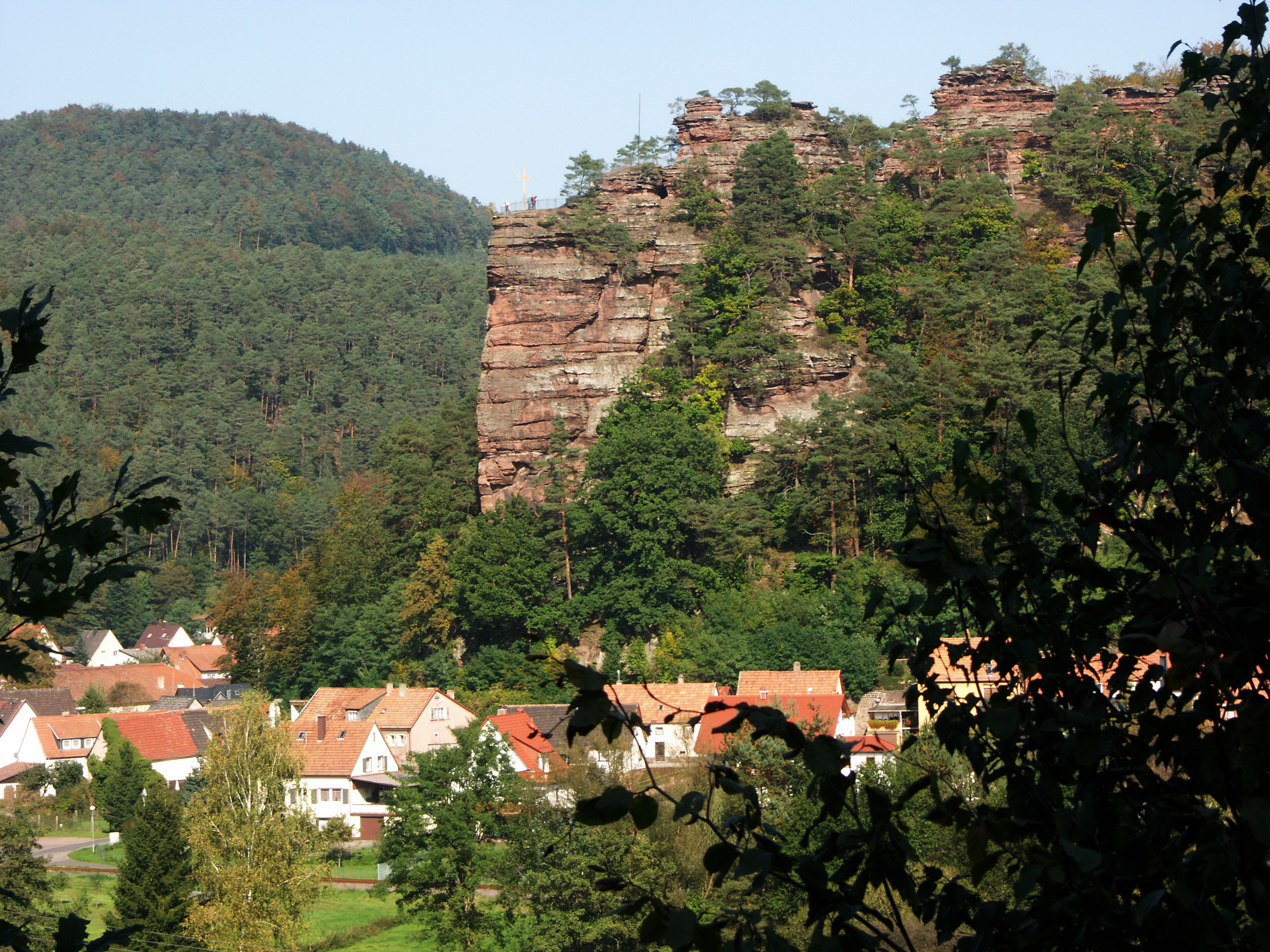
- Rock ridge in the Buntsandstein mountains – the Jungfernsprung near Dahn
- Interactive map of Palatinate Forest
- Coordinates: 49.29°N 7.875°E
- Location: Margin of the Upper Rhine Plain; northern part of the Palatinate Forest/ Vosges mountain complex
- Range: North French Scarplands
- Age: Buntsandstein unit: 251–243 million years; Zechstein unit: 256–251 million years
- Geology: Primarily rocks of the Lower, Middle, and Upper Buntsandstein; rocks of the Rotliegend and Zechstein (in the southeastern part)

Area
  - Total: 1,771
- Elevation: 673 m (2,208 ft)

The geology of the Palatinate Forest, in Germany, is primarily characterized by sedimentary rock layers from the Buntsandstein (Lower Triassic) and, to a lesser extent, the Zechstein (Upper Permian), deposited between 256 and 243 million years ago under predominantly arid conditions. These rocks include fine- to coarse-grained and conglomeratic sediments of varying strength, density, and color. Highly consolidated, silica-bearing medium- and coarse-grained sandstones, such as those in the Trifels Formation of the Lower Buntsandstein, are common, alongside fine-grained sandstones with clay-rich binding, like those in the Annweiler Formation of the Upper Zechstein. The rock formations are divided into zones with uniform structures (e.g., Trifels Formation) and those with heterogeneous structures, such as the Rehberg Formation in the Lower Buntsandstein, where sediment structures vary within small areas.

Approximately 48 million years ago, during the Paleogene, the Upper Rhine Plain began to subside, causing tectonic rearrangement of these rock formations. They were unevenly uplifted, fragmented into blocks, and the Buntsandstein was exposed and tilted.

The current landscape of the Buntsandstein package took shape during the late Cenozoic (5 to 0.01 million years ago), forming a complex relief with deeply incised valleys, diverse mountain forms, and nutrient-poor soils supporting dense forests. In the southern Palatinate Forest, a varied rocky landscape emerged, featuring conical hills and striking rock formations, such as those in the Annweiler and Dahn rockland.

== Geographical context ==
The dominant Buntsandstein and Zechstein rocks shape the surface morphology of the Palatinate Forest and define its natural boundaries. Their distribution extends beyond the Palatinate Forest into the northern and central Vosges, south of the German-French border, without geomorphological separation. This continuity ends at the Weilertal (French: Val de Villé), where basement rocks form the mountain surface. The entire mountain region is part of the German-French Scarplands system, with the Palatinate Forest and Northern Vosges forming a unified natural region extending to the Zaberner Steige.

The German portion, the Palatinate Forest, is demarcated to the north by the Stumpfwald and Otterberger Wald, where it is separated from the North Palatine Uplands, dominated by Permo-Carboniferous rocks. To the east, the Rhine Graben margin, and to the west, younger Muschelkalk layers overlying the Buntsandstein, form natural boundaries. In the south, the German-French border separates the Palatinate Forest from the geologically similar Northern Vosges.

== Geological history ==
=== Mountain basement and Zechstein sandstones ===
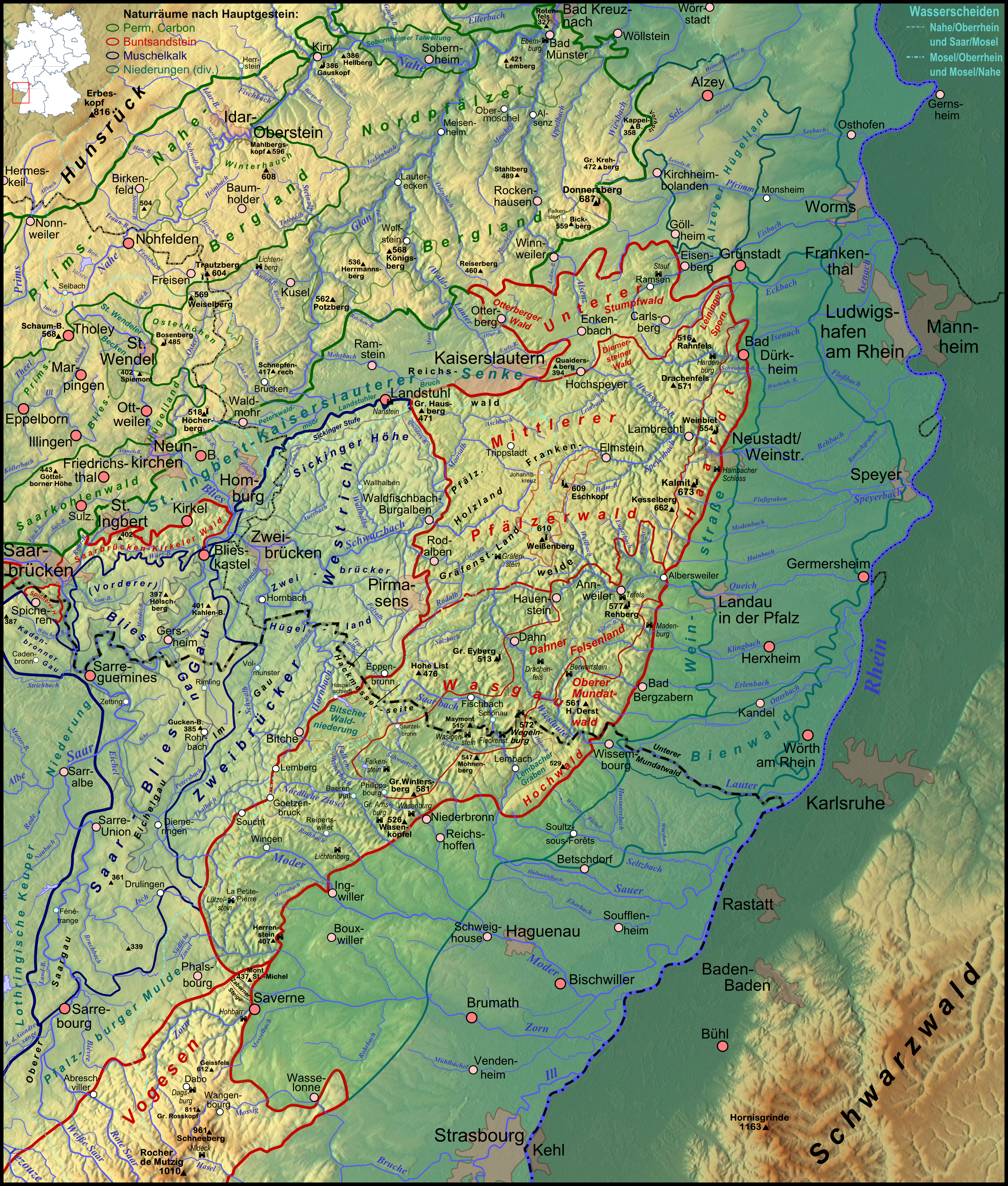
The North French Scarplands, eastern part: Distribution areas of the main rock types (the red-bordered area indicates the distribution area of the Buntsandestein.)

During the Carboniferous (358–296 million years ago), the collision of the supercontinents Gondwana and Laurussia caused crustal folding, forming the Variscan Orogeny, which stretched from eastern North America to Central Asia, including present-day Western and Central Europe. This folded mountain range was eroded during the Permian (296–251 million years ago), leaving remnant surfaces of schist, granite, and gneiss that form the foundation of the modern Palatinate Forest, as seen in other Central European uplands.

In the late Carboniferous, around 315 million years ago, the Saar-Nahe Basin formed, encompassing much of the present-day Palatinate region. From the late Carboniferous to the early Permian (Rotliegend), between 315 and 270 million years ago, various sedimentary and volcanic rocks accumulated, such as the magmatic rocks of the Donnersberg Formation and clay-bound sandstones of the Standenbühl Formation. Tectonic processes in the late early Permian (around 270–260 million years ago) uplifted the Saar-Nahe Basin, forming the Palatine Anticline with the Nahe and Prims Synclines in the northwest and the Palatine Syncline in the southeast.

During the late Permian (260–251 million years ago), large-scale subsidence led to the formation of the Germanic Basin, allowing the Zechstein Sea to periodically advance from the north into the Palatinate region. This resulted in predominantly fluvial deposition of rock layers with a thickness of about 100 meters. In the southern Palatinate Forest, the Zechstein unit comprises four layers, including fine-, medium-, and coarse-grained sandstones and claystones.

=== Formation of the Buntsandstein ===
| System | Series | Stage | Age (Ma) | European lithostratigraphy |
|---|---|---|---|---|
| Jurassic | Lower | Hettangian | younger | Lias |
| Triassic | Upper | Rhaetian | 201.4–208.5 | Lias |
| Triassic | Upper | Rhaetian | 201.4–208.5 | Keuper |
| Triassic | Upper | Norian | 208.5–227.0 | Keuper |
| Triassic | Upper | Carnian | 227.0–237.0 | Keuper |
| Triassic | Middle | Ladinian | 237.0–242.0 | Keuper |
| Triassic | Middle | Ladinian | 237.0–242.0 | Muschelkalk |
| Triassic | Middle | Anisian | 242.0–247.2 | Muschelkalk |
| Triassic | Middle | Anisian | 242.0–247.2 | Bunter or Buntsandstein |
| Triassic | Lower | Olenekian | 247.2–251.2 | Bunter or Buntsandstein |
| Triassic | Lower | Induan | 251.2–251.9 | Bunter or Buntsandstein |
| Permian | Lopingian | Changhsingian | older | Bunter or Buntsandstein |
| Permian | Lopingian | Changhsingian | older | Zechstein |
Major lithostratigraphic units of northwest Europe with the ICS's geologic timescale of the Triassic.

In the Triassic (251–200 million years ago), the Germanic Basin expanded southward and westward, with the Hessian Depression and Palatine Syncline being significant for sediment deposition in the Palatinate region.

From the early to mid-Triassic (251–243 million years ago), Central Europe was covered by a desert landscape shaped by aeolian and occasional fluvial processes. These processes led to sand deposits from the uplands surrounding the Germanic Basin, forming rock layers up to 500 meters thick in the Palatinate Forest. Iron oxide inclusions caused varied coloration, and differing binding types—such as clay-bound versus silica-bound sandstones—resulted in layers of varying strength. The Buntsandstein is divided into Lower, Middle, and Upper subgroups, separated by thin layers of coarse-grained sandstones (conglomerates). These Buntsandstein formations were overlain by approximately 190 meters of Muschelkalk deposits (marl and limestone sediments) from a large inland sea between 243 and 235 million years ago, followed by Keuper sediments (234–200 million years ago).

Further deposits accumulated during the Jurassic (200–142 million years ago) and Cretaceous (142–65 million years ago), reaching an original thickness of about 1,300 meters in the Germanic Basin. However, erosion removed parts of these sediments by the early Paleogene, around 65 million years ago.

=== Buntsandstein Deposition ===
At the onset of the Cenozoic, around 48 million years ago in the Paleogene, the collision of the African and Eurasian plates caused significant folding, leading to the formation of the Alps. The resulting stress field affected areas north of the Alps, with tensile stresses along an ancient Variscan weakness zone tearing apart the upper, rigid part of the subcrustal lithosphere. Softer mantle material (peridotite) rose, overlaying the subcrustal lithosphere and thinning the overlying crust to about 24 kilometers in the Upper Rhine Graben area. This crustal thinning caused updoming, with peak stresses around 35 million years ago leading to deep fractures and subsidence. The crust within the Upper Rhine Graben subsided by about 3,300 meters, forming a lowland, while the graben margins, including the Palatinate Forest, were uplifted by approximately 1,000 meters. These ongoing tectonic processes have shaped the modern scarpland landscape of the Palatinate Forest, with four key effects:

- Erosion of Overlying Strata: Approximately 800 meters of overburden (Dogger, Lias, Keuper, Muschelkalk) were eroded and deposited in the newly formed lowland, exposing the Buntsandstein, Zechstein, and, in some areas, Permocarbon (Rotliegend) layers.
- Tilting of Layers: The updoming tilted the rock layers, which dip gradually from the eastern graben margin westward at an angle of 1 to 4 degrees.
- Uneven Uplift: The Buntsandstein was unevenly uplifted, forming a saddle-syncline structure trending southwest to northeast. A saddle-like uplift in the North Palatine Uplands (Palatine Anticline) contrasts with a parallel syncline in the central Palatinate Forest (Palatine Syncline), followed by another uplift in the Wasgau (South Palatine Anticline). This results in higher Zechstein and Lower Buntsandstein layers in the northern and southern regions, while younger Rehberg, Schlossberg, and Karlstal formations dominate the central relief.
- Fragmentation into Blocks: Uplift and tilting fractured the rock layers into blocks, creating vertical faults and fissures. Major faults, such as the main graben margin fault and the parallel Lambrecht and Elmstein faults, offset layers by up to 100 meters.

=== Surface Morphology Development ===
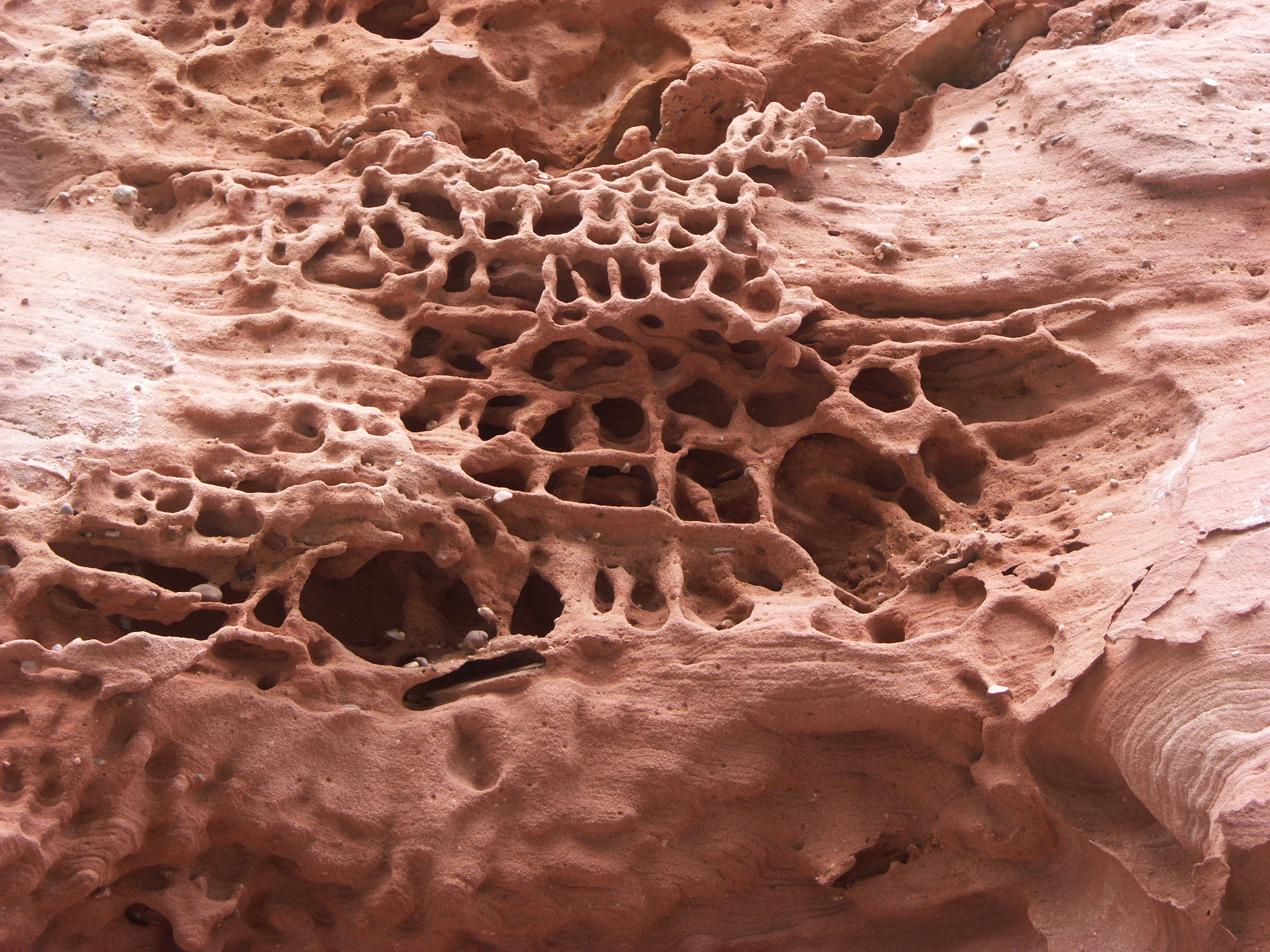
Honeycomb weathering in Buntsandstein

During the late Paleogene (34–23.8 million years ago) and Neogene (23.8–2.8 million years ago), erosion processes further infilled the Upper Rhine Plain. Renewed tectonic uplift at the end of the Neogene (5–2.8 million years ago) established the current elevation of the Palatinate Forest and further exposed the Buntsandstein through erosion. In the Quaternary (2.8–0.01 million years ago), weathering and erosion during cold and warm periods shaped the modern surface morphology, creating a differentiated valley system, diverse mountain forms, and striking rock formations, such as the Devil's Table near Hinterweidenthal and the Eilöchelfels near Schindhard.

== Geological structure ==
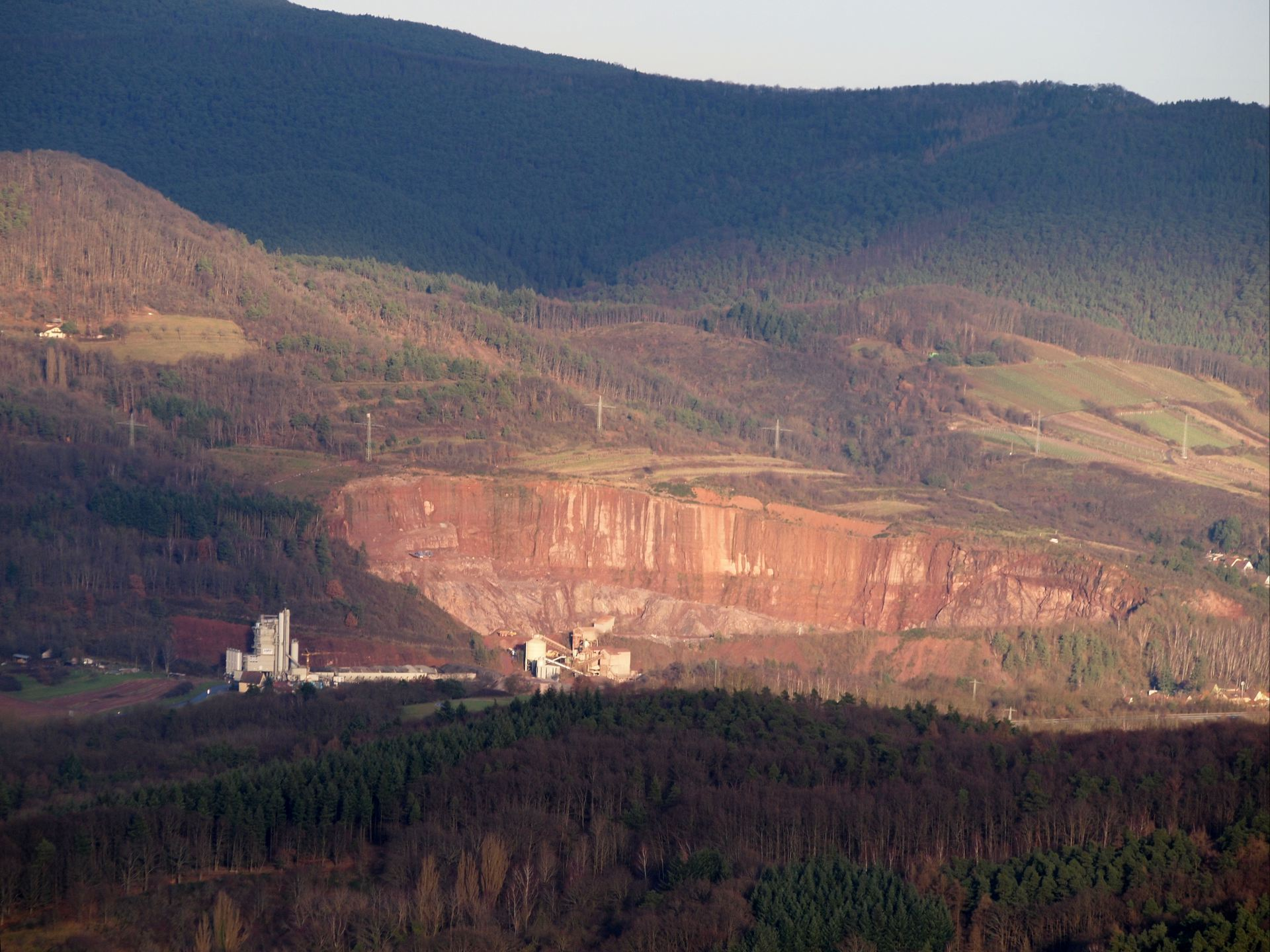
The gneiss quarry near Albersweiler

The geological structure of the Palatinate Forest is derived from its developmental history. Gneiss, schist, and magmatic rocks form the basement, typically overlain by younger rock layers but exposed at the eastern margin in deeply incised valleys like those of the Queich and Kaiserbach. Large quarries, such as those extracting granodiorite near Waldhambach and orthogneiss with granitic texture near Albersweiler, exploit these hard rocks.

=== Permian ===
==== Zechstein ====
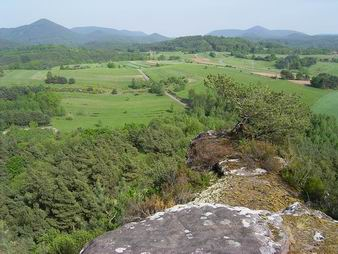
Leveling areas of the Rotliegend and Zechstein: View of Rehberg (left) and Treutelsberg (right)

In the late Permian (256–251 million years ago), rock layers formed in the northern Palatinate Forest, between Eisenberg and Waldmohr, as the Stauf Formation, named after Stauf near Ramsen. These layers, with thicknesses ranging from 70 to nearly 300 meters, consist mainly of pebbly, coarse-grained, brown-red sandstones (conglomerates) highly consolidated by iron oxide. Lithostratigraphically, they are divided into upper and lower parts, separated by nearly pebble-free, less consolidated fine-grained sandstones (formsands). The ore content of these rocks led to iron ore mining in areas like Ramsen (since Celtic times), Erzenhausen (since the Middle Ages), and Erzhütten (since 1725), with processing in Eisenberg.

In the southeastern Palatinate Forest, Zechstein layers consist of finer-grained sandstones with clay binding and shales, extending from Annweiler through Gossersweiler and Silz to areas southeast of Dahn, including Vorderweidenthal, Busenberg, and Bundenthal. With a thickness of 80 to 100 meters, these softer materials have been eroded into larger planation surfaces, with conical mountains of the Wasgau rising prominently. These deposits are relatively nutrient-rich, weathering into fertile soils used for agriculture since the High Middle Ages. Hydrogeologically, the clay-rich layers form aquifer horizons, allowing groundwater accumulation.

The southern Palatinate Zechstein is divided into four layers: the Queich and Rothenberg formations of the Lower Zechstein, about 40 meters thick, contain fine- to coarse-grained sandstones, with the Rothenberg Formation including red-brown claystone and reddish-gray dolomite (Zechstein Horizon). These are overlain by the 40- to 60-meter-thick Annweiler and Speyerbach formations of the Upper Zechstein, with the Annweiler Formation comprising red, massive to cross-bedded fine- to medium-grained sandstones, and the Speyerbach Formation consisting of brown-red to gray-red claystones.

=== Triassic ===
==== Buntsandstein ====
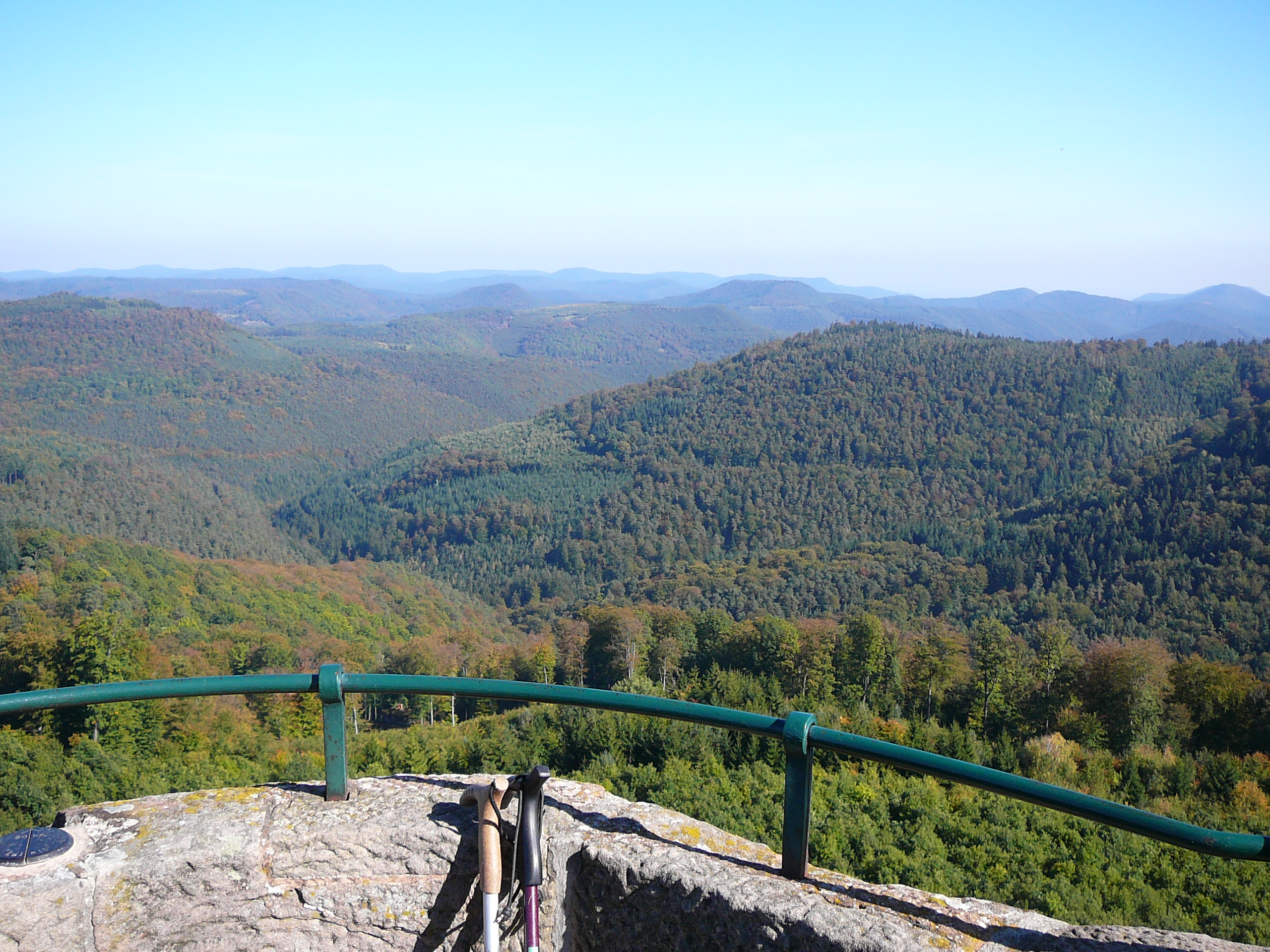
Complex relief structure in the Lower Buntsandstein: View from the Luitpold Tower on the Weißenberg over the Middle Palatinate Forest to the east

The Buntsandstein formations, formed at the start of the Triassic, dominate the left-bank Rhine mountains, including the Palatinate Forest and the Northern and Central Vosges. In the Palatinate, the Buntsandstein is divided into the following formations:

===== Lower Buntsandstein =====
The Lower Buntsandstein, with a thickness of 280 to 380 meters, is the characteristic rock of the Palatinate Forest, dominating much of the upland except the southeastern Wasgau planation surfaces. It contains significant quartz but little feldspar and mica, weathering into sandy, nutrient-poor soils. The rugged terrain, with deeply incised valleys and rocky slopes, limited deforestation and agricultural use since the Middle Ages, preserving the forest's compactness. The Lower Buntsandstein features several hard rock zones separated by thin, clay-rich sandstone layers, divided into three sub-formations:

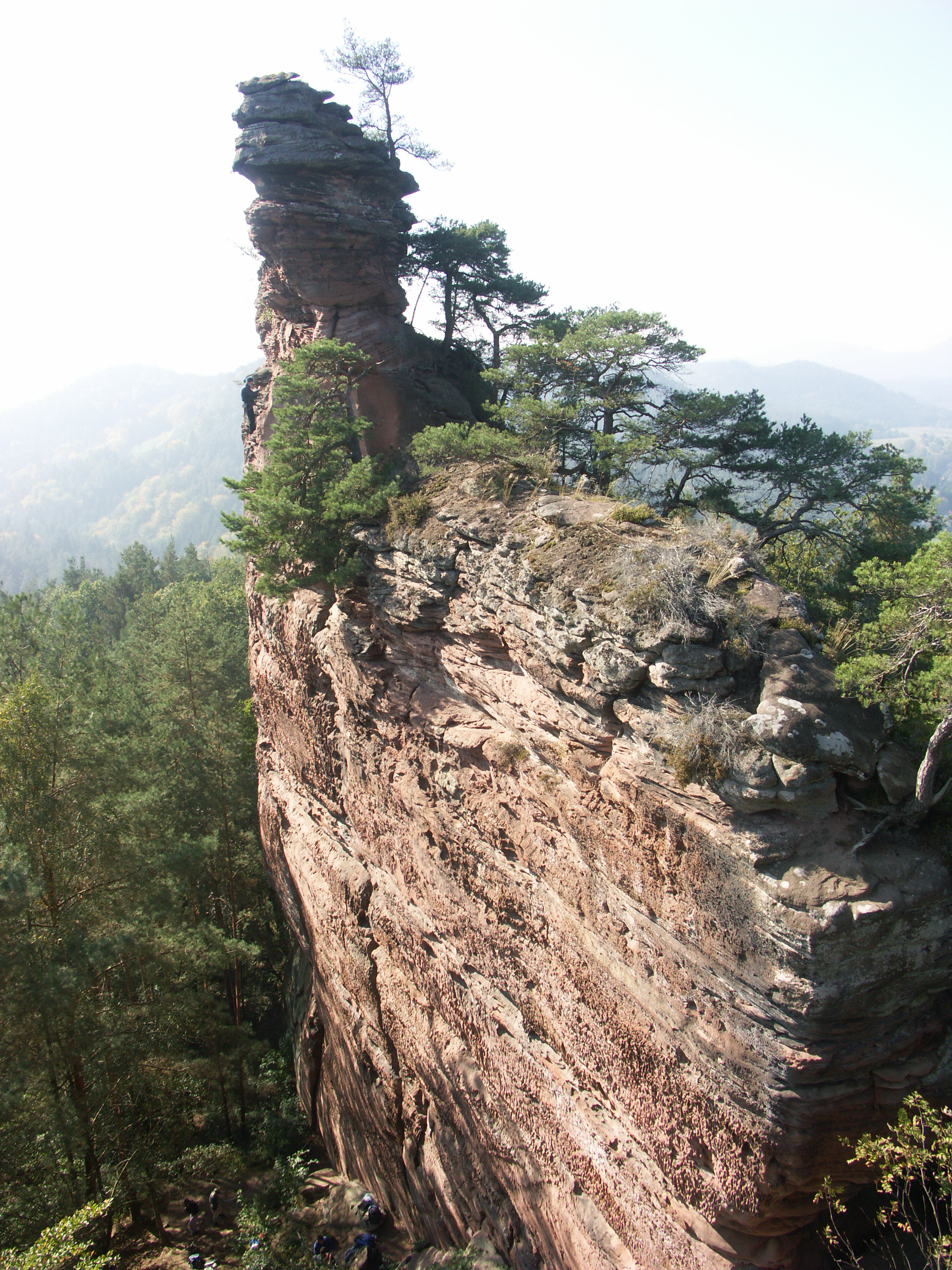
Trifels layers at the Pferchfeldturm, Bärenbrunner Tal

- Trifels Formation: Named after the rock ridge on the Sonnenberg near the Trifels Castle in Annweiler, these compact, predominantly fluvial layers, up to 145 meters thick, consist of purple to light-red, cross-bedded, medium- to coarse-grained sandstones with silica binding, ensuring high strength.
- Rehberg Formation: Named after the Rehberg, the highest peak in the German Wasgau near the Trifels, these layers form the summit area.
- Schlossberg Formation: Named for their occurrence in the Schlossberg caves in Homburg, Saarland, these formations, up to 90 meters thick, consist of coarser material from migrating dunes, with varied colors (red to orange-yellow, occasionally white, green, or purple).

===== Middle Buntsandstein =====
A clay-rich layer between the Middle and Upper Buntsandstein forms another important aquifer horizon. This unit comprises several sub-formations:

- Karlstal Formation: Named after the Karlstal near Trippstadt in the northwestern Palatinate Forest, where these sandstone formations are prominent.
- Upper Rock Zone, Main Conglomerate, and Purple Boundary Zone: The Upper Rock Zone, 9 to 26 meters thick, consists of highly silicified, pebbly medium- to coarse-grained sandstones, forming rocky slopes in the central Palatinate Syncline, such as the Wartenberg in the southwestern Weißenberg area. The Main Conglomerate, up to 15 meters thick, found mainly in the southern Palatinate Syncline, consists of dark red, pebbly coarse-grained sandstones from a deeply incised ancient river system. The Purple Boundary Zone, about 1.5 meters thick, occurs in the northern Palatine Syncline and consists of mica-rich fine sediments with dolomite nodules.

The Karlstal Formation, Upper Rock Zone, and main Conglomerate form prominent rock ridges due to their weathering resistance, with the Altschlossfelsen near Eppenbrunn, nearly two kilometers long, being a notable example. The Kugelfelshorizon, part of the Upper Rock Zone, contains spherical formations eroded due to varying iron content, often surrounded by loose material, as seen in the Kugelfels near Pirmasens.

===== Upper Buntsandstein =====
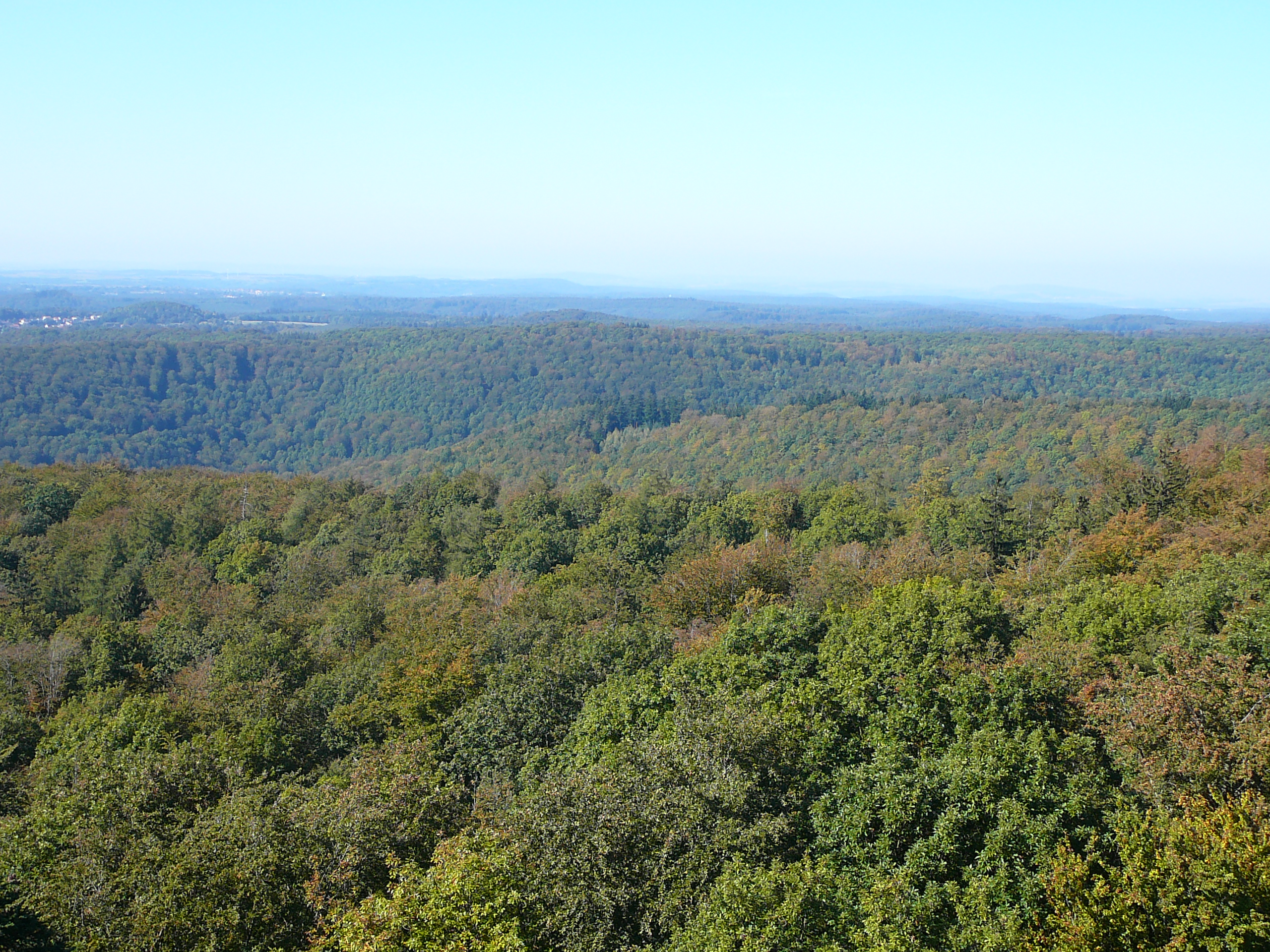
Plateau-like flattened areas in the Middle and Upper Buntsandstein: View from the Luitpold Tower on the Weißenberg towards the northwest

The Upper Buntsandstein, including the Intermediate Layers and Grès à Voltzia, overlies older sediments with a thickness of about 100 meters, influencing the relief in the western and southwestern Palatinate Forest, such as the Gräfenstein Land and Holzland. In eastern areas, these layers were eroded due to the general tilting of the rock layers.

- Intermediate Layers: This 75-meter-thick unit, resulting from fluvial deposition, consists of gray to light-red, occasionally pebbly medium- to coarse-grained sandstones in the lower parts, and purple or brown-red fine sandstones with higher mica, carbonate, and clay mineral content in the upper parts.
- Voltziensandstein: This 25-meter-thick unit contains fossilized plant remains of the conifer Voltziales, indicating changing depositional conditions at the onset of the Muschelkalk period. The lower Werkstein zone consists of red, fine- to medium-grained sandstones, still quarried in places like Schweinstal near Schopp and Eselsfürth near Kaiserslautern. These sandstones have been used historically as building materials for castles, churches, village fountains, monuments, bridges, and railway tunnels, notably in Romanesque structures like the Speyer Cathedral and the Otterberg Abbey.

The Intermediate Layers and Voltziensandstein weather into nutrient-richer soils, suitable for agriculture, leading to early high-altitude clearing islands and the development of villages like Heltersberg, Schmalenberg, and Trippstadt.

== Surface morphology ==
=== Landscape characteristics ===
| Layers | Rock type | Surface morphology |
|---|---|---|
| Basement | Gneiss, Schist | Mountain Foundation |
| Rotliegend, Zechstein | Sandstone, Shale | Planation Surfaces, Terraces, Broad Valleys |
| Lower Buntsandstein | Sandstone, Quartz, Silicified, Thin Claystone Layers | Scarpland Relief, Diverse Forms |
| Middle Buntsandstein | Silicified Quartz Sandstone Alternating with Other Sandstones | Rock Blocks, Block Fields, "Rock Seas" |
| Upper Buntsandstein | Sandstone, Clay, Mica, Carbonates, Fossils | Plateau, Planation Surfaces, Clearing Islands |

Varying hardness of rock layers led to differential weathering and erosion, with softer Rotliegend and Zechstein formations eroding into planation surfaces and broad valleys, while the more resistant Lower and Middle Buntsandstein layers persisted as slopes. Combined with a dense, deeply incised valley system, this created the complex scarpland relief of the Palatinate Forest.

The southern part continues seamlessly into the Northern Vosges, while the western part transitions into the Westrich Plateau. In the northern and eastern parts, multiple scarpland and fault steps are evident, including the Stauf Layer near Ramsen (40–70 meters high) and a higher step of Rehberg and Karlstal formations near Landstuhl (about 200 meters). The eastern margin forms a prominent 300- to 400-meter-high fault scarp, primarily of Lower and Middle Buntsandstein, interrupted only by narrow valleys. South of the Queich, this scarp becomes a chain of isolated conical and ridge mountains, characteristic of the southeastern Palatinate Forest, particularly the Wasgau.

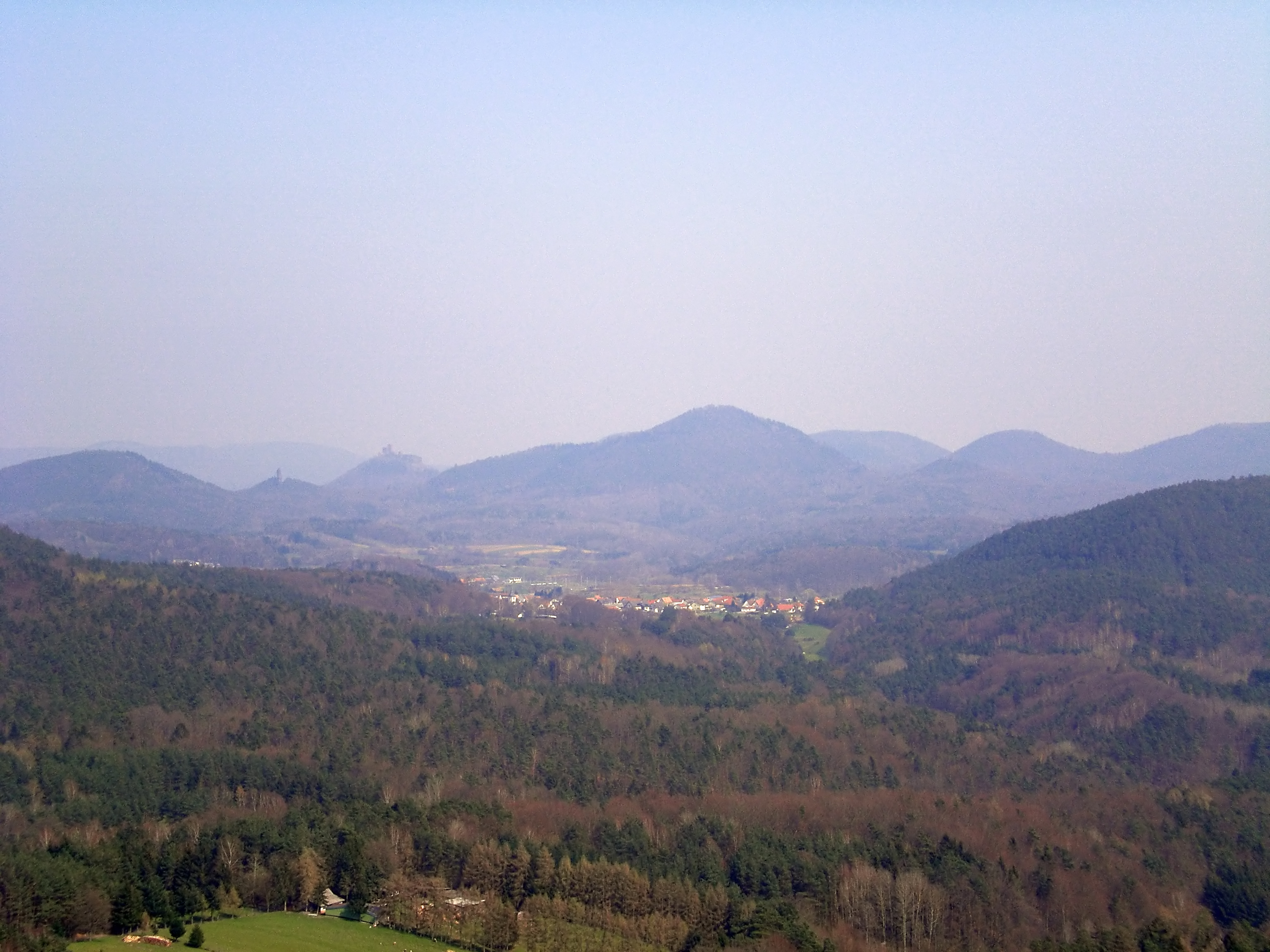
Typical Wasgau landscape with flattened areas and conical hills: View from Lindelbrunn to Rehberg (in the center of the picture)

=== Mountains ===
The Palatinate Forest features diverse mountain forms depending on the dominant rock sequences. The northern and central areas are characterized by towering block mountains and elongated trapezoidal ridges with rocky summits, such as the Almersberg (564 m) and Kesselberg (661.8 m). In the western Palatinate Forest, Upper Buntsandstein formations transition into plateau-like mountains with cleared areas, connecting to the Muschelkalk-dominated Westrich Plateau west of Landstuhl, Waldfischbach, Pirmasens, and Eppenbrunn.

In the southeastern Wasgau, the South Palatine Anticline caused significant uplift and deformation of Buntsandstein layers, leading to erosion and exposure of Rotliegend and Zechstein sediments. Resistant Trifels and Rehberg formations persisted, creating a diverse landscape of isolated block mountains, conical ridges, and pure conical peaks, such as the Rindsberg, Rehberg, Dimberg, and Lindelbrunn castle hill.

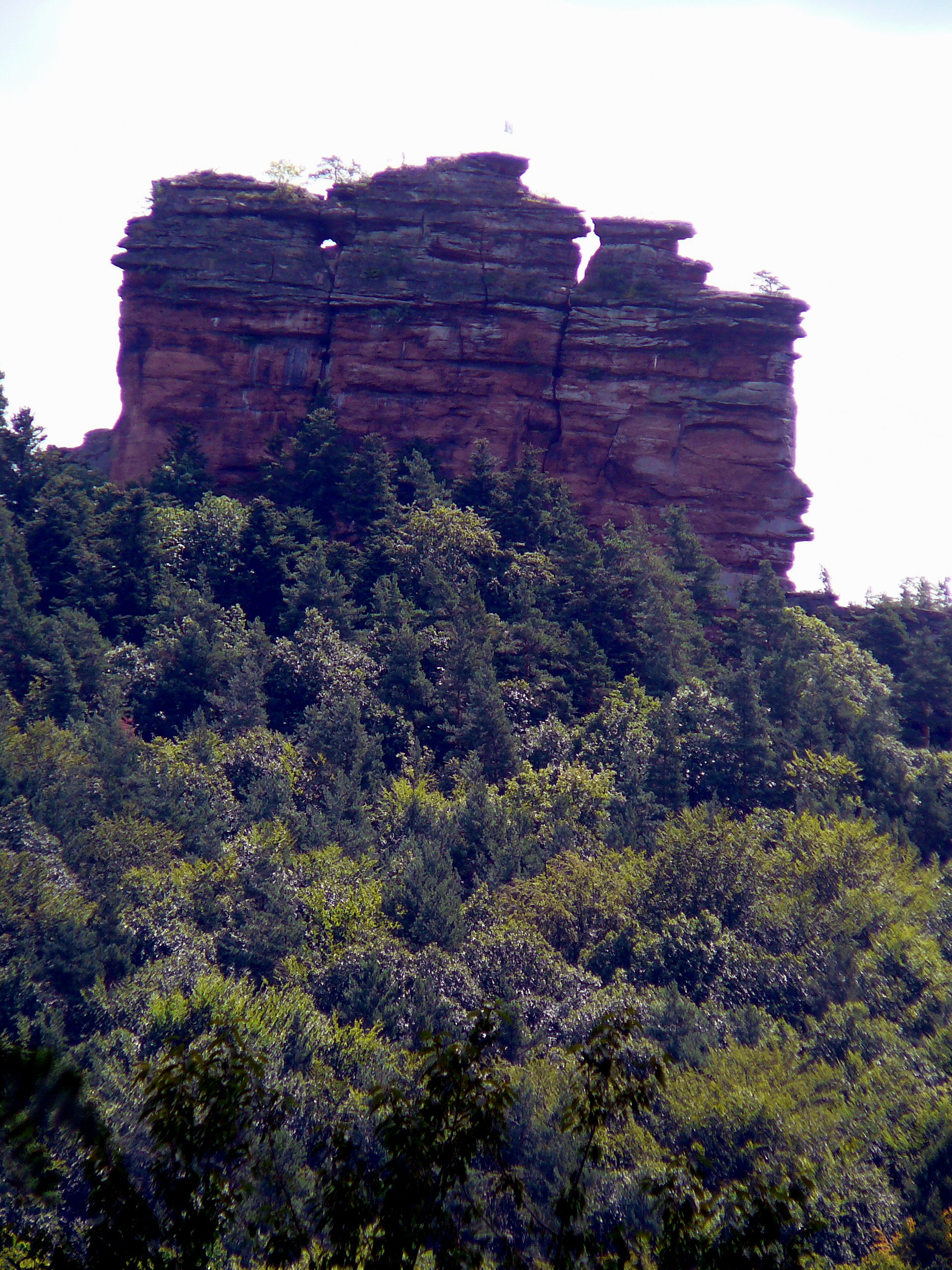
Example of a rock face: The Asselstein near Annweiler

=== Rock formations ===
Weathering and erosion over millions of years have created numerous striking rock formations, particularly in the southeastern Palatinate Forest. Depending on the erosion of the Trifels Formation, these include rock towers (e.g., Hundsfelsen near Waldhambach), rock walls (e.g., Asselstein near Annweiler), rock cliffs (e.g., Dimberg near Dimbach), and rock blocks (e.g., Lindelbrunn near Vorderweidenthal). Small-scale weathering of narrow, variably hard layers produced rock openings, gate rocks (e.g., Eichelberg near Busenberg), and table rocks (e.g., Teufelstisch near Hinterweidenthal). The nearly two-kilometer-long Altschlossfelsen features rock fissures, overhangs, and honeycomb weathering, while rock seas and block fields characterize valley and mountain regions in the central Palatinate Forest.

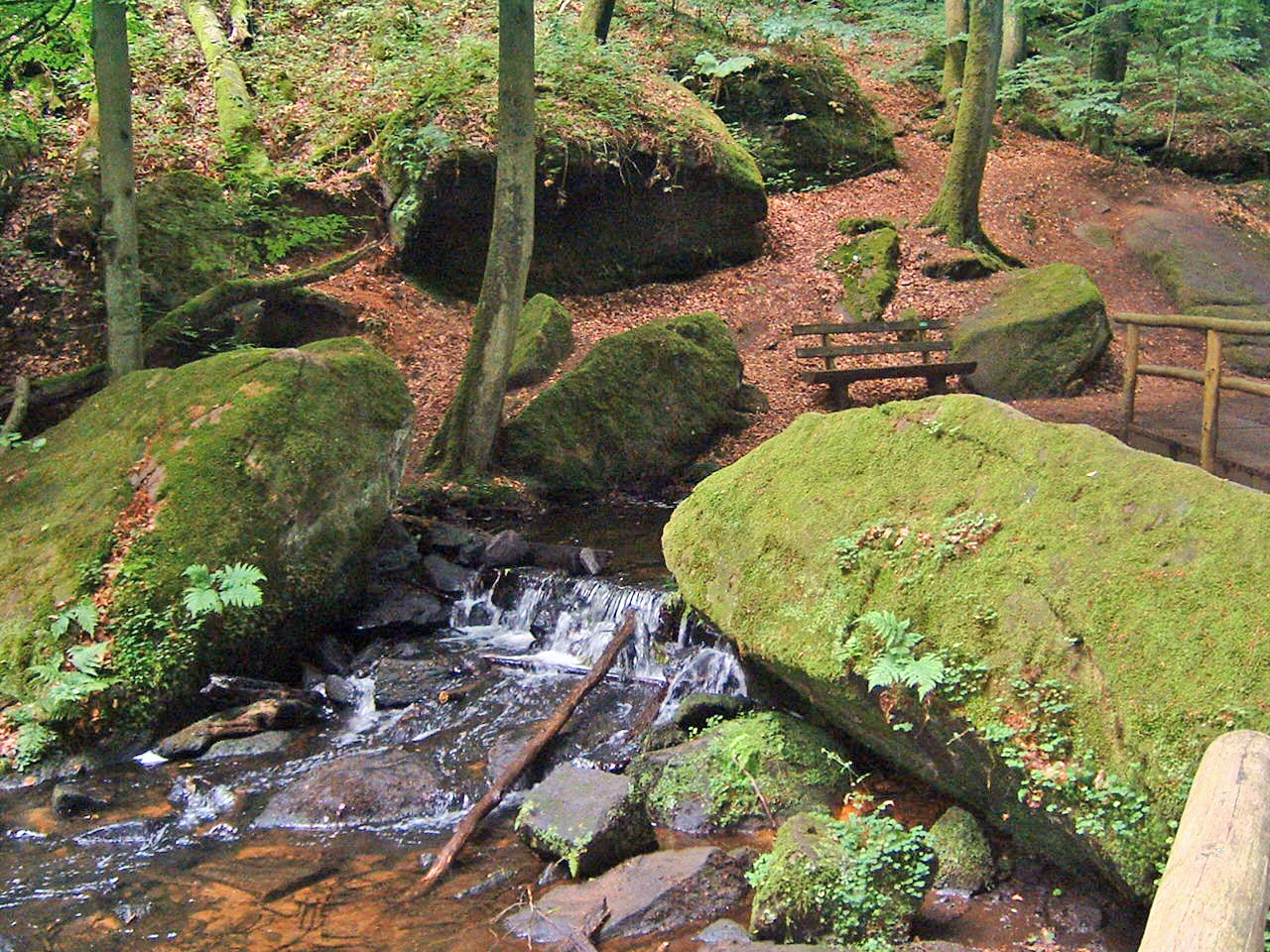
Water-conducting and storing rock zone of Karlstal layers: Moosalb in Karlstal

=== Water resources ===
The Palatinate Forest is notable for its abundant water resources, supporting a complex network of streams, small rivers, and wetlands, including moors, weirs, and small lakes. Consistent water flow ensures a balanced hydrological system during dry or wet periods, driven by high precipitation (900 to 1,100 mm annually in mid to high elevations) and the hydrogeological properties of Buntsandstein rocks. Sandy soils from weathered sandstone enable rapid infiltration, channeling groundwater through rock fissures and cracks as an aquifer.

Groundwater is stored in "groundwater horizons" and released gradually as spring water. The Trifels layers in the Lower Buntsandstein and Karlstal layers in the Middle Buntsandstein are key, supporting rapid groundwater movement and storage via expanded fissures and small cave systems (sandstone karst). High infiltration and low surface runoff mean only two-thirds of precipitation evaporates, with the rest recharging groundwater.

== Notable features ==
=== Past volcanic activity at Pechsteinkopf ===
==== Formation of the volcano ====
While the Upper Rhine Graben's formation triggered widespread volcanism in regions such as the Kaiserstuhl in South Baden, the Vogelsberg in Central Hesse, and the Katzenbuckel in the Odenwald, volcanic activity in the Palatinate graben fault zone was limited to the Pechsteinkopf near Forst. The volcano formed in multiple phases:

In the initial phase, an explosive eruption created a crater filled with pyroclastic materials (tephra), such as volcanic bombs, lapilli, and ash. In a subsequent phase, magma likely rose calmly in an effusive eruption, cooling and solidifying gradually. Within the volcanic conduit, dark columns of nephelinite formed, standing vertically or inclined within the tephra, though it is uncertain whether the magma reached the surface. Some authors suggest that gas explosions during the effusive phase fragmented these columns into blocks, while others propose that the steeply inclined fissures visible in the conduit resulted from later tectonic movements in the graben fault.

Estimates of the volcano's age vary: older studies suggested 29 or 35 million years, while recent geological analyses, including potassium-argon dating, indicate an age of 53 million years.

Until the 1980s, basalt rock was extensively quarried at the site. The now-abandoned quarry serves as a geotope, where visitors can observe the results of volcanic processes and the rock deposits described above.

== See also ==
- Geology of Germany
