= Eußerbach =

River in Germany

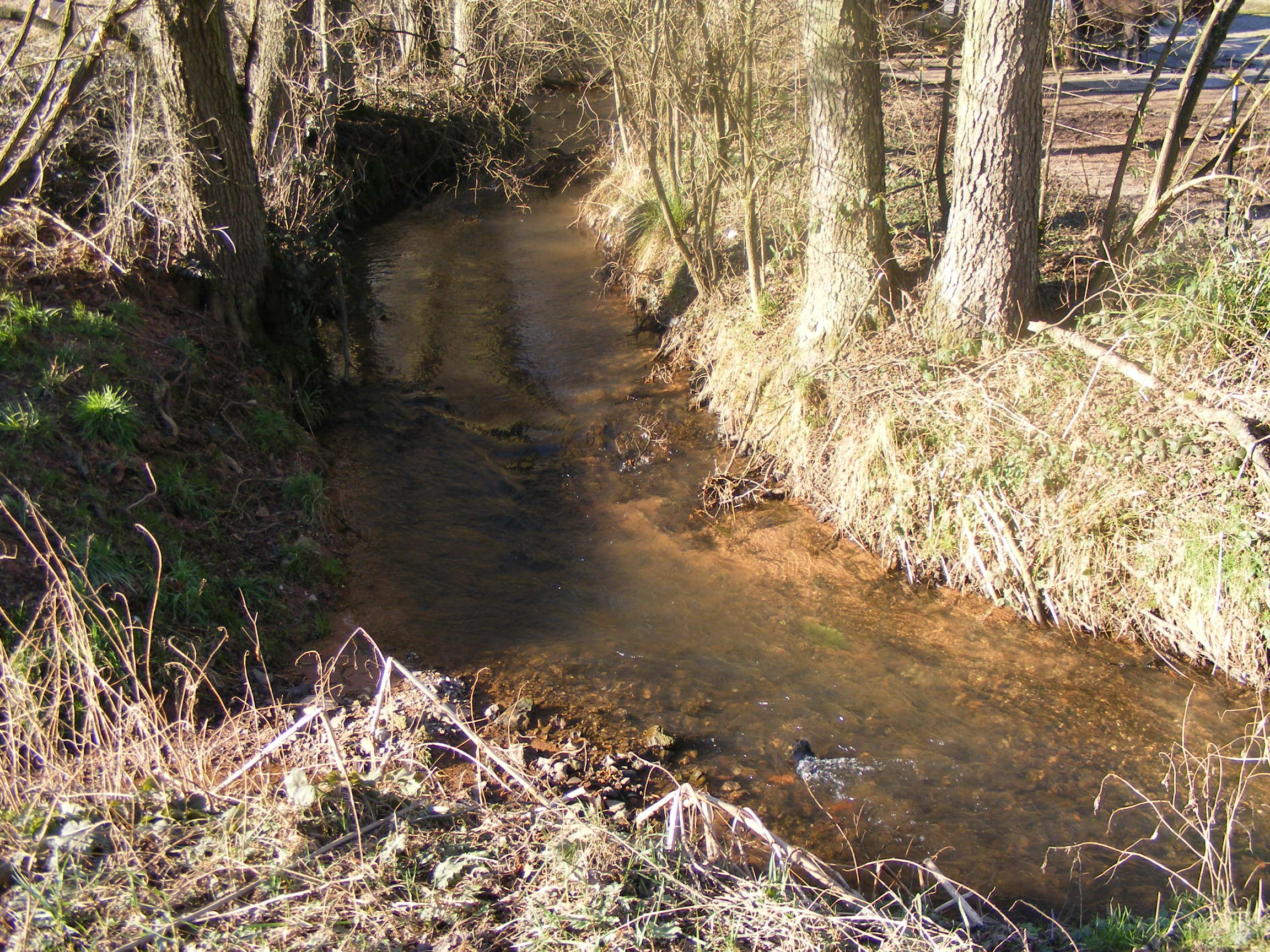
- The Eußerbach below Eußerthal

Location
- Location: Haardt: Dahn-Annweiler Rock Country; Germany Rhineland-Palatinate Südliche Weinstraße
- Reference no.: DE: 237726

Physical characteristics
- Source
  - location: near the Pfaffenkopf in the Central Palatine Forest
  - coordinates: 49°17′20″N 7°58′30″E
  - elevation: ca. 348 m above sea level (NHN)
- Mouth
  - location: confluence: with the Dernbach to form the Eisbach
  - coordinates: 49°13′47″N 7°59′53″E
  - elevation: ca. 174 m above sea level (NHN)
- Length: 8.9 km (10.48 km including Eisbach)
- Basin size: 32.89 km² (49.75 km² including Eisbach)

Basin features
- Progression: Eisbach→ Queich→ Rhine→ North Sea
- River system: Rhine
- Landmarks: Small towns: Annweiler am Trifels; Villages: Eußerthal
- Tributaries
  - left: → see Tributaries
  - right: → see Tributaries
- Waterbodies: Reservoirs: Forellenteich Schweinswoog north of Eußerthal

The Eußerbach (German pronunciation: [ˈɔʏsɐbax]) forms the right, northwestern headstream, over 11 kilometres long, of the Eisbach river in the county of Südliche Weinstraße, in the German federal state of Rhineland-Palatinate.

== Sights ==
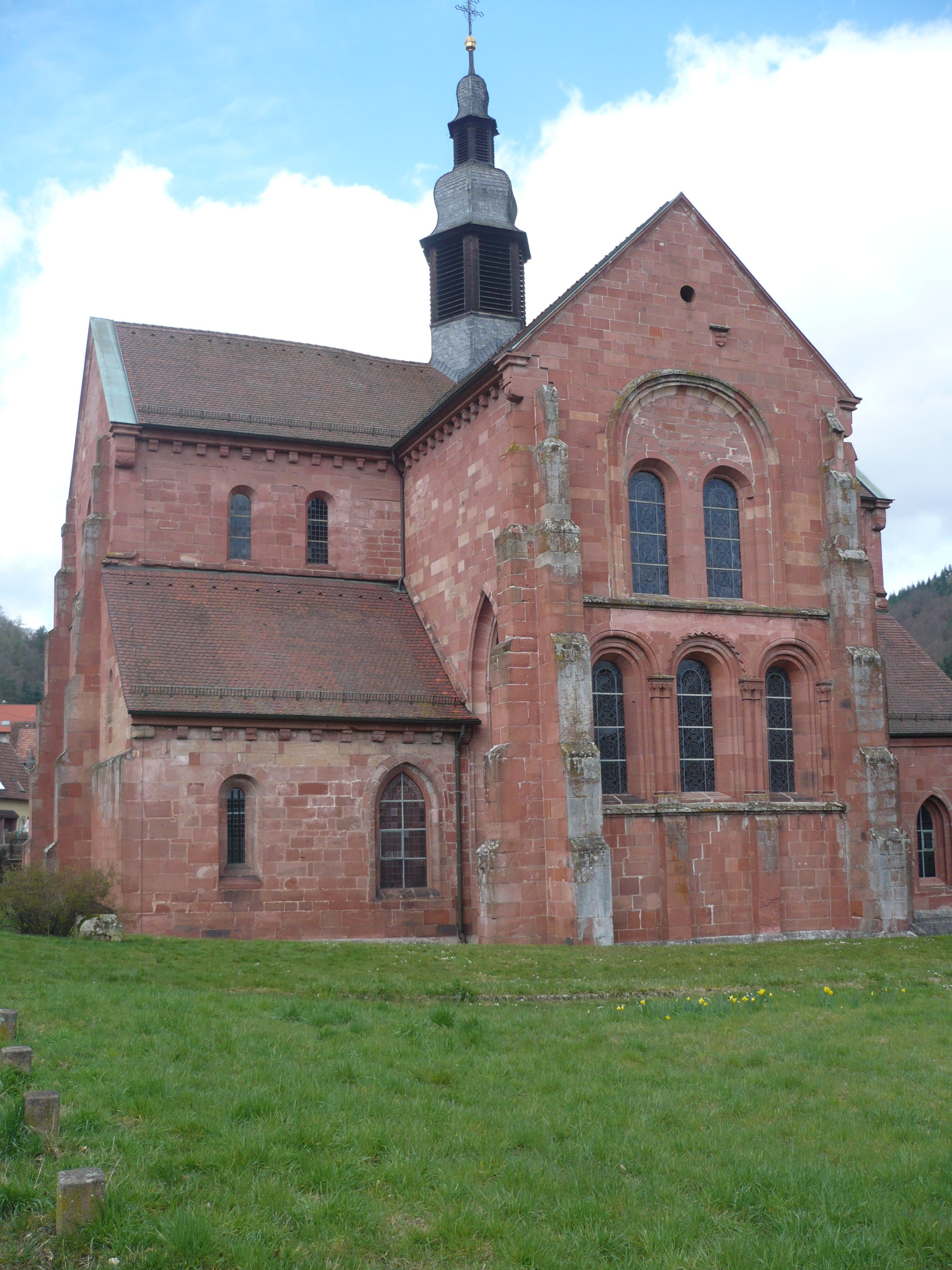
The abbey church of Eußerthal

Abbey Church (Klosterkirche) – The historically most important building in the valley of the Eußerbach is the Romanesque church of St. Bernard which belonged to the former Cistercian abbey of Eußerthal.

Viewing points – The L 505 state road, which climbs from about 170 metres above sea level in the south to heights of over 500 metres, is very picturesque and has several high viewing points. The surrounding area is largely natural.
