= Rehberg (Wasgau) =

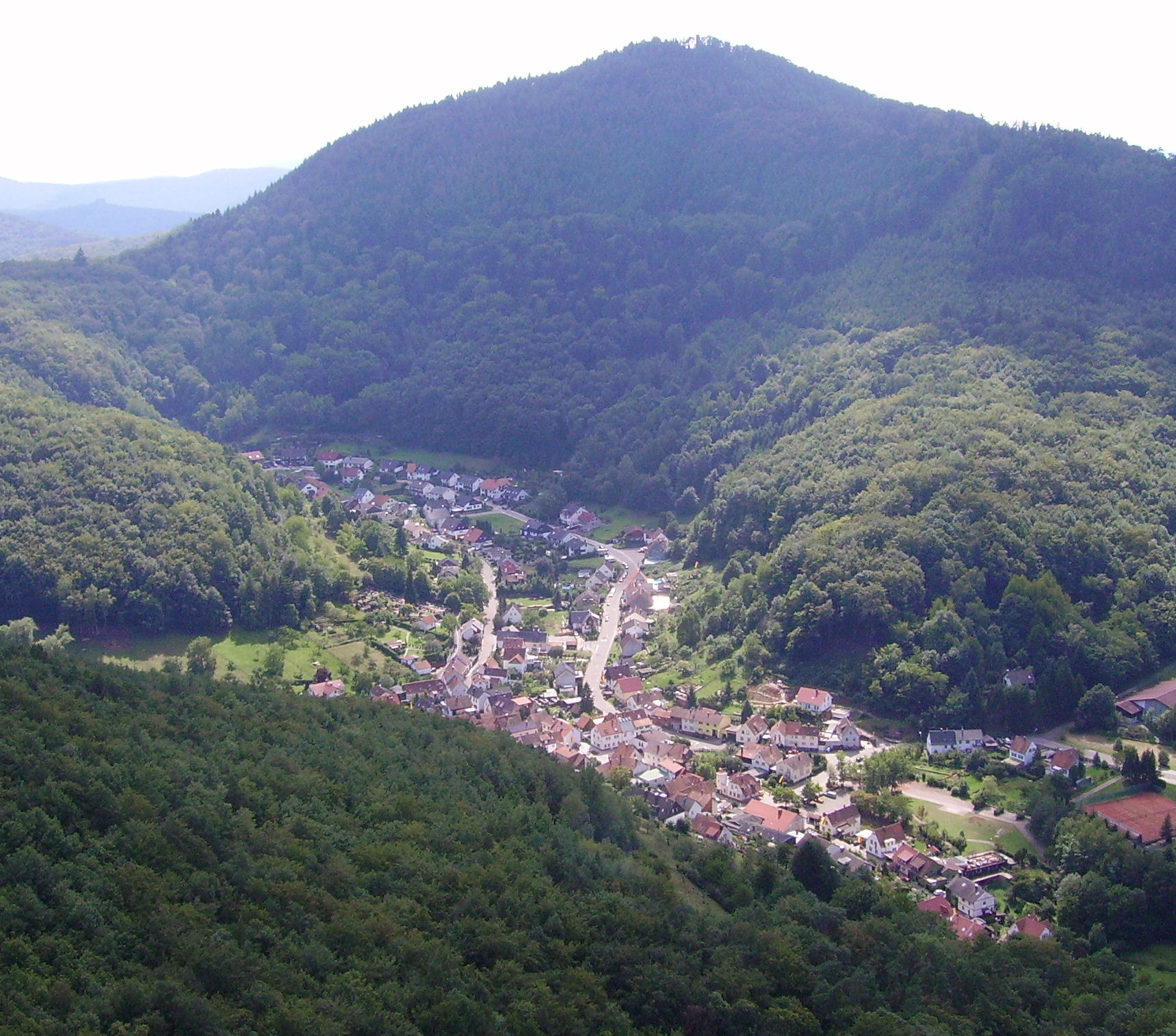
- View from the Trifels over Bindersbach to the Rehberg

Highest point
- Elevation: 576.8 m above sea level (NHN) (1,892 ft)
- Prominence: 320.6 m ↓ Basin northwest of Hauenstein, junction of L 495 with the B 10 (256.2 m)
- Isolation: 7 km → Orensberg (581.2 m)
- Listing: Second highest hill in the Wasgau
- Coordinates: 49°10′54″N 7°58′13″E

Geography
- Location within Rhineland-Palatinate
- Location: near Waldrohrbach; Südliche Weinstraße county, Rhineland-Palatinate (Germany)
- Parent range: Wasgau → Palatine Forest

Geology
- Rock age(s): 251–243 MYA (Bunter sandstone), 256–251 MYA (Zechstein)
- Mountain type: conical hill/ridge
- Rock type(s): Rock units: Bunter sandstone and Zechstein

The Rehberg (German pronunciation: [ˈʁeːˌbɛʁk]) is a prominent hill, 576.8 m above sea level (NHN), in the German state of Rhineland-Palatinate. After the Grand Wintersberg (ca. 581 m) in French North Alsace, the Rehberg is the second highest hill in the Wasgau (French: Vasgovie), the Franco-German region that forms the southern part of the Palatine Forest and runs from the valley of the River Queich to the Col de Saverne . The Rehberg is also the highest hill on German soil in the Wasgau. As part of the Palatine Forest-North Vosges Biosphere Reserve it has been placed under special protection measures.

It lies two kilometres south of the town of Annweiler and has an observation tower at the summit named the Rehberg tower after the hill. The tower offers visitors an unhindered panoramic view over large parts of the Palatine Forest and Upper Rhine Plain as far as the hill chains of the Odenwald, Black Forest and Vosges.

== Literature ==
- Deutscher Wetterdienst, ed. (1957), Klima-Atlas von Rheinland-Pfalz (in German), Bad Kissingen: Verlag Deutscher Wetterdienst, ISBN 3881481354
- Michael Geiger; et al., eds. (1987), Der Pfälzerwald, Porträt einer Landschaft (in German), Landau/Pfalz: Verlag Pfälzische Landeskunde, pp. 21–46, ISBN 3980114716
- Michael Geiger (1990), "Rehberg", in Adolf Hanle (ed.), Pfälzerwald und Weinstraße (in German), Mannheim: Meyers Lexikonverlag, pp. 106–107, ISBN 3411071311
- Michael Geiger (2010), "Die Landschaften der Pfalz", in Michael Geiger; et al. (eds.), Geographie der Pfalz (in German), Landau/Pfalz: Verlag Pfälzische Landeskunde, pp. 98–101, ISBN 9783981297409
- Jost Haneke; Michael Weidenfeller (2010), "Die geologischen Baueinheiten der Pfalz", in Michael Geiger; et al. (eds.), Geographie der Pfalz (in German), Landau/Pfalz: Verlag Pfälzische Landeskunde, pp. 74–91, ISBN 9783981297409
- Adolf Hanle (1990), Meyers Naturführer, Pfälzerwald und Weinstraße (in German), Mannheim: Bibliographisches Institut, pp. 7–12, ISBN 3411071311
- Landesamt für Geologie und Bergbau Rheinland-Pfalz, ed. (2003), Geologische Übersichtskarte von Rheinland-Pfalz 1:300,000 (in German), Mainz
- Edmund Mainberger (1987), "Der Wald", in Michael Geiger; et al. (eds.), Der Pfälzerwald, Porträt einer Landschaft (in German), Landau/Pfalz: Verlag Pfälzische Landeskunde, pp. 101–126, ISBN 3980114716
