= Völkersweiler =

- Municipality
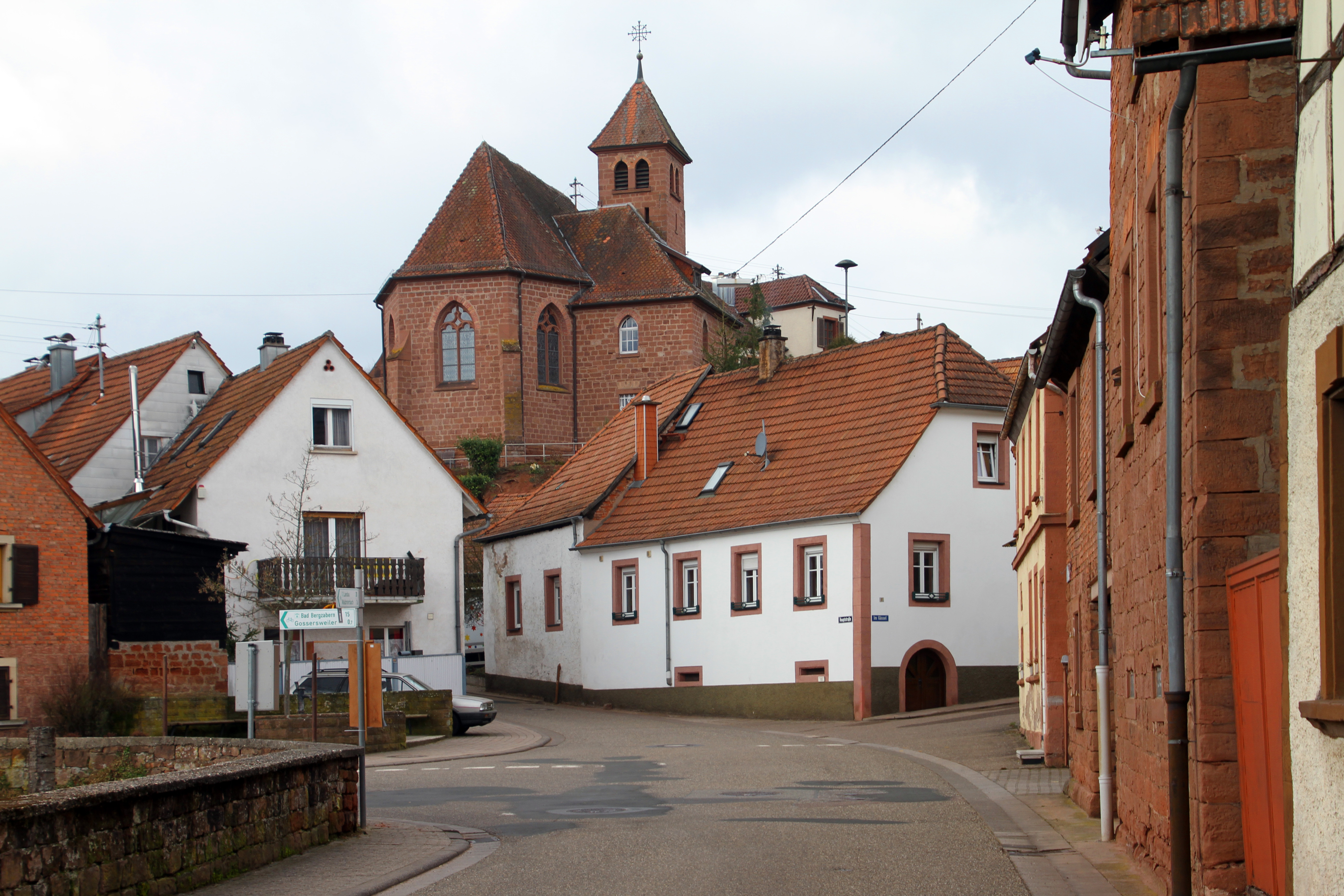

- Coat of arms

- Location of Völkersweiler within Südliche Weinstraße district
- Interactive map of Völkersweiler
- Location within Germany Location within Rhineland-Palatinate
- Coordinates: 49°10′11″N 7°56′04″E
- Country: Germany
- State: Rhineland-Palatinate
- District: Südliche Weinstraße
- Municipal assoc.: Annweiler am Trifels

Government
  - Mayor (2019–24): Gerhard Hammer

Area
  - Total: 4.1 km^{2} (1.6 sq mi)
- Elevation: 280 m (920 ft)

Population (2025-12-31)
  - Total: 571
  - Density: 140/km^{2} (360/sq mi)
- Time zone: UTC+01:00 (CET)
  - Summer (DST): UTC+02:00 (CEST)
- Postal codes: 76857
- Dialling codes: 06346
- Vehicle registration: SÜW
- Website: www.voelkersweiler.de

Völkersweiler (German pronunciation: [ˈfœlkɐsvaɪlɐ]) is a municipality in Südliche Weinstraße district, in Rhineland-Palatinate, western Germany.
