= Northern Vosges =

Mountains in France

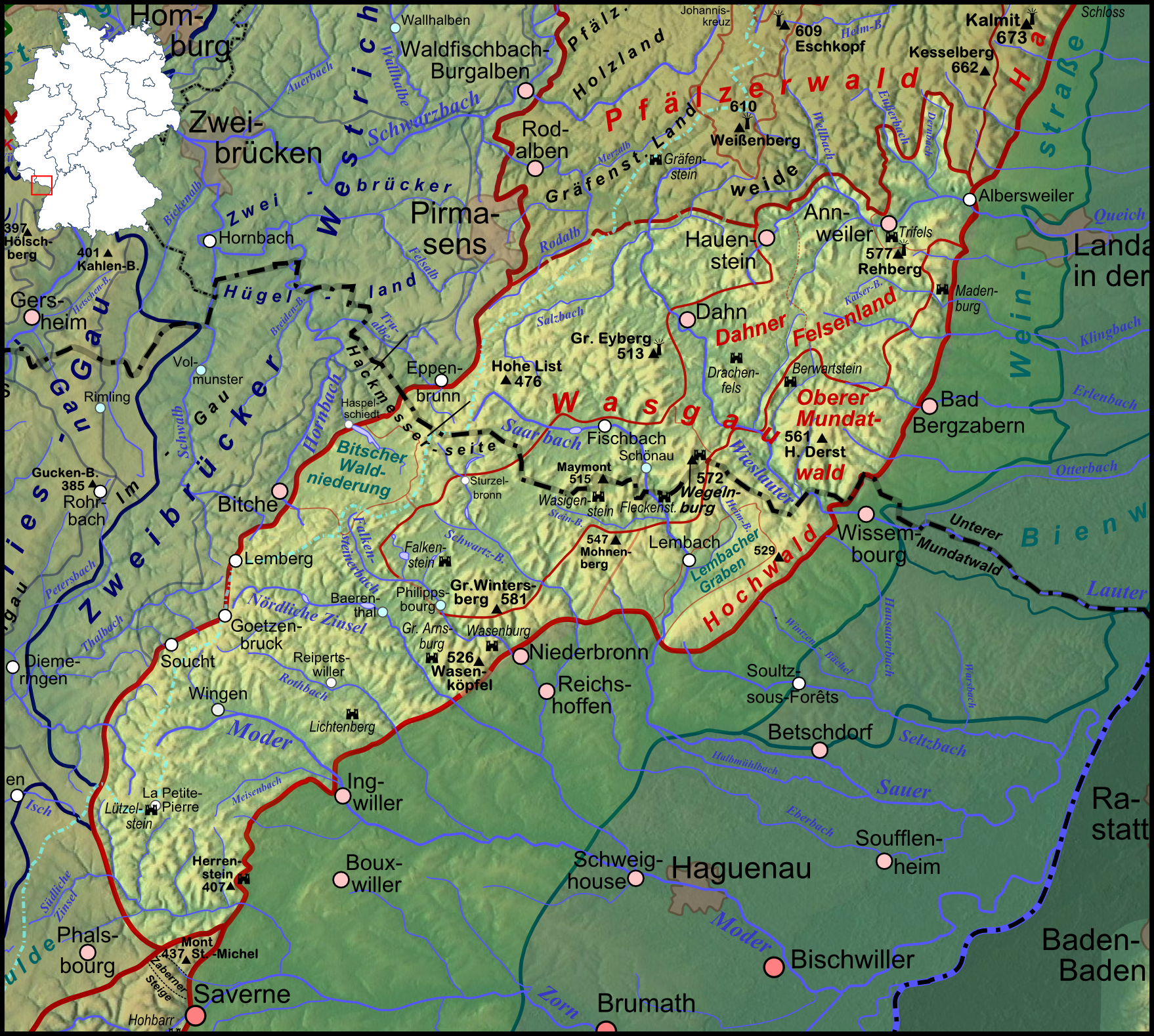
- Location map of Wasgau (the Northern Vosges Mountains correspond to its French part).

Highest point
- Elevation: 581 m (1,906 ft) at Grand Wintersberg

Geography
- Location: Grand Est, France
- Parent range: Palatinate Forest or Vosges

The Northern Vosges, also known as the Lower Sandstone Vosges, are a low mountain range in northeastern France located in the departments of Moselle and Bas-Rhin on the border with Germany.

== Geography ==
=== Situation ===
The Northern Vosges Massif, corresponding to the French part of Wasgau, covers the extreme northeast of Moselle (the East of Pays de Bitche) and the northwest of Bas-Rhin (especially the East of Alsace bossue). It is considered the northernmost part of the Vosges and is located north of the Col de Saverne, which separates it from the Central Vosges. To the north, it is naturally extended beyond the German border by the Palatinate Forest massif. It is bordered to the west by the Lorraine Plateau and to the east by the Alsatian natural regions of Outre-Forêt and Pays de Hanau.

=== Geology ===
The Northern Vosges Massif consists of a monoclinal tilted to the northeast and is mainly composed of Buntsandstein sandstone (colorful sandstone dating from 245 to 230 million years ago). This sandstone is visible on the high points and takes the form of rugged rocks and stacks (a characteristic utilized in the construction of numerous castles in the Middle Ages).

== See also ==
- Northern Vosges Regional Nature Park
- Palatinate Forest
