= Annweiler am Trifels (Verbandsgemeinde) =

Verbandsgemeinde in Rhineland-Palatinate

- Verbandsgemeinde
- Location of Annweiler am Trifels within Südliche Weinstraße district
- Interactive map of Annweiler am Trifels
- Location within Germany Location within Rhineland-Palatinate
- Coordinates: 49°12′N 7°58′E
- Country: Germany
- State: Rhineland-Palatinate
- District: Südliche Weinstraße
- Seat: Annweiler am Trifels
- Subdivisions: 13 municipalities

Area
  - Total: 129.85 km^{2} (50.14 sq mi)

Population (2025-12-31)
  - Total: 16,918
  - Density: 130.29/km^{2} (337.45/sq mi)
- Time zone: UTC+01:00 (CET)
  - Summer (DST): UTC+02:00 (CEST)
- Website: www.vg-annweiler.de

Annweiler am Trifels is a Verbandsgemeinde ("collective municipality") in the Südliche Weinstraße district, in Rhineland-Palatinate, Germany. The seat of the municipality is in Annweiler am Trifels.

The Verbandsgemeinde Annweiler am Trifels consists of the following Ortsgemeinden ("local municipalities"):

1. Albersweiler
2. Annweiler am Trifels
3. Dernbach
4. Eußerthal
5. Gossersweiler-Stein
6. Münchweiler am Klingbach
7. Ramberg
8. Rinnthal
9. Silz
10. Völkersweiler
11. Waldhambach
12. Waldrohrbach
13. Wernersberg
