= Wernersberg =

- Municipality
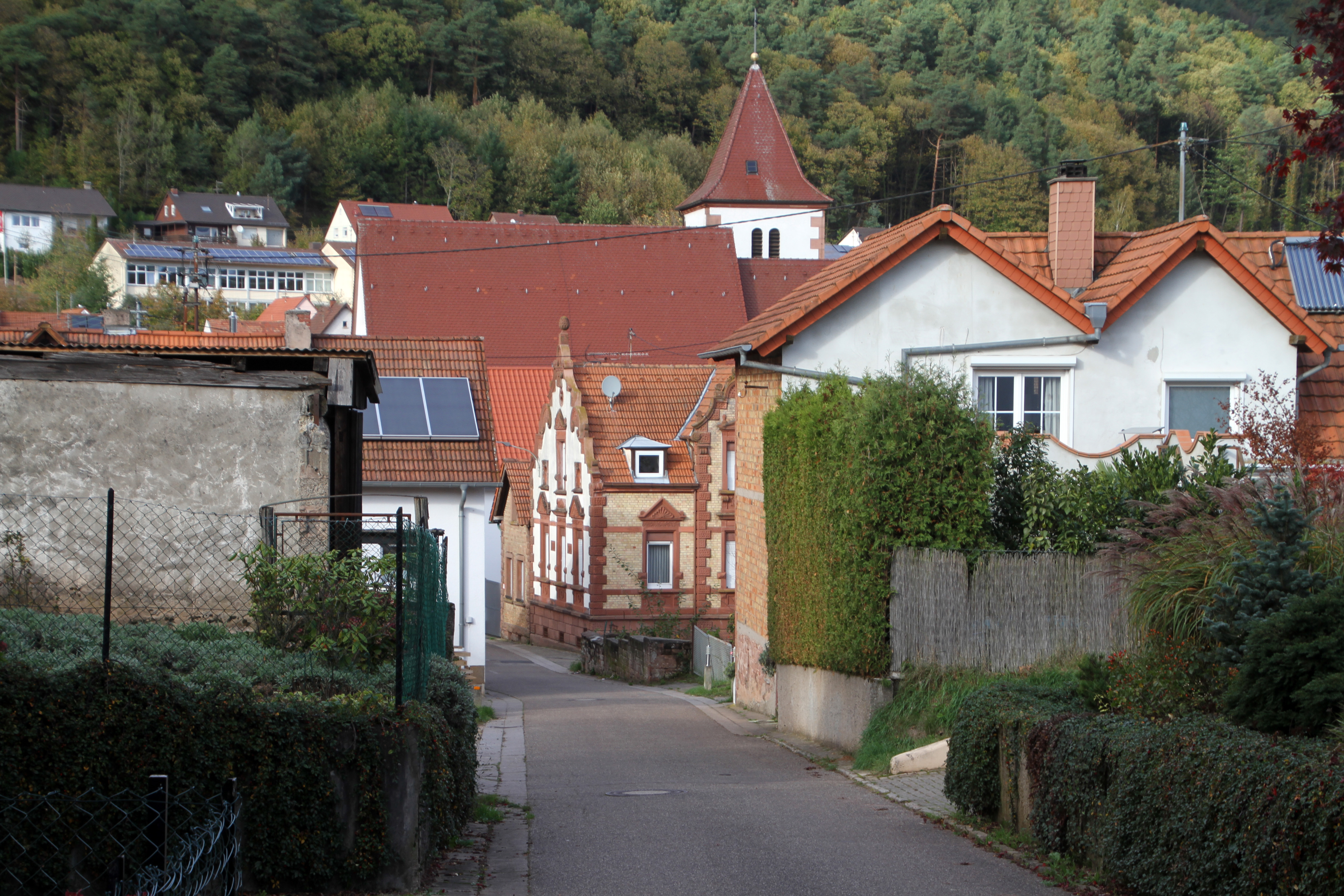

- Coat of arms

- Location of Wernersberg within Südliche Weinstraße district
- Interactive map of Wernersberg
- Location within Germany Location within Rhineland-Palatinate
- Coordinates: 49°11′22″N 7°55′42″E
- Country: Germany
- State: Rhineland-Palatinate
- District: Südliche Weinstraße
- Municipal assoc.: Annweiler am Trifels

Government
  - Mayor (2019–24): Dominik Rubiano Soriano

Area
  - Total: 8.03 km^{2} (3.10 sq mi)
- Elevation: 267 m (876 ft)

Population (2025-12-31)
  - Total: 1,110
  - Density: 138/km^{2} (358/sq mi)
- Time zone: UTC+01:00 (CET)
  - Summer (DST): UTC+02:00 (CEST)
- Postal codes: 76857
- Dialling codes: 06346
- Vehicle registration: SÜW
- Website: www.wernersberg.de

Wernersberg (German pronunciation: [ˈvɛʁnɐsbɛʁk]) is a municipality in Südliche Weinstraße district, in Rhineland-Palatinate, western Germany.
