= Albersweiler =

- Municipality
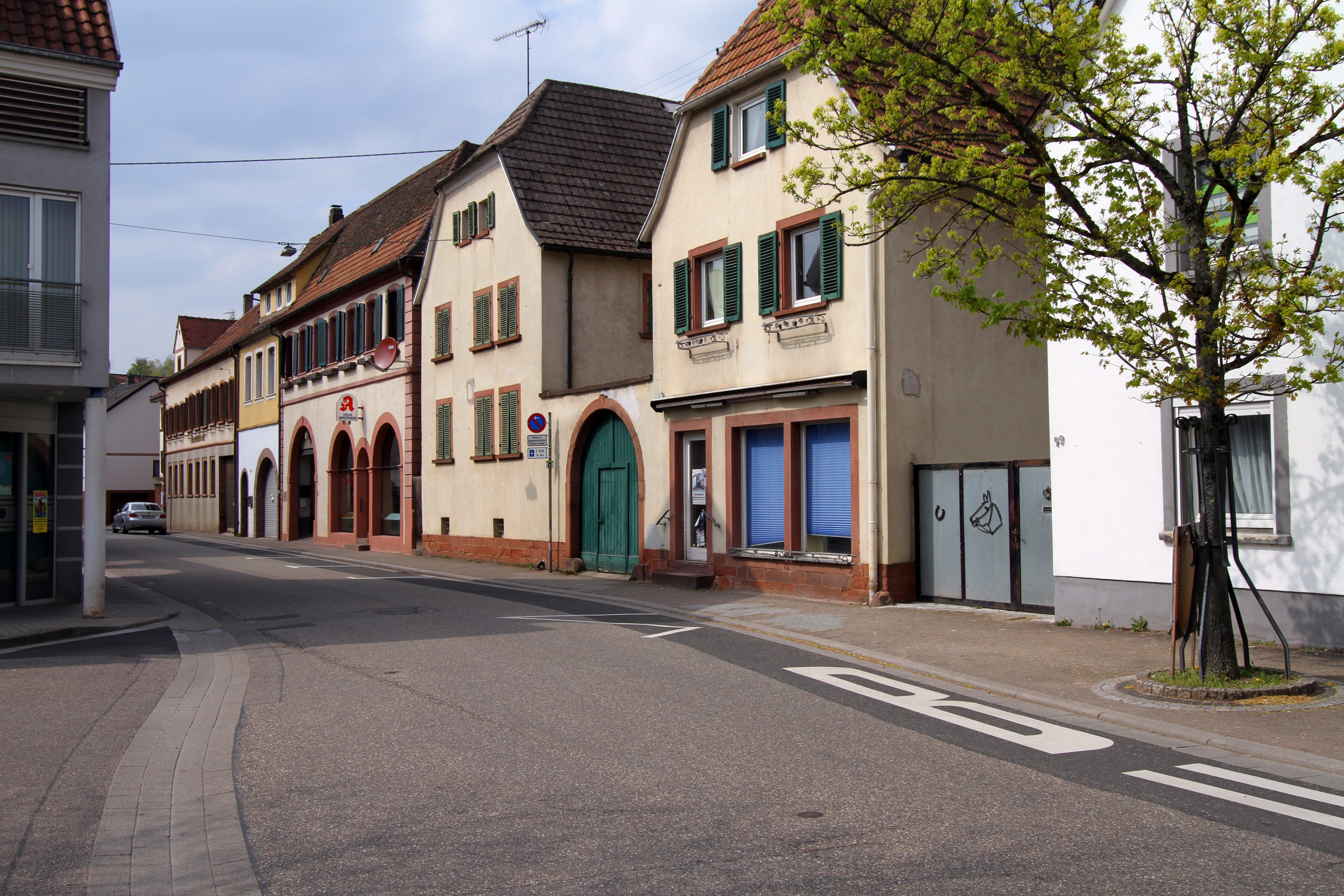

- Coat of arms

- Location of Albersweiler within Südliche Weinstraße district
- Interactive map of Albersweiler
- Location within Germany Location within Rhineland-Palatinate
- Coordinates: 49°13′N 8°2′E
- Country: Germany
- State: Rhineland-Palatinate
- District: Südliche Weinstraße
- Municipal assoc.: Annweiler am Trifels

Government
  - Mayor (2019–24): Ernst Spieß (SPD)

Area
  - Total: 10.85 km^{2} (4.19 sq mi)
- Elevation: 165 m (541 ft)

Population (2025-12-31)
  - Total: 1,959
  - Density: 180.6/km^{2} (467.6/sq mi)
- Time zone: UTC+01:00 (CET)
  - Summer (DST): UTC+02:00 (CEST)
- Postal codes: 76857
- Dialling codes: 06345
- Vehicle registration: SÜW
- Website: www.albersweiler.de

Albersweiler is a municipality in the Südliche Weinstraße ("Southern Wine Road") district, in Rhineland-Palatinate, Germany. It is part of the Verbandsgemeinde Annweiler am Trifels.

== History ==
=== Middle Ages ===
The village was first mentioned in 1065. Samuel, abbot of the Weissenburg Monastery in Alsace endowed the altars of the Redeemer and the Mother of God; one was in Adelbresddeswilare of Albratheswilre. In 985, Duke Otto I took possession of Albersweiler and 67 other locations from the Weissenburgers, as a part of the "Salian Church Robbery." By 1219, the hamlet was controlled by Annweiler. by 1274, the town of Landau had taken control, and was using Albersweiler as a quarry.

By the fifteenth century, Albersweiler had been divided between two different lords, and the main street of the village formed a state border: the southern section became a part of the Duchy of Palatine Zweibrücken, and the northern part belonged to Geschlecht von Scharfenberg.

=== Early Modern ===
During the Reformation, the boundary also became denominational: the northern part of Albersweiler was Roman Catholic, and the southern part Protestant. During the Thirty Years War, Catholic troops burned down the Protestant south in 1622. Twelve years later, Protestant Swedes destroyed the northern part of the town, controlled by a Catholic branch of the Löwenstein-Scharfeneck family.

After the Peace of Westphalia, the town was plagued by the plague. The village began to grow again after the War of Spanish Succession. In 1736, the foundation was laid for the Lutheran Church Building.

After the French Revolution in 1794, the French occupied Albersweiler, placing it in the Zweibrücken Arrondissement in the department of Donnersbergkreis (Mount Thunder). After the Congress of Vienna, the Palatinate was transferred from France to Bavaria; Albersweiler belonged to the Canton Annweiler in Bezirksamt Bergzabern until the end of 1946.

=== Since the Nineteenth Century ===
During the Nineteenth century, Albersweiler was a farming village, with most residents involved in wine production. In 1832, the people of the hamlet built a Catholic school and began to build a Protestant school. The Catholic parish of St. Stephen was built starting in 1843. The Lutheran church was built in 1846. Both buildings were designed by the famous Bavarian architect August von Voit. The Jewish community built a synagogue in 1865, which was destroyed in 1938.

Toward the end of the nineteenth century, the granite quarry on the western edge of Albersweier grew as an industrial location, with a porcelain factory, a glove factory, a shoe factory, a "sulfur kitchen" (schwefelküche) and a match factory. In 1925, the installation of the local power grid was completed.

During the Second World War, the stationing of weapons in a tunnel resulted in repeated bombings by allied aircraft. In the postwar years, the damage was repaired. In 1954–1955, the community built a canal, and new areas were opened for residential building. In 1984, a new bypass was opened to relieve the city of the burden of heavy through-traffic. In 1972, Albersweiler became a part of the local municipality of Annweiler on Trifels. Since 1969, it has belonged to the Landkreis (district) of Landau-Bad Bergzabern, which was renamed in 1978 to Südliche Weinstrasse.

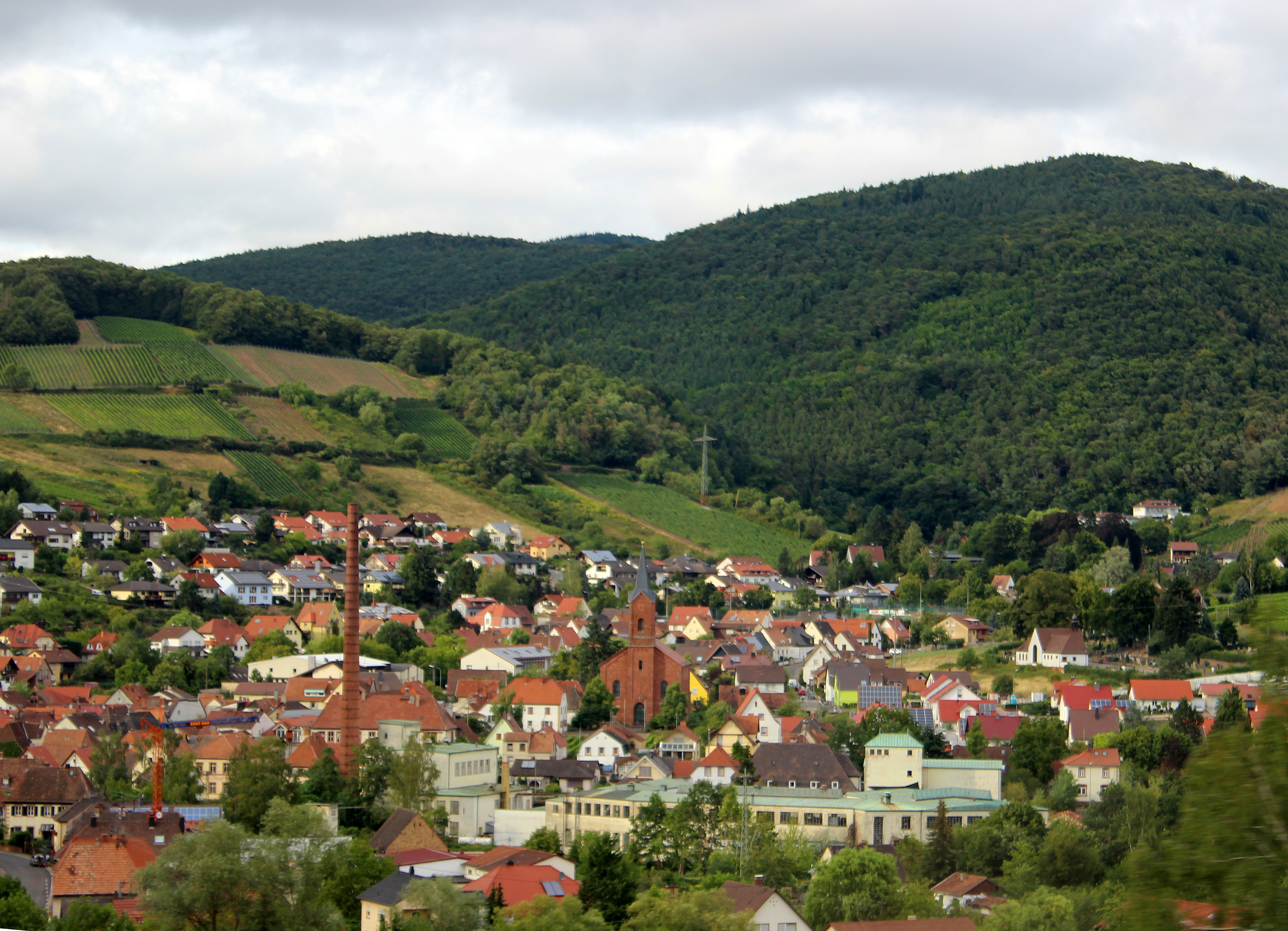
View of Albersweiler

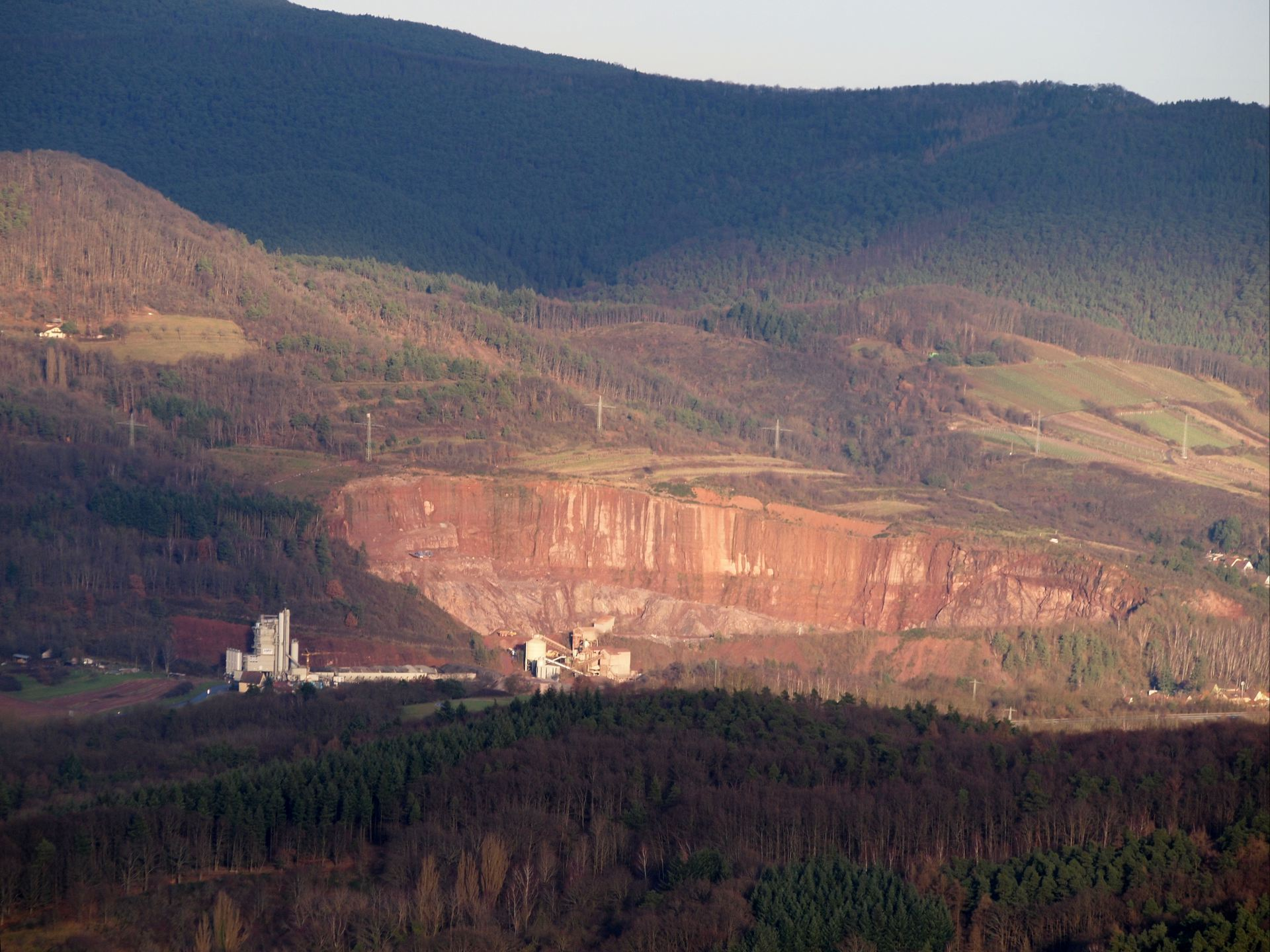
Gneiss quarry

== Mayor ==
Since 1994: Ernst Spieß (SPD)
