= Gossersweiler-Stein =

- Municipality
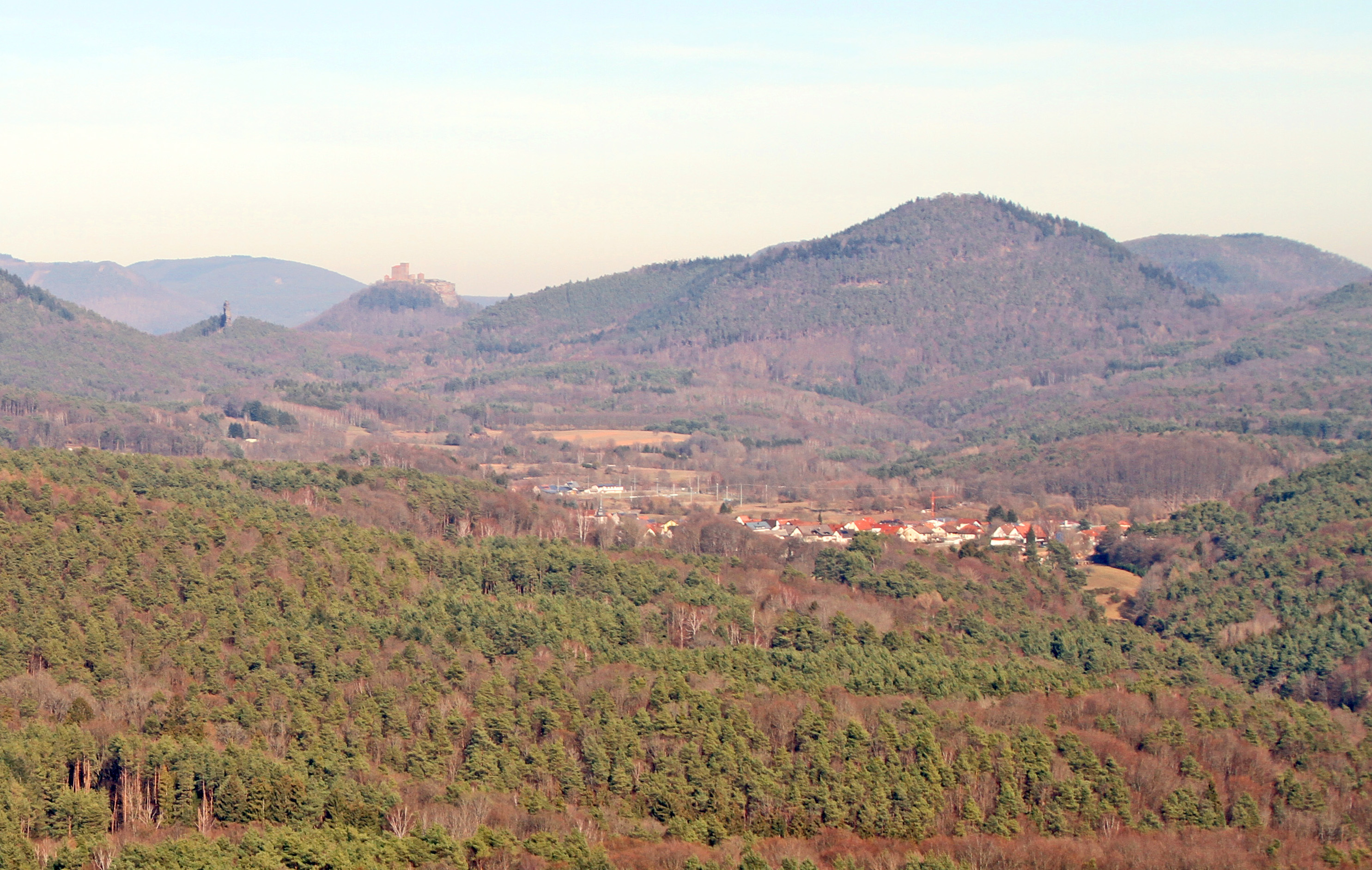

- Coat of arms

- Location of Gossersweiler-Stein within Südliche Weinstraße district
- Interactive map of Gossersweiler-Stein
- Location within Germany Location within Rhineland-Palatinate
- Coordinates: 49°09′36″N 7°55′50″E
- Country: Germany
- State: Rhineland-Palatinate
- District: Südliche Weinstraße
- Municipal assoc.: Annweiler am Trifels
- Subdivisions: 2

Government
  - Mayor (2019–24): Pascal Braun

Area
  - Total: 8.60 km^{2} (3.32 sq mi)
- Elevation: 285 m (935 ft)

Population (2025-12-31)
  - Total: 1,382
  - Density: 161/km^{2} (416/sq mi)
- Time zone: UTC+01:00 (CET)
  - Summer (DST): UTC+02:00 (CEST)
- Postal codes: 76857
- Dialling codes: 06346
- Vehicle registration: SÜW
- Website: www.gossersweiler-stein.de

Gossersweiler-Stein is a municipality in Südliche Weinstraße district, in Rhineland-Palatinate, western Germany.

== Geography ==
The municipality lies in the Wasgau region, which comprises the southern part of Pfälzerwald and the northern part of Vosges, in the centre of the Gossersweilerer valley. It consists of the two districts Gossersweiler and Stein.

== History ==
On March 1, 1970, the only independent municipalities of Gossersweiler and Stein were brought together to form a new municipality of Gossersweiler-Stein. Two years later the latter became part of the Verbandsgemeinde Annweiler am Trifels.

=== Population Development ===
The development of the population based on the present municipal area of Gossersweiler-Stein; The values from 1871 to 1987 are based on censuses:

Year	Population
1815	876
1835	1.037
1871	993
1905	929
1939	1.116
1950	1.108

Year	Population
1961	1.189
1970	1.276
1987	1.308
1997	1.445
2005	1.472
2025	1382

== Politics ==
=== Town Council ===
The municipal council in Gossersweiler-Stein consists of 16 councillors, who were elected in the municipal elections on 25 May 2014 in a personalised proportional election, with the honorary local mayor as chairman.

=== Community Partnerships ===
Since November 1984, a partnership has been established with the French community of Schoenenbourg.

== Economy and Infrastructure ==
=== Facilities ===
On the eastern outskirts of Gossersweiler is a commercial area. At the foot of the Engelsmannfelsen, the Gossersweiler-Stein primary school, the Berglandhalle and the local volunteer fire brigade are located just outside the settlement areas of the two districts. The school has around 180 pupils and its catchment area includes the neighbouring municipalities Völkersweiler, Waldrohrbach, Waldhambach, Silz and Münchweiler. There are a total of 24 clubs, including several sports clubs such as SV Gossersweiler-Stein and Gossersweiler Valley.

=== Tourism ===
Gossersweiler-Stein is a possible starting point for hikes and mountain bike tours in the Pfälzerwald. Four kilometers away are the castle ruins of Lindelbrunn, as well as the ruins Landeck and the Trifels. With the connection to the regional cycling route, day trips to the Southern Wine Route, Alsace or the Dahner Rockland are possible. Other places of interest are the Schuhdorf Hauenstein and the Biosphärenhaus near Fischbach.

=== Media ===
Every Month, as so-called "village newspaper" is produced.

=== Traffic ===
The nearest train station is Annweiler am Trifels

== Personalities ==
- Philip Hammer (1837–1901) - A Catholic Priest, pre-regional preacher and popular speaker
