= Waldrohrbach =

- Municipality
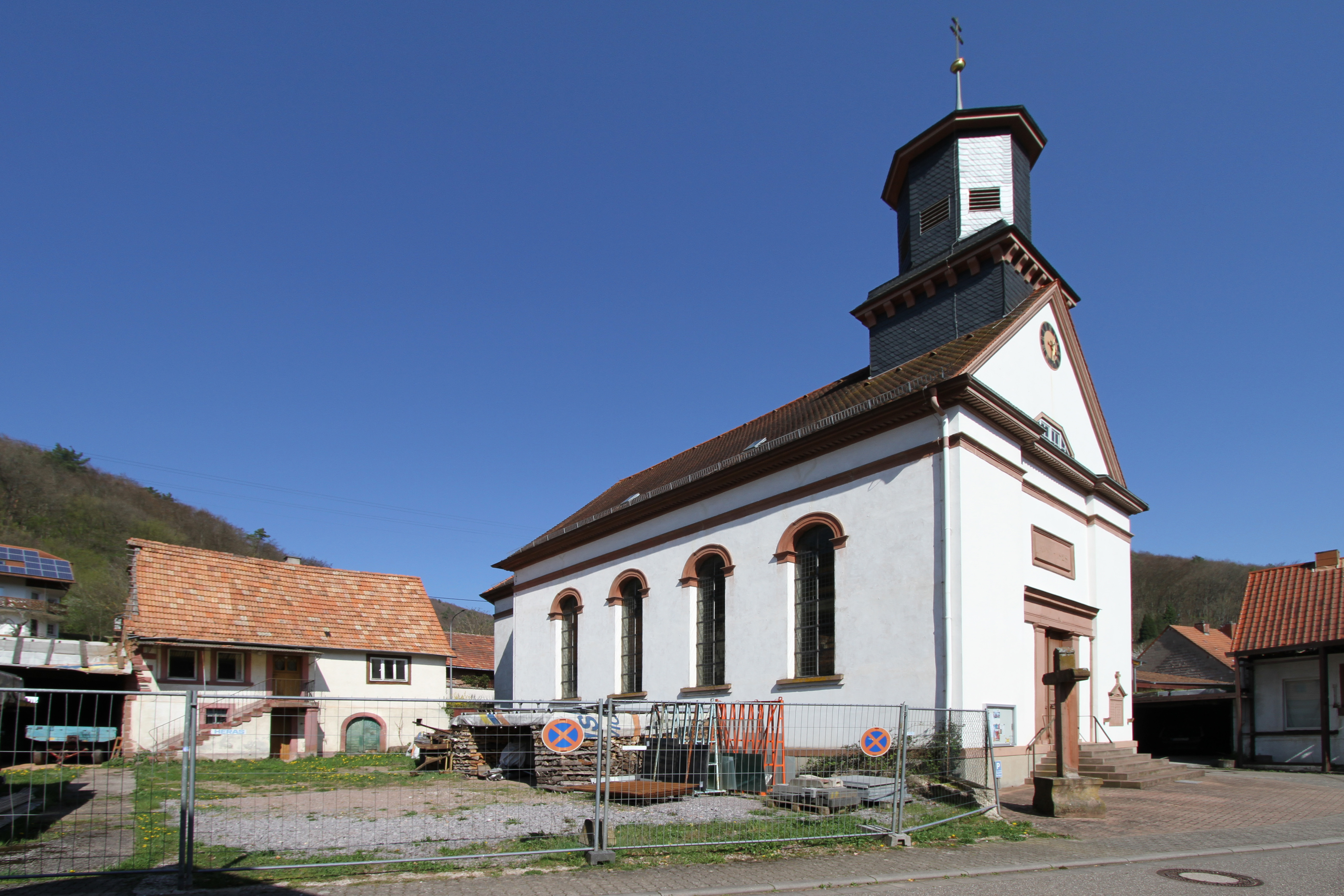
- St. Ägidius

- Coat of arms

- Location of Waldrohrbach within Südliche Weinstraße district
- Interactive map of Waldrohrbach
- Location within Germany Location within Rhineland-Palatinate
- Coordinates: 49°10′16″N 7°58′07″E
- Country: Germany
- State: Rhineland-Palatinate
- District: Südliche Weinstraße
- Municipal assoc.: Annweiler am Trifels

Government
  - Mayor (2019–24): Thomas Wick

Area
  - Total: 5.90 km^{2} (2.28 sq mi)
- Elevation: 241 m (791 ft)

Population (2025-12-31)
  - Total: 406
  - Density: 68.8/km^{2} (178/sq mi)
- Time zone: UTC+01:00 (CET)
  - Summer (DST): UTC+02:00 (CEST)
- Postal codes: 76857
- Dialling codes: 06346
- Vehicle registration: SÜW
- Website: www.waldrohrbach.de

Waldrohrbach is a municipality in Südliche Weinstraße district, in Rhineland-Palatinate, western Germany.
