= Eußerthal =

- Municipality
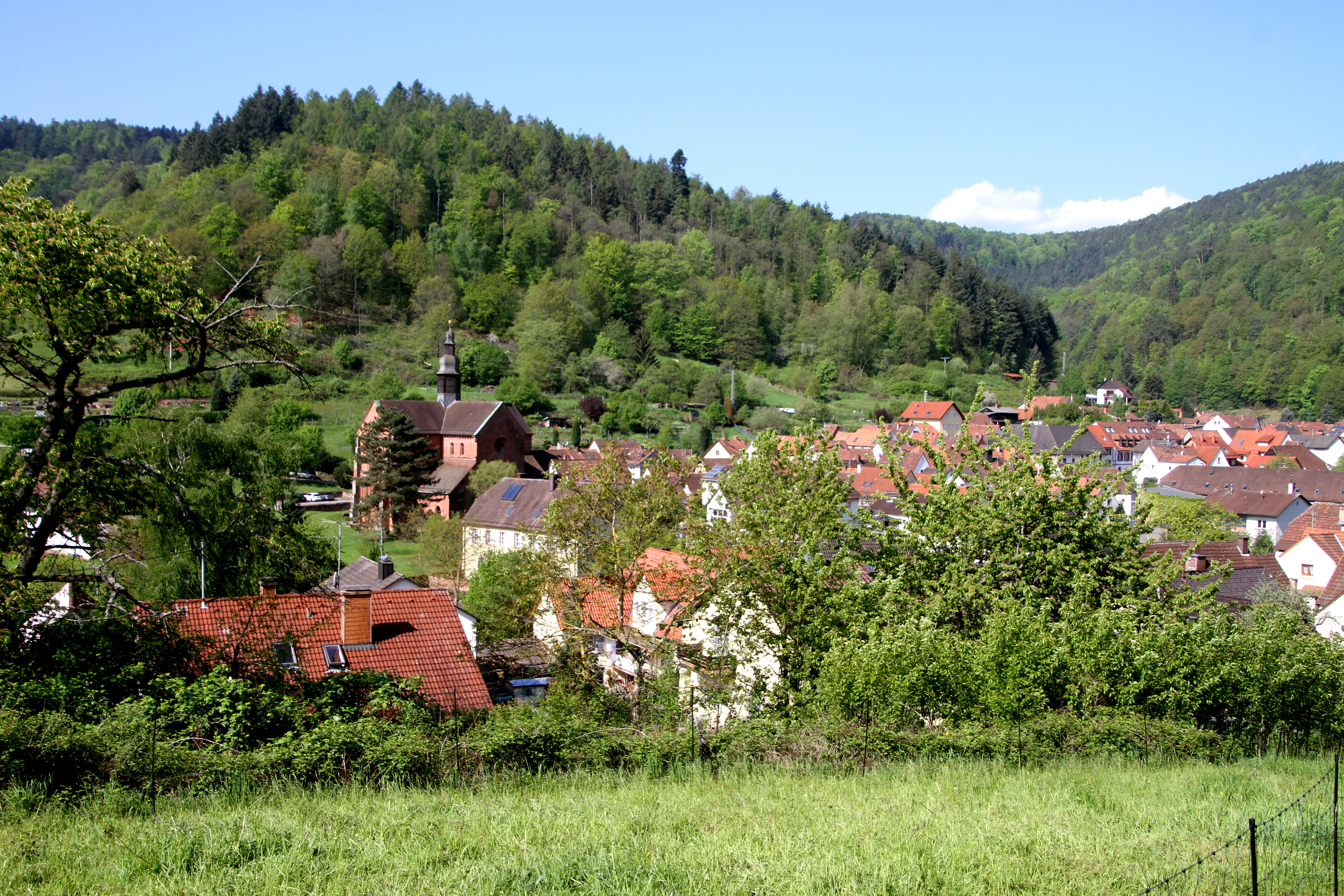

- Location of Eußerthal within Südliche Weinstraße district
- Interactive map of Eußerthal
- Location within Germany Location within Rhineland-Palatinate
- Coordinates: 49°14′38″N 07°58′11″E
- Country: Germany
- State: Rhineland-Palatinate
- District: Südliche Weinstraße
- Municipal assoc.: Annweiler am Trifels

Government
  - Mayor (2019–24): Reinhard Denny

Area
  - Total: 12.51 km^{2} (4.83 sq mi)
- Elevation: 195 m (640 ft)

Population (2025-12-31)
  - Total: 914
  - Density: 73.1/km^{2} (189/sq mi)
- Time zone: UTC+01:00 (CET)
  - Summer (DST): UTC+02:00 (CEST)
- Postal codes: 76857
- Dialling codes: 06345
- Vehicle registration: SÜW
- Website: www.eusserthal.de

Eußerthal (German pronunciation: [ˈɔʏsɐtaːl]) is a municipality in the Südliche Weinstraße district of Rhineland-Palatinate, Germany.
