= Asselstein =

Rock pinnicle in Germany

Coordinates: 49°11′17″N 7°57′36″E

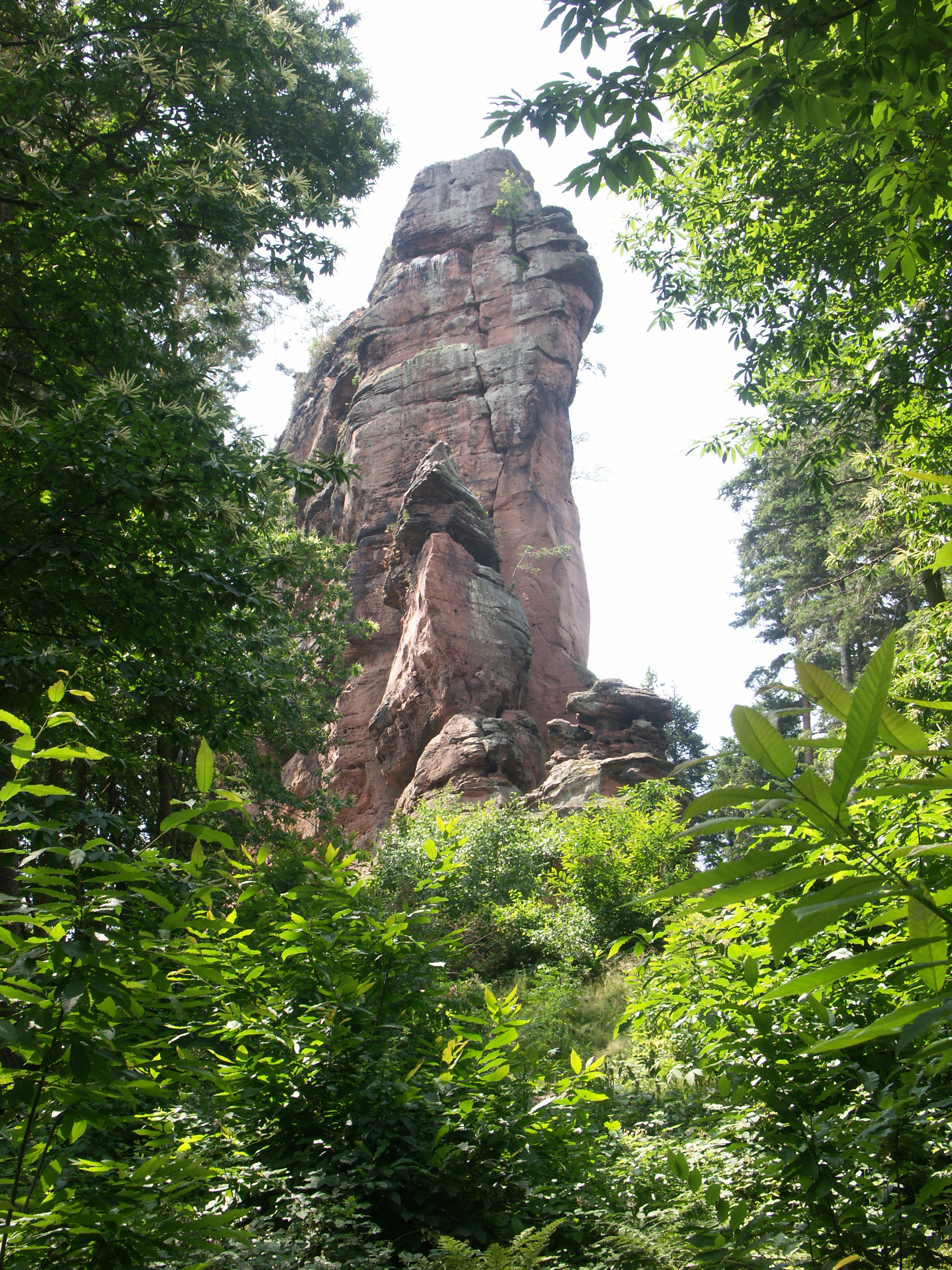
The Asselstein

The Asselstein is a rock pinnacle or tower near the village of Annweiler am Trifels in the Southern Palatinate in western Germany.

The road from Annweiler to Trifels runs close by the Asselstein. Not far east of the rock is the Asselstein Climbing Hut.

The roughly 60 metre tall and over 10 metre wide rock tower is 58 metres high at its highest point and consists of rocks from the Lower Bunter Sandstone (Trifels beds). The Asselstein was first climbed in June 1860. With almost 80 routes, e. g. Normalweg IV−, Westwand V−, Rolfkamin VI- and Ostwand V (UIAA climbing grades) it is one of the major climbing destinations in the South Palatinate Climbing Area. The most difficult route is UIAA grade 9+.
