= Waldhambach, Rhineland-Palatinate =

Waldhambach
- Municipality
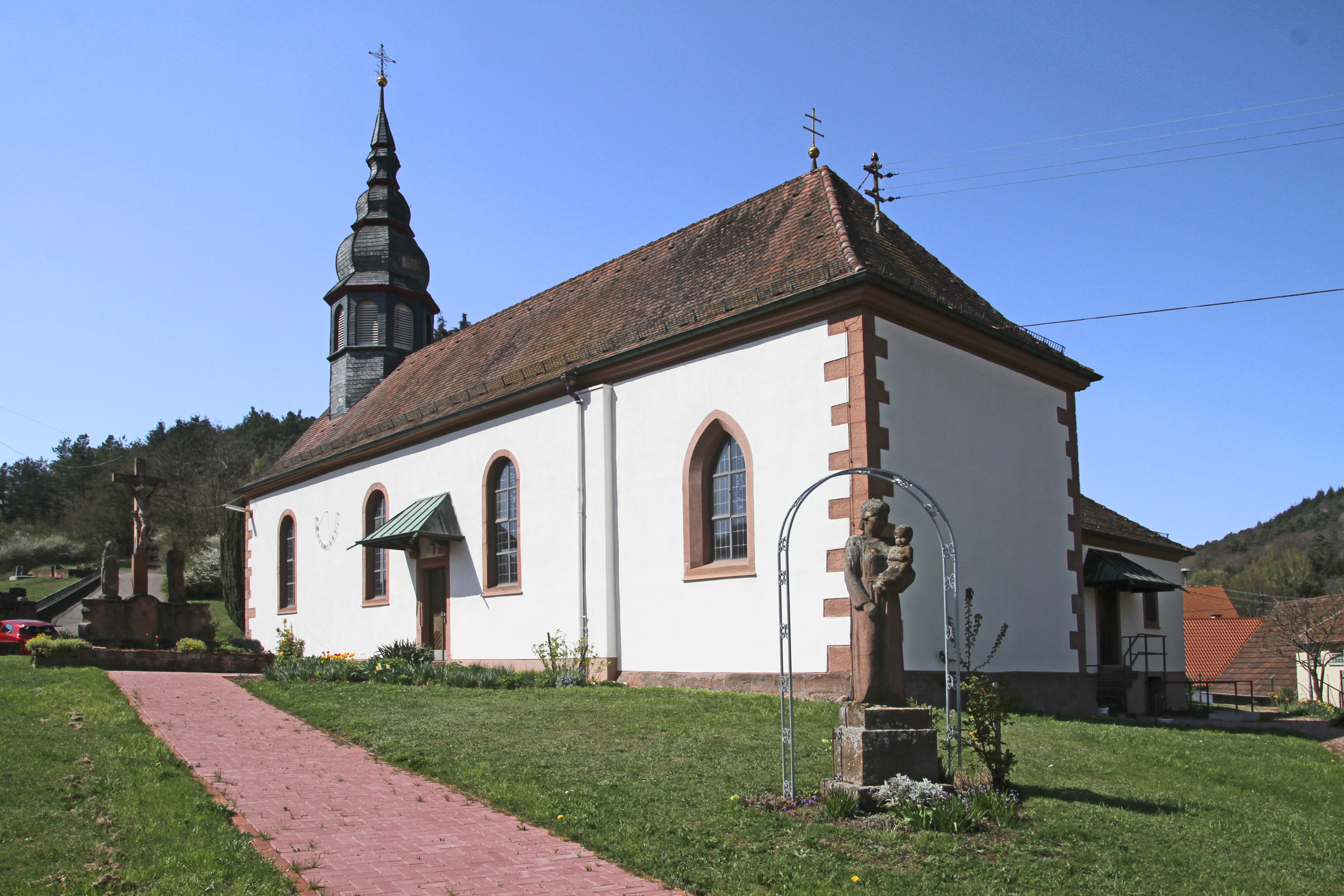
- St. Wendelin

- Coat of arms

- Location of Waldhambach within Südliche Weinstraße district
- Interactive map of Waldhambach
- Location within Germany Location within Rhineland-Palatinate
- Coordinates: 49°10′00″N 7°59′26″E
- Country: Germany
- State: Rhineland-Palatinate
- District: Südliche Weinstraße
- Municipal assoc.: Annweiler am Trifels

Government
  - Mayor (2023–24): Peter Fischer (CDU)

Area
  - Total: 3.92 km^{2} (1.51 sq mi)
- Elevation: 230 m (750 ft)

Population (2025-12-31)
  - Total: 382
  - Density: 97.4/km^{2} (252/sq mi)
- Time zone: UTC+01:00 (CET)
  - Summer (DST): UTC+02:00 (CEST)
- Postal codes: 76857
- Dialling codes: 06346
- Vehicle registration: SÜW
- Website: www.vg-annweiler.de

Waldhambach is a municipality in Südliche Weinstraße district, in Rhineland-Palatinate, western Germany.
