= Incised valleys =

Type of valley

Incised valleys are mountain-valley-like features that commonly result from river down cutting into coastal plains and continental shelves in response to marine regression. They are the key evidence to identify sequence boundary on seismic profiles and outcrops. The magnitudes of their down cutting have been used to estimate the global sea-level variations.

== Geological definition ==
In contrast to mountain valleys, which owe their topography to structural movements, the formation of incised valleys is primarily in response to erosional base level drops during sea-level falls. Since sea-level fluctuations are most manifested in coastal areas, they are prominent in shallow water environments, where prior depositional surfaces are subject to subaerial erosion and fluvial systems continue carving downward. As sea-level rises, the incised valleys are drowned and filled with non-marine though estuary to open marine sediments. Subsequently, the term of incised valley has been extensively used to describe outcrops.

== Global distribution ==
Ancient channelized features in outcrops have long been reported in literature, but their significances in eustatic sea-level variation and chronostratigraphy have not been recognized until Vail et al (1977) put them in the context of sequence stratigraphy through seismic stratigraphy. With the development of offshore petroleum exploration, incised valleys have been widely identified on multi-channel seismic data coverage on continental shelves. Quaternary incised valleys, in particular, have been reported worldwide. Because of extensive seismic data coverage on the continental shelf, most recent rivers along the US Gulf Coast have been recognized with their own incised valley extending to the continental shelf break.

== Depth dimension ==
Based on the estimation of continental ice volume, eustatic sea-level variations are calculated in the range of 200 meters. This is consistent with the observed depth magnitudes of Quaternary incised valleys. In northern Libya, a Late Miocene incised valley has been mapped with 150 kilometer length and at least 700 meter depth, far exceeding the Quaternary eustatic sea-level variations. It turns out that during the Late Miocene, the Mediterranean Sea was blocked from the Atlantic at Gibraltar Strait and the Mediterranean became a deep but shallow water basin by evaporation. This caused a regional erosional base level dropped more than 1000 meters. This is the well known geological event called the Messinian salinity crisis.
