= Grand Wintersberg =

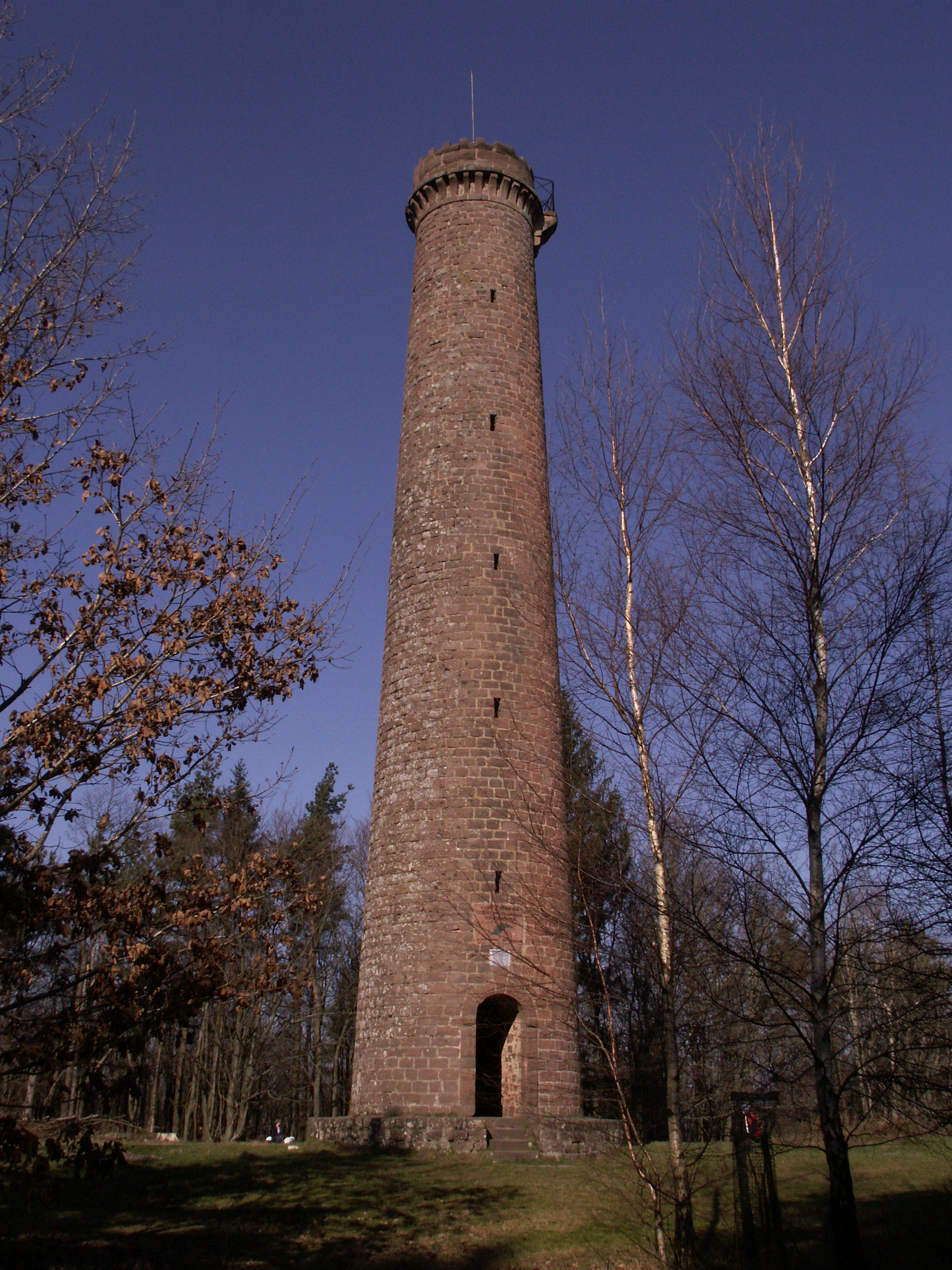
- The observation tower

Highest point
- Elevation: 581 m (1,906 ft)
- Coordinates: 48°58′43″N 7°36′53″E

Geography
- Location within France
- Location: Alsace, France
- Parent range: Vosges

Geology
- Mountain type: Bunter Sandstone

At 581 m, the Grand Wintersberg (German: Großer Wintersberg) is the highest hill in the North Vosges in Alsace, France.

The Grand Wintersberg lies about four kilometres northwest of Niederbronn-les-Bains. The massif separates the valleys of the Falkensteinerbach and the Schwarzbach. At its summit, which is made of Bunter Sandstone, stands a 25-metre-high observation tower, which offer hikers an outstanding panoramic view over the North Vosges, the Palatine Forest and the Upper Rhine Plain across to the Black Forest.

At the 514-metre-high saddle between Grand and Petit Wintersberg (Col de la Liese) is a hut, the Chalet du Wintersberg, managed by the Vosges Club, as well as the Liese, a Gallo-Roman, sphinx-like sandstone relief. Celtic relicts may also be found on the hill of Ziegenberg to the southeast.
