= Klingbach =

River in Germany

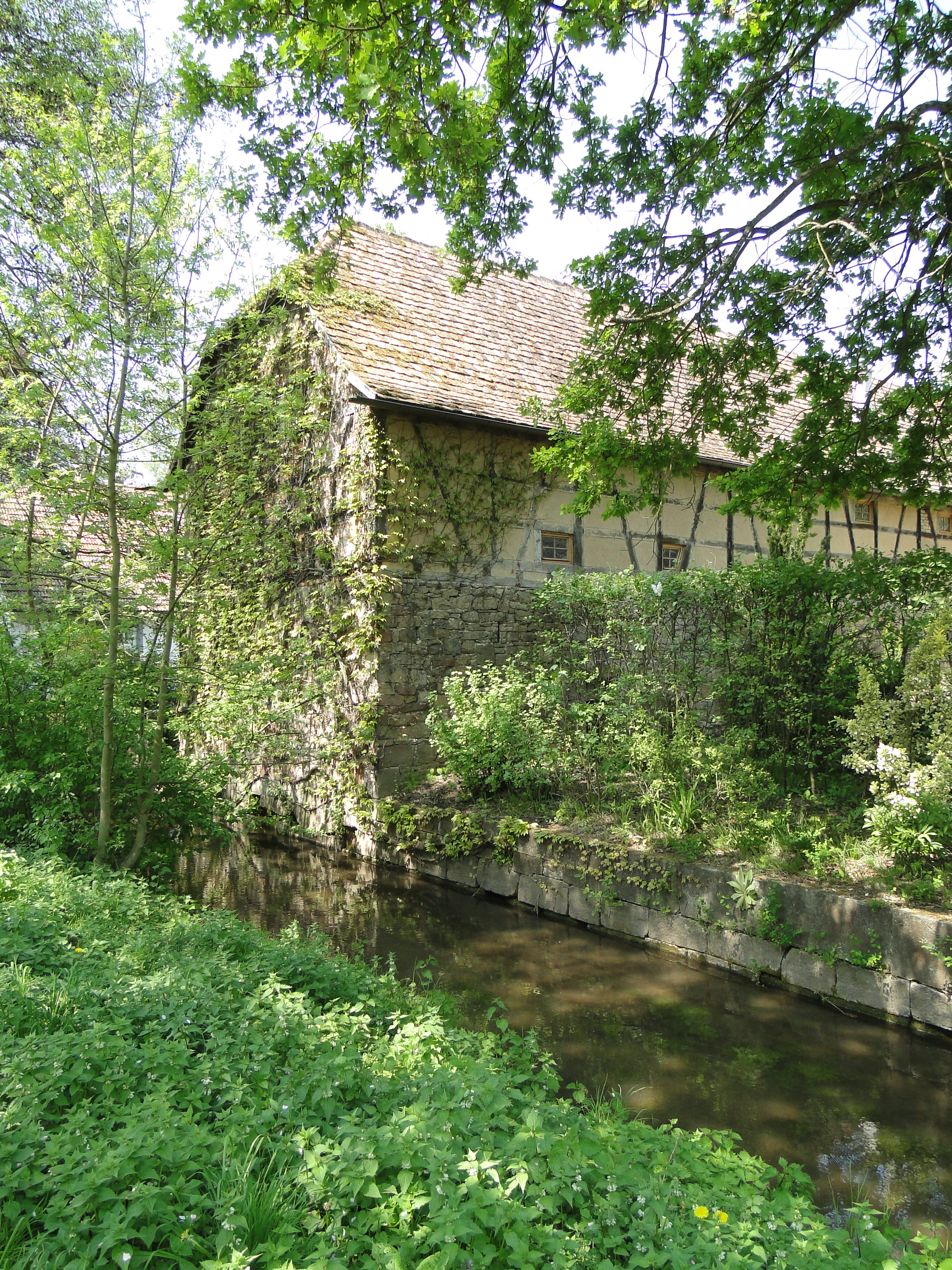
- The Klingbach at the Old Mill in Herxheim

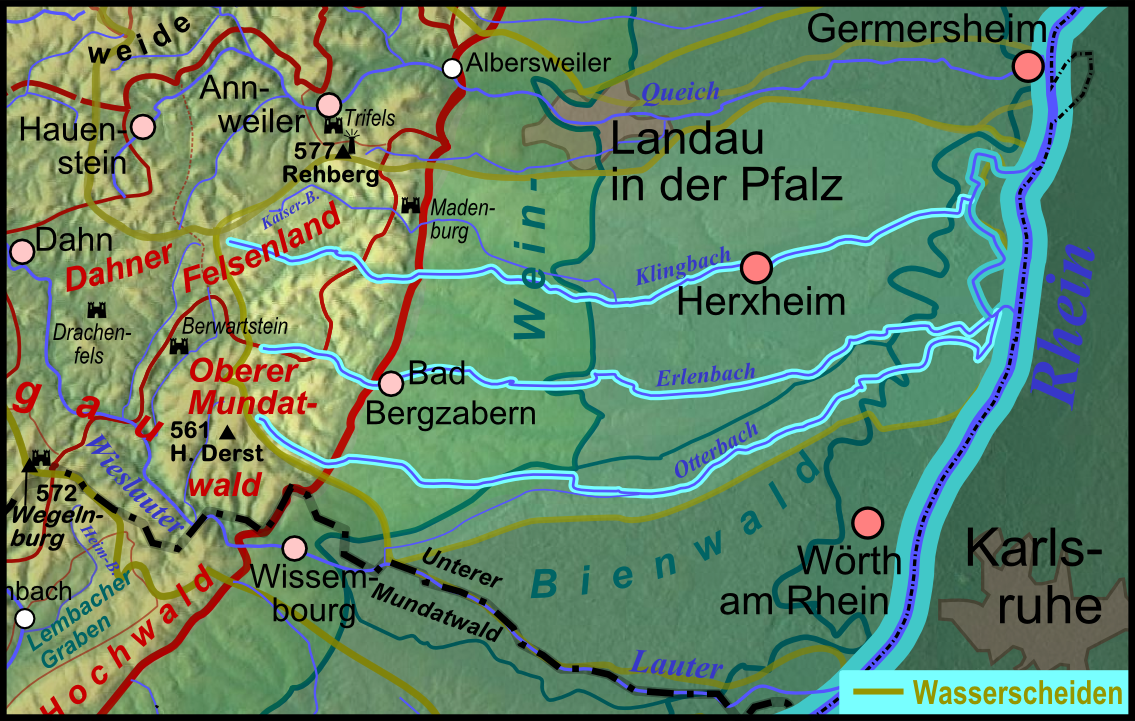
- Course of the Klingbach (top)

Location
- Location: Germany Rhineland-Palatinate South Palatinate
- Reference no.: DE: 237546

Physical characteristics
- Source
  - location: near Lindelbrunn Castle
  - coordinates: 49°09′07″N 7°54′21″E
  - elevation: 350 m above sea level (NHN)
- Mouth
  - location: at Hördt from the left into the Michelsbach
  - coordinates: 49°10′43″N 8°20′23″E
  - elevation: 99 m above sea level (NHN)
- Length: 37.84 km
- Basin size: 130.241 km^{2}

Basin features
- Progression: Michelsbach → Rhine → North Sea
- River system: Rhine
- Tributaries
  - left: Silzer Bach, Kaiserbach, Quodbach
  - right: Sandwiesenbach
- Waterbodies: Reservoirs: Silzer See

The Klingbach (German pronunciation: [ˈklɪŋbax]) is a stream, just under 38 kilometres (24 mi) long, in South Palatinate, Germany, and a left-hand tributary of the Michelsbach.

== Geography ==
=== Course ===
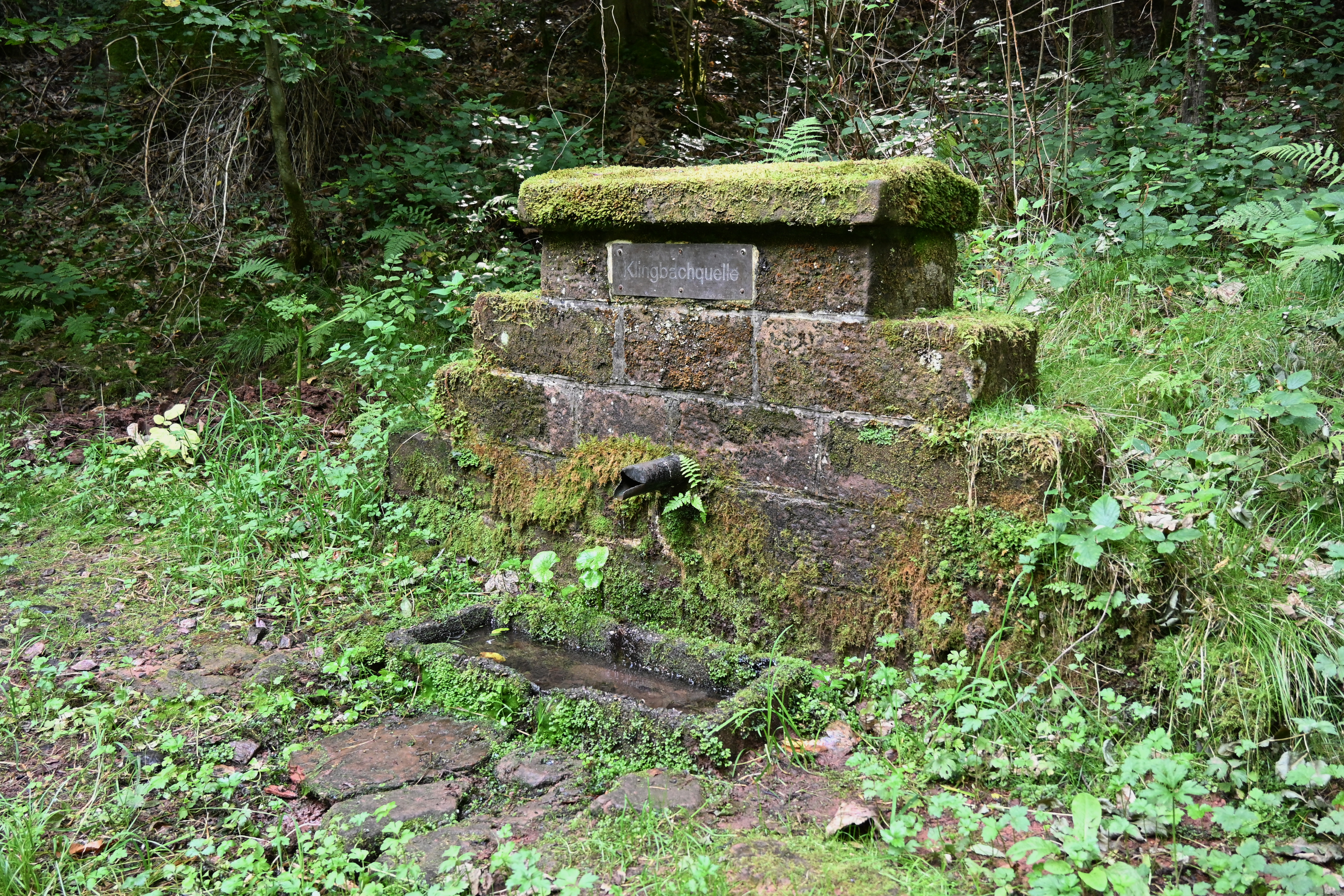
The main source, Klingbachquelle

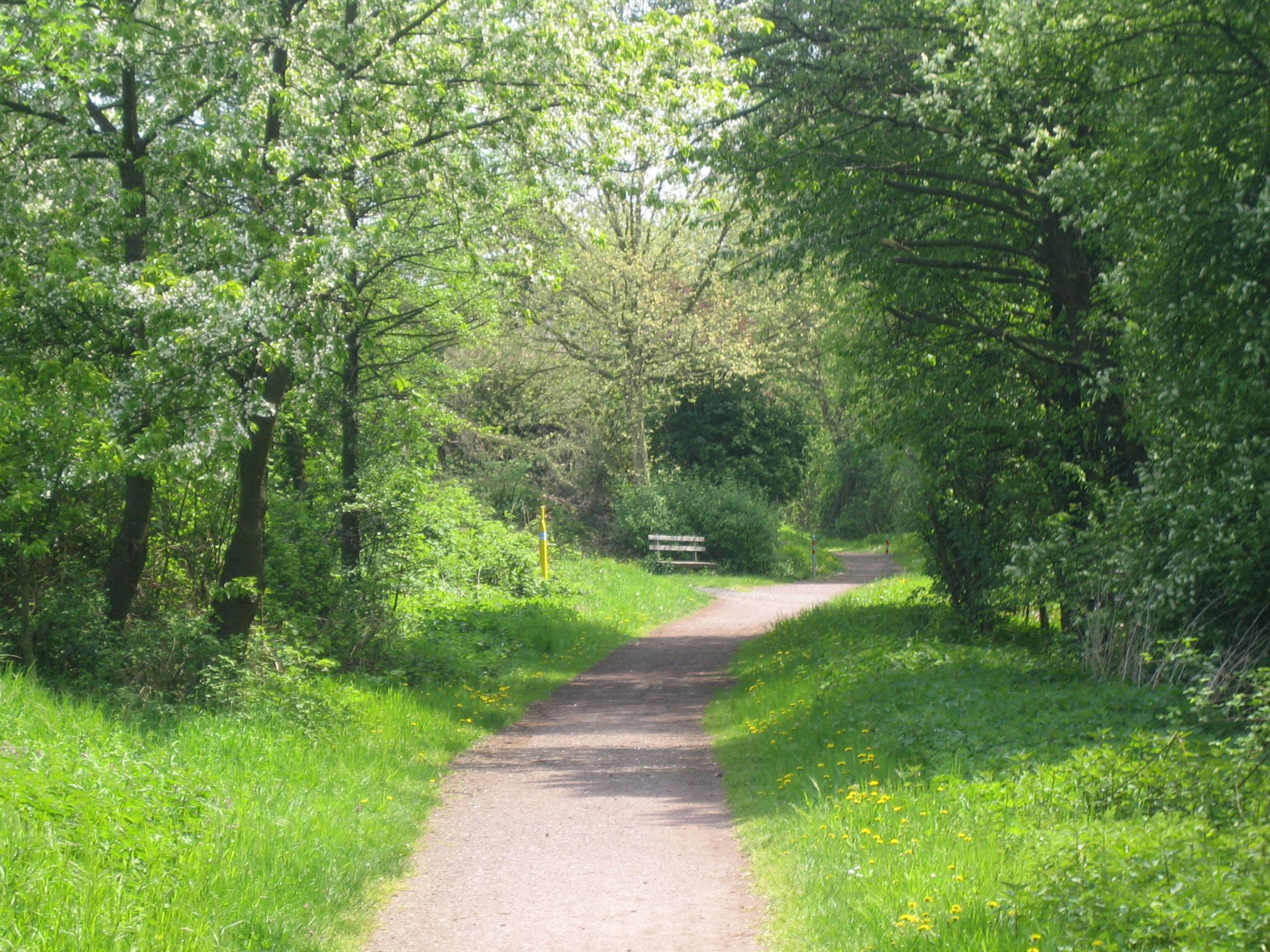
Footpath by the Klingbach in Billigheim-Ingenheim

The main source of the Klingbach is located in the southern Palatine Forest, the German part of the Wasgau, at a height of about 350 m above sea level (NN) on the northeast slope of the hill on which the ruined Lindelbrunn Castle stands. Another, almost equally strong, source is situated a good two kilometres to the south. The two source streams converged after about three kilometres in Silz.

The Klingbach leaves the hills in an eastern direction at Klingenmünster and crosses the German Wine Route before reaching the Upper Rhine Plain. It flows through the western half of the plain, initially in an easterly direction, but later swinging more to the northeast. Southeast of Rohrbach it is joined on the left by the Kaiserbach, almost 20 kilometres long, and above Herxheim by the eight kilometre long Quodbach.

Until the first half of the 19th century, the Klingbach emptied into a bend of the Upper Rhine east of Hördt. With the channelization of the Rhine its confluence became part of the (99 m above sea level (NN)) Old Rhine. Today the old bend in the river is a river in its own right, called the Michelsbach.

=== Municipalities along the Klingbach ===
- Silz
- Münchweiler
- Klingenmünster
- Heuchelheim-Klingen
- Billigheim-Ingenheim
- Steinweiler
- Rohrbach
- Herxheim
- Herxheimweyher
- Rülzheim
- Hördt

== History ==
Running upstream alongside the Klingbach is part of the southern section of the Palatine Ways of St. James.

To distinguish it from other places with the name Münster ("minster"), the municipality of Klingenmünster was named after the stream.

== See also ==
- List of rivers of Rhineland-Palatinate
