= Rheinzabern station =

Railway station in Germany

Rheinzabern
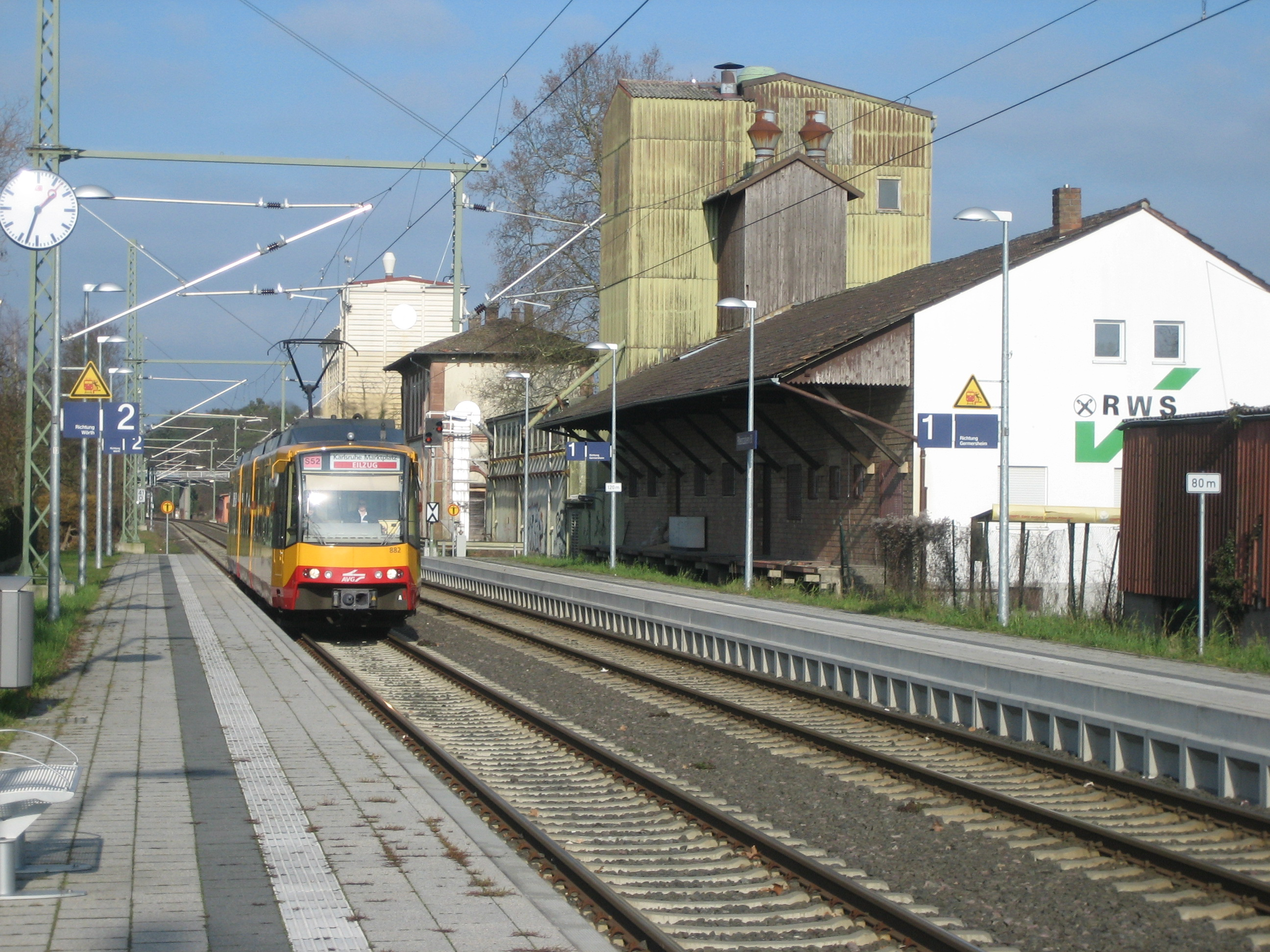
- Stadtbahn train at Rheinzabern station in February 2014

General information
- Location: Bahnhofstraße 26, Rheinzabern, Rhineland-Palatinate; Germany
- Coordinates: 49°07′11″N 8°16′27″E
- Line: Schifferstadt–Wörth (41.0 km)
- Platforms: 2

Construction
- Accessible: Yes
- Architectural style: Neoclassical

Other information
- Station code: 5429
- DS100 code: RRZA
- IBNR: 721609
- Category: 6
- Fare zone: KVV: 555; VRN: 213 (KVV transitional tariff)
- Website: www.bahnhof.de

History
- Opened: 25 June 1876

Services
Preceding station	Rhine-Neckar S-Bahn	Following station
Rülzheim towards Karlsruhe Hbf	S3	Rheinzabern Alte Römerstraße towards Karlsruhe Hbf
Rülzheim towards Ludwigshafen (Rhein) BASF Nord	S44 Limited service	Rheinzabern Alte Römerstraße One-way operation
Preceding station	Karlsruhe Stadtbahn	Following station
Rülzheim Freizeitzentrum towards Germersheim	S 51	Rheinzabern Rappengasse towards Söllingen or Pforzheim Hbf
Rülzheim Freizeitzentrum towards Germersheim	S 52	Rheinzabern Rappengasse towards Karlsruhe Marktplatz
Location

Rheinzabern station is the main station in the town of Rheinzabern in the German state of Rhineland-Palatinate. Deutsche Bahn classifies it as a category 6 station and it has two platform tracks. It is located on the network of the Karlsruher Verkehrsverbund (Karlsruhe Transport Association, KVV). Since 2001, the station has also been part of the area where the fares of the Verkehrsverbund Rhein-Neckar (Rhine-Neckar Transport Association, VRN) are accepted at a transitional rate. Its address is Bahnhofstraße 26.

It is located on the Schifferstadt–Wörth railway and was opened on 25 July 1876 with the commissioning of the Germersheim–Wörth section of that railway. It is now classified as a Haltepunkt (halt). Since late 2010, it has been part of the Karlsruhe Stadtbahn. Since two new halts were opened at the same time in Rheinzabern, it is also sometimes called Rheinzabern Bahnhof (Rheinzabern station) including in the recorded announcements of the Karlsruhe Stadtbahn.

== Location ==
The station is located on the northern edge of the built-up area of Rheinzabern.

== History ==
=== Railway initiatives around Rheinzabern ===
Originally the administration of the Circle of the Rhine (Rheinkreis), which was part of Bavaria, planned that its first railway line would be first in the north–south direction from Rheinschanze via Lauterbourg to Strasbourg, which would compete with the Mannheim–Basel railway proposed by Baden. However, instead it was decided to build the Palatine Ludwig Railway (Pfälzische Ludwigsbahn, Ludwigshafen–Bexbach), which was opened in the period from 1847 to 1849. In the meantime, discussions took place as to whether a line from Neustadt via Landau to Wissembourg or a line along the Rhine via Speyer, Germersheim and Wörth was more urgent and desirable. Since the military preferred a route on the edge of the Palatinate Forest (Pfälzerwald), this was built in the form of the Maximilian Railway between Neustadt and Wissembourg.

In the course of the endeavours to link the Maximilian Railway to the capital of Baden, several individuals from Rheinzabern and its neighbours campaigned for a route via Offenbach, Herxheim, Leimersheim and Leopoldshafen. This would have met an extension of the Schifferstadt–Speyer branch line, which was opened at the same time as the Ludwig Railway, near Rülzheim and they would have been connected accordingly. These plans, however, were in competition with the proposed Winden–Karlsruhe railway, which was finally preferred and opened in 1864. In the same year, the Speyer line was extended to Germersheim.

Also in 1864, a local committee from Rülzheim supported an extension of the line now ending in Germersheim to Wörth, which soon resulted in a first draft route plan. The location of the Rheinzabern station was however disputed. One option placed it to the east of the community, while another put it to the west. The neighbouring communities, which wanted to have it near them, also interfered in the debate. The committee itself called for the location in the west on 30 March 1872, which was finally accepted on 7 July 1872. The line to Wörth, including Rheinzabern station, was opened on 25 July 1876.

=== Further development ===
The station became part of the area of the Reichsbahndirektion (Reichsbahn railway division) of Ludwigshafen after the founding of the Deutsche Reichsbahn in 1922. During the dissolution of the railway division of Ludwigshafen, responsibility for it was transferred to the railway division of Mainz on 1 May 1937.

Deutsche Bundesbahn (DB), which was responsible for railway operations from 1949, assigned the station to the railway division of Mainz, which was responsible for all railway lines within the newly created state of Rhineland-Palatinate. In the course of the staged dissolution of the railway division of Mainz from 1 August 1971, its counterpart in Karlsruhe took responsibility for the station. The station had been downgraded to a halt in the 1990s. The station became part of the Karlsruhe Stadtbahn in December 2010.

== Entrance building ==
The former entrance building is a hip-roofed building, which is built in the Neoclassical style. It is heritage listed. It is no longer used for railway operations.

== Operations ==
The halt is served at 30-minute intervals. Lines S 51 and S 52 of Karlsruhe Stadtbahn run once an hour, beginning in Germersheim station and running to the Karlsruhe inner city. The former follows the Winden–Karlsruhe railway until shortly before Karlsruhe Hauptbahnhof, where it runs over the ramp to the Albtalbahnhof to connect with the tram network. The S 52 leaves the Winden–Karlsruhe railway east of Maxau, then runs over tram lines through the Karlsruhe district of Knielingen and from there to the inner city.
