= Michelsbach =

River in Germany

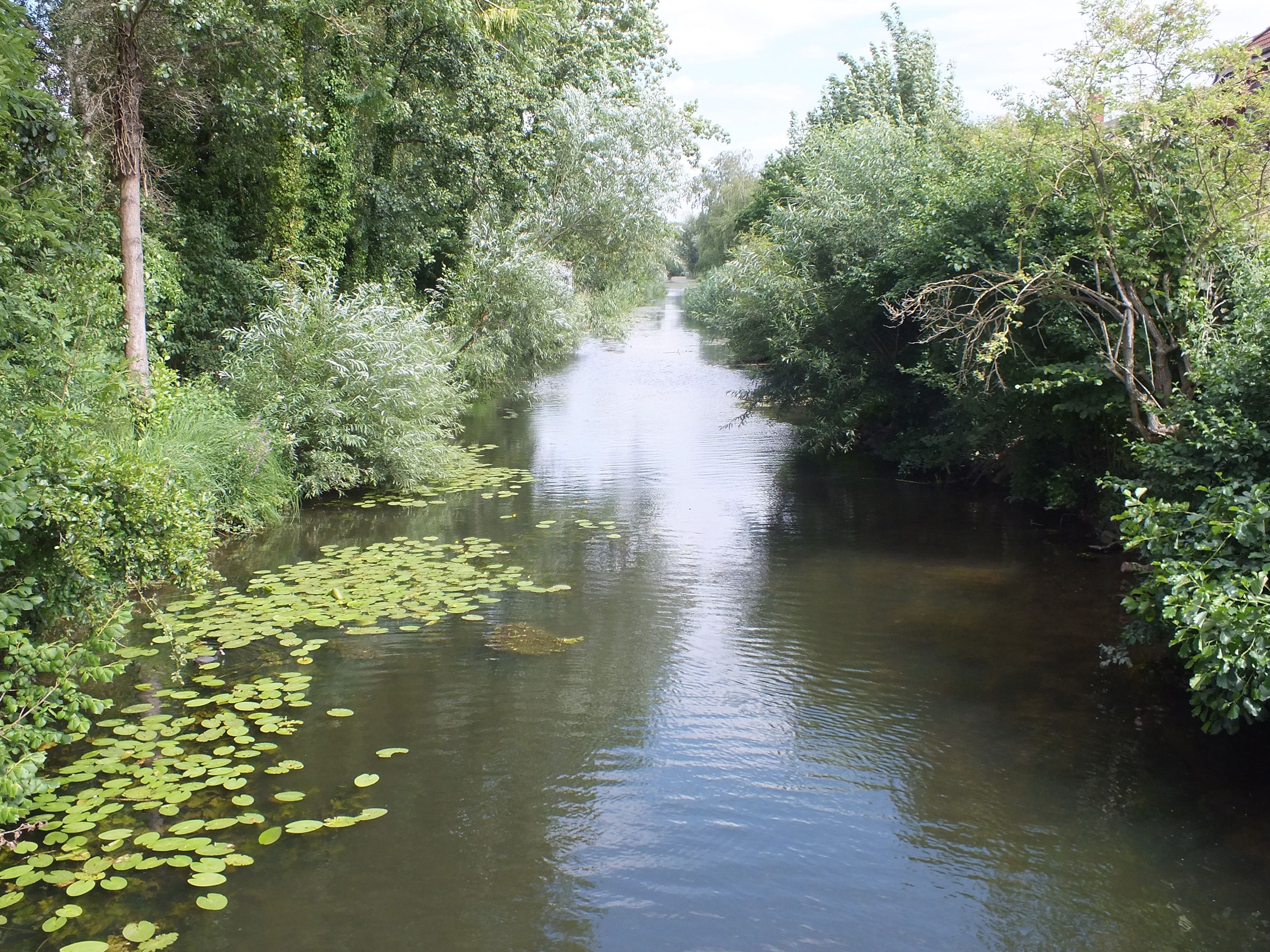
- The Michelsbach in Leimersheim

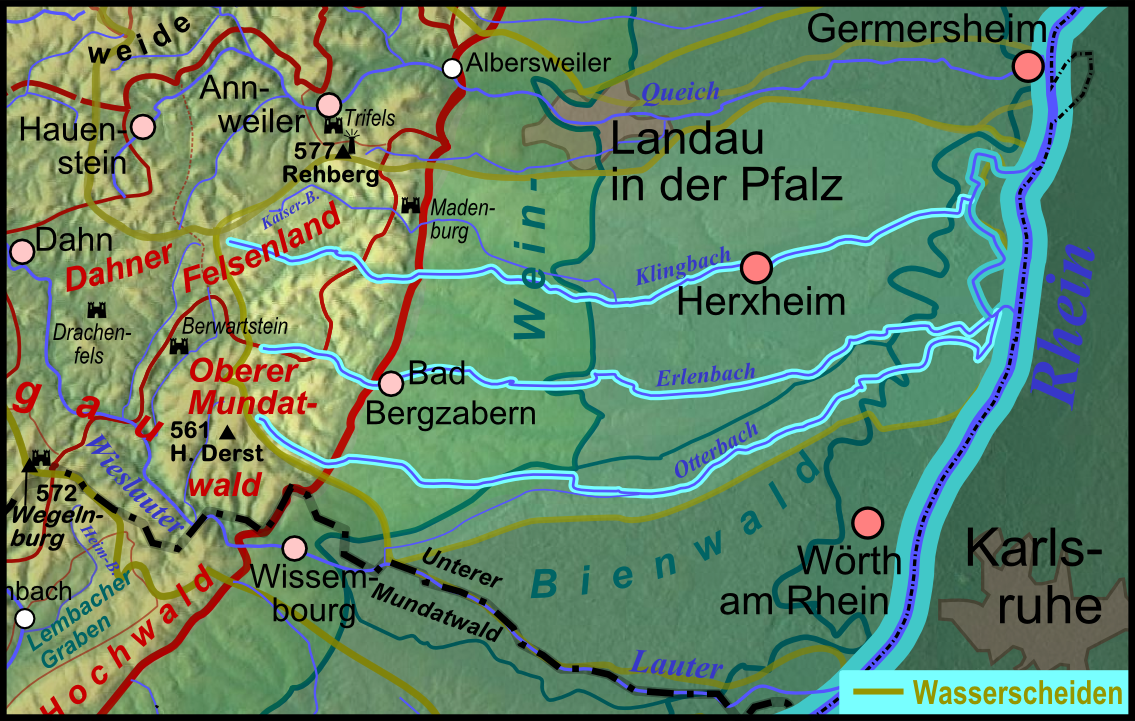
- The Michelsbach and its three main tributaries (from the north) Klingbach, Erlenbach and Otterbach

Location
- Country: Germany
- State: Rhineland-Palatinate
- Reference no.: DE: 23754

Physical characteristics
- Source
  - location: Origin: Confluence of the Erlenbach and Otterbach in Leimersheim
  - coordinates: 49°07′36″N 8°20′35″E
  - elevation: about 98 m above sea level (NN)
- Mouth
  - location: Via the Sondernheim Altrhein into the Rhine
  - coordinates: 49°11′15″N 8°22′50″E
  - elevation: about 96 m above sea level (NN)
- Length: 12.39 km (7.70 mi)
- Basin size: 336.907 km^{2} (130.081 sq mi)

Basin features
- Progression: Rhine→ North Sea
- Tributaries
  - left: Otterbach (nominally not a tributary), Erlenbach, Klingbach

The Michelsbach is a tributary of the Rhine in the German region of South Palatinate.

The Michelsbach's nominal start is the confluence of the Erlenbach and Otterbach in Leimersheim, but the Otterbach is officially not counted within its catchment area, but seen as a tributary of the Rhine. On the other hand, the Klingbach which joins it from the north and is roughly equally in volume (and also the Erlenbach) is counted as a tributary of the Michelsbach.

The Michelsbach flows from Leimersheim northwards and empties into the Sondernheim Old Rhine (Sondernheimer Altrhein). In doing so it passes through the municipalities of Leimersheim and Hördt as well as the Hördter Rheinaue nature reserve.

The Michelsbach is an outstanding river for canoeing, both for ordinary canoes as well as Canadian canoes. However, the stream has several forks as it makes its way northwards, some of which are dead ends.

== See also ==
- List of rivers of Rhineland-Palatinate
