= Herxheim =

Herxheim may refer to:

- Herxheim (Verbandsgemeinde), an administrative region in Rhineland-Palatinate, Germany
  - Herxheim bei Landau/Pfalz, a municipality in the Südliche Weinstraße district, seat of the administrative region
  - Herxheim (archaeological site), located in the municipality
- Herxheim am Berg, a municipality in the Bad Dürkheim district, in Rhineland-Palatinate, Germany
