= Rülzheim station =

Railway station in Germany

Rülzheim
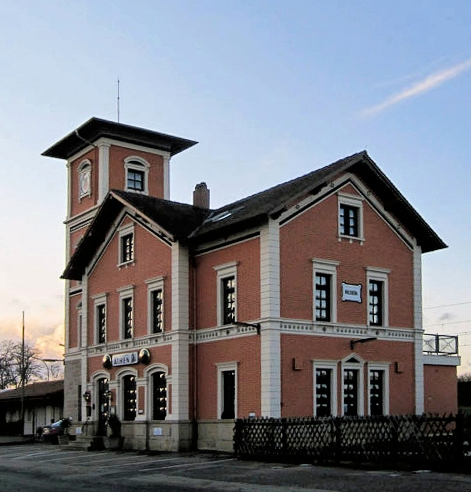
- Former Rülzheim station building

General information
- Location: Bahnhofstraße 6, Rülzheim, Rhineland-Palatinate; Germany
- Coordinates: 49°09′34″N 8°17′16″E
- Line: Schifferstadt–Wörth (36.2 km (new halt))
- Platforms: 2

Construction
- Accessible: Yes
- Architectural style: Neoclassical, Romanesque Revival

Other information
- Station code: 5429
- DS100 code: RRZH
- IBNR: 8005217
- Category: 6
- Fare zone: KVV: 565; VRN: 193 (KVV transitional tariff)
- Website: www.bahnhof.de

History
- Opened: 25 June 1876 (old station); 12 December 2010 (new halt)
- Closed: 12 December 2010 (old station)

Services
Preceding station	Rhine-Neckar S-Bahn	Following station
Bellheim towards Karlsruhe Hbf	S3	Rheinzabern towards Karlsruhe Hbf
Bellheim towards Ludwigshafen (Rhein) BASF Nord	S44 Limited service	Rheinzabern One-way operation
Preceding station	Karlsruhe Stadtbahn	Following station
Bellheim towards Germersheim	S 51	Rülzheim Freizeitzentrum towards Söllingen or Pforzheim Hbf
Bellheim towards Germersheim	S 52	Rülzheim Freizeitzentrum towards Karlsruhe Marktplatz
Location
- Location within Rhineland-Palatinate

Rülzheim station is a station in the town of Rülzheim in the German state of Rhineland-Palatinate. The original station was opened on 25 July 1876 with the commissioning of the Germersheim–Wörth section of Schifferstadt–Wörth railway. The address of the old entrance building, which is heritage listed, is Bahnhofstraße 6.

In the course of the integration of the Germersheim–Wörth section of the line into the network of the Karlsruhe Stadtbahn, it was replaced by a halt (Haltepunkt) called Rülzheim Bahnhof some 300 metres further north. Deutsche Bahn classifies the halt as a category 6 station and it has two platform tracks. It is located on the network of the Karlsruher Verkehrsverbund (Karlsruhe Transport Association, KVV). Since 2001, the station has also been part of the area where the fares of the Verkehrsverbund Rhein-Neckar (Rhine-Neckar Transport Association, VRN) are accepted at a transitional rate.

== Location ==
The former station was on the northern edge of the built-up area of Rülzheim. The local Bahnhofstraße (station street), runs parallel to and to the east of the tracks, which run in this section from northeast to southwest; it also forms part of the route of state road 493. To the west and north, agricultural land abuts the station. The railway itself comes from the north and passes through the municipality in an elongated S-curve, in the middle of which both the former station and the modern halt are located. The latter is about 300 metres further north-east directly next to state road 540 to Bellheim.

== History ==
=== Railway initiatives around Rülzheim ===
Originally the administration of the Circle of the Rhine (Rheinkreis), which was part of Bavaria, planned that its first railway line would be first in the north–south direction from Rheinschanze via Lauterbourg to Strasbourg, which would compete with the Mannheim–Basel railway proposed by Baden. However, instead it was decided to build the Palatine Ludwig Railway (Pfälzische Ludwigsbahn, Ludwigshafen–Bexbach), which was opened in the period from 1847 to 1849. In the meantime, discussions took place as to whether a line from Neustadt via Landau to Wissembourg or a line along the Rhine via Speyer, Germersheim and Wörth was more urgent and desirable. Since the military preferred a route on the edge of the Palatinate Forest (Pfälzerwald), this was built in the form of the Maximilian Railway between Neustadt and Wissembourg.

In the course of the endeavours to link the Maximilian Railway to the capital of Baden, several individuals from Rheinzabern and its neighbours campaigned for a route via Offenbach, Herxheim, Leimersheim and Leopoldshafen. This would have met an extension of the Schifferstadt–Speyer branch line, which was opened at the same time as the Ludwig Railway, near Rülzheim and they would have been connected accordingly. These plans, however, were in competition with the proposed Winden–Karlsruhe railway, which was finally preferred and opened in 1864. In the same year, the Speyer line was extended to Germersheim.

Also in 1864, a local committee from Rülzheim supported an extension of the line now ending in Germersheim to Wörth, which soon resulted in a first draft route plan. The location of the Rülzheim station was however disputed. One option placed it to the east of the community, while another put it to the west. The neighbouring communities, which wanted to have it near them, also interfered in the debate. The committee itself called for the location in the west on 30 March 1872, which was finally accepted on 7 July 1872. The line to Wörth, including Rülzheim station, was opened on 25 July 1876.

=== Further development ===
The station became part of the area of the Reichsbahndirektion (Reichsbahn railway division) of Ludwigshafen after the founding of the Deutsche Reichsbahn in 1922. During the dissolution of the railway division of Ludwigshafen, responsibility for it was transferred to the railway division of Mainz on 1 May 1937.

Deutsche Bundesbahn (DB), which was responsible for railway operations from 1949, assigned the station to the railway division of Mainz, which was responsible for all railway lines within the newly created state of Rhineland-Palatinate. In the course of the staged dissolution of the railway division of Mainz from 1 August 1971, its counterpart in Karlsruhe took responsibility for the station. The station had been downgraded to a halt in the 1990s. The station became part of the Karlsruhe Stadtbahn in December 2010.

== Entrance building ==
The former entrance building is built of brick with elements of the Neoclassical and Romanesque Revival styles. The heritage-listed building also has a three-storey tower. It is no longer used for railway operations. In the 1980s, it was renovated by a local association and part of it is used as a restaurant. The former freight shed also still exists and was restored in the 2000s.

== Operations ==
The new halt is served at 30-minute intervals. Lines S 51 and S 52 of Karlsruhe Stadtbahn run once an hour, beginning in Germersheim station and running to the Karlsruhe inner city. The former follows the Winden–Karlsruhe railway until shortly before Karlsruhe Hauptbahnhof, where it runs over the ramp to the Albtalbahnhof to connect with the tram network. The S 52 leaves the Winden–Karlsruhe railway east of Maxau, then runs over tram lines through the Karlsruhe district of Knielingen and from there to the inner city.
