= Bellheim station =

Railway station in Bellheim, Germany

Bellheim
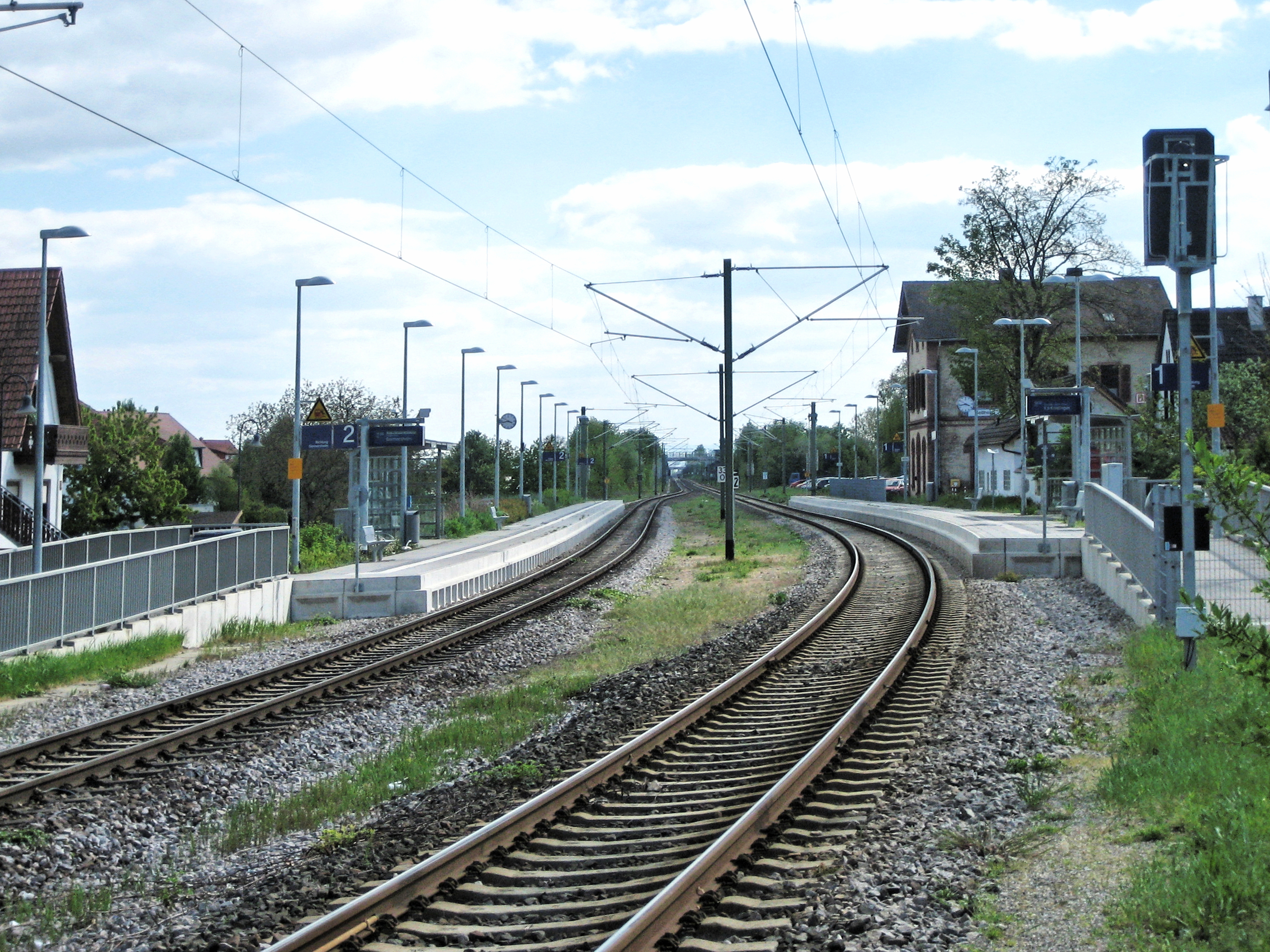
- Bellheim station platforms and the former entrance building

General information
- Location: Bahnhofstr. 8, Bellheim, Rhineland-Palatinate; Germany
- Coordinates: 49°11′18″N 8°17′40″E
- Line: Schifferstadt–Wörth (33.0 km)
- Platforms: 2

Construction
- Accessible: Yes

Other information
- Station code: 476
- DS100 code: RBLH
- IBNR: 8000863
- Category: 6
- Fare zone: KVV: 565; VRN: 193 (KVV transitional tariff)
- Website: www.bahnhof.de

History
- Opened: 25 June 1876

Services
Preceding station	Rhine-Neckar S-Bahn	Following station
Sondernheim towards Karlsruhe Hbf	S3	Rülzheim towards Karlsruhe Hbf
Sondernheim towards Ludwigshafen (Rhein) BASF Nord	S44 Limited service	Rülzheim One-way operation
Preceding station	Karlsruhe Stadtbahn	Following station
Bellheim Am Mühlbuckel towards Germersheim	S 51	Rülzheim towards Söllingen or Pforzheim Hbf
Bellheim Am Mühlbuckel towards Germersheim	S 52	Rülzheim towards Karlsruhe Marktplatz
Location

Bellheim station is a station in the village of Bellheim in the German state of Rhineland-Palatinate. Deutsche Bahn classifies it as a category 6 station and it has two platform tracks. The station is located in the network of the Karlsruher Verkehrsverbund (Karlsruhe Transport Association, KVV). Since 2001, the station has also been part of the area where the fares of the Verkehrsverbund Rhein-Neckar (Rhine-Neckar Transport Association, VRN) are accepted at a transitional rate. The address of the station is Bahnhofstraße 8.

It is located on the Schifferstadt–Wörth railway and was opened on 25 July 1876 with the commissioning of the Germersheim–Wörth section of that railway. It is now classified as a Haltepunkt (halt). Since late 2010 it has been part of the Karlsruhe Stadtbahn. Since a new halt was opened at the same time, it is sometimes called Bellheim Bahnhof (Bellheim station), including in the recorded announcements of the Karlsruhe Stadtbahn.

== Location ==
The station is located on the south-eastern outskirts of Bellheim.

== History ==
=== Railway initiatives around Bellheim ===
Originally the administration of the Circle of the Rhine (Rheinkreis), which was part of Bavaria, planned that its first railway line would be first in the north–south direction from Rheinschanze via Lauterbourg to Strasbourg, which would compete with the Mannheim–Basel railway proposed by Baden. However, instead it was decided to build the Palatine Ludwig Railway (Pfälzische Ludwigsbahn, Ludwigshafen–Bexbach), which was opened in the period from 1847 to 1849. In the meantime, discussions took place as to whether a line from Neustadt via Landau to Wissembourg or a line along the Rhine via Speyer, Germersheim and Wörth was more urgent and desirable. Since the military preferred a route on the edge of the Palatinate Forest (Pfälzerwald), this was built in the form of the Maximilian Railway between Neustadt and Wissembourg.

The line to Speyer, which was opened in 1847, was extended to Germersheim in 1864. As a result, plans were made to establish a strategic railway between the fortresses of Germersheim and Landau. Of a total of four options, two would have run south of the Queich via Offenbach. The city council of Landau, in particular, supported a route through Bellheim. Nevertheless, the line was built north of the river, passing through Westheim, Oberlustadt and Niederlustadt and Zeiskam.

In 1863 and 1864, a local committee from the surrounding community of Rülzheim, which included representatives of Bellheim, campaigned to extend the line that ended in Germersheim to Wörth. Subsequently, its first plan was produced, showing a route that ran via Bellheim.

=== Further development ===
The station became part of the area of the Reichsbahndirektion (Reichsbahn railway division) of Ludwigshafen after the founding of the Deutsche Reichsbahn in 1922. During the dissolution of the railway division of Ludwigshafen, responsibility for it was transferred to the railway division of Mainz on 1 May 1937.

Deutsche Bundesbahn (DB), which was responsible for railway operations from 1949, assigned the station to the railway division of Mainz, which was responsible for all railway lines within the newly created state of Rhineland-Palatinate. In the course of the staged dissolution of the railway division of Mainz from 1 August 1971, its counterpart in Karlsruhe took responsibility for the station. The station had been downgraded to a halt in the 1990s. The station became part of the Karlsruhe Stadtbahn in 2010. This involved the replacement of the island platform by a side platform.

== Entrance building ==
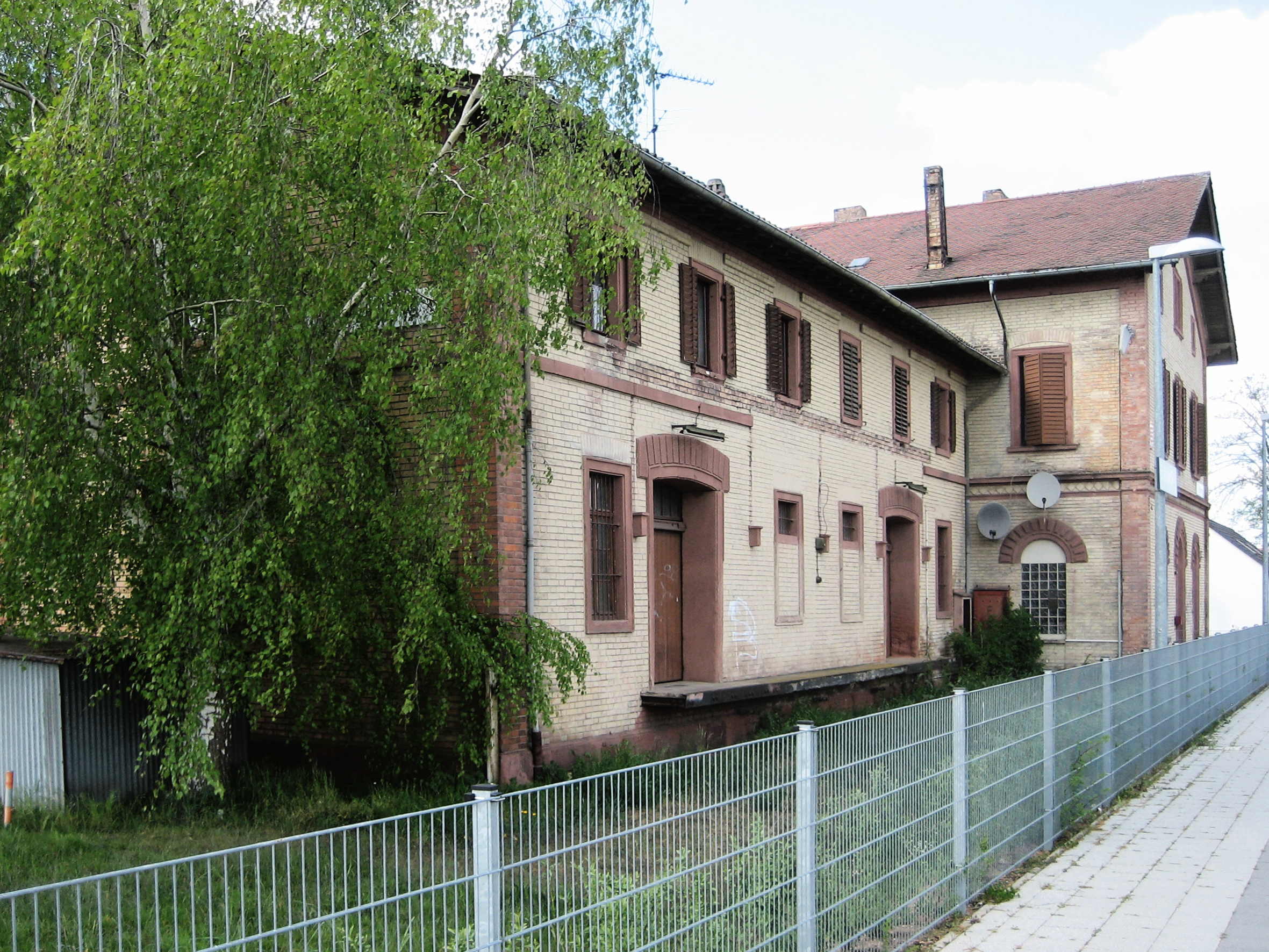
Entrance building

The former entrance building was built around 1870 as a so-called "standard building" in brick. It was built in the period when the station was opened and is under heritage protection. It is no longer used for railway operations.

== Operations ==
The station is served at 30-minute intervals. Lines S 51 and S 52 of Karlsruhe Stadtbahn run once an hour, beginning in Germersheim station and running to the Karlsruhe inner city. The former follows the Winden–Karlsruhe railway until shortly before Karlsruhe Hauptbahnhof, where it runs over the ramp to the Albtalbahnhof to connect with the tram network. The S 52 leaves the Winden–Karlsruhe railway east of Maxau, then runs over tram lines through the Karlsruhe district of Knielingen and from there to the inner city.

Previously, Bellheim station had a connecting line to a NATO oil terminal and one to the Büromöbelfabrik Kardex, both of which are now dismantled.
