= Otterbach (Rhine) =

River in Germany

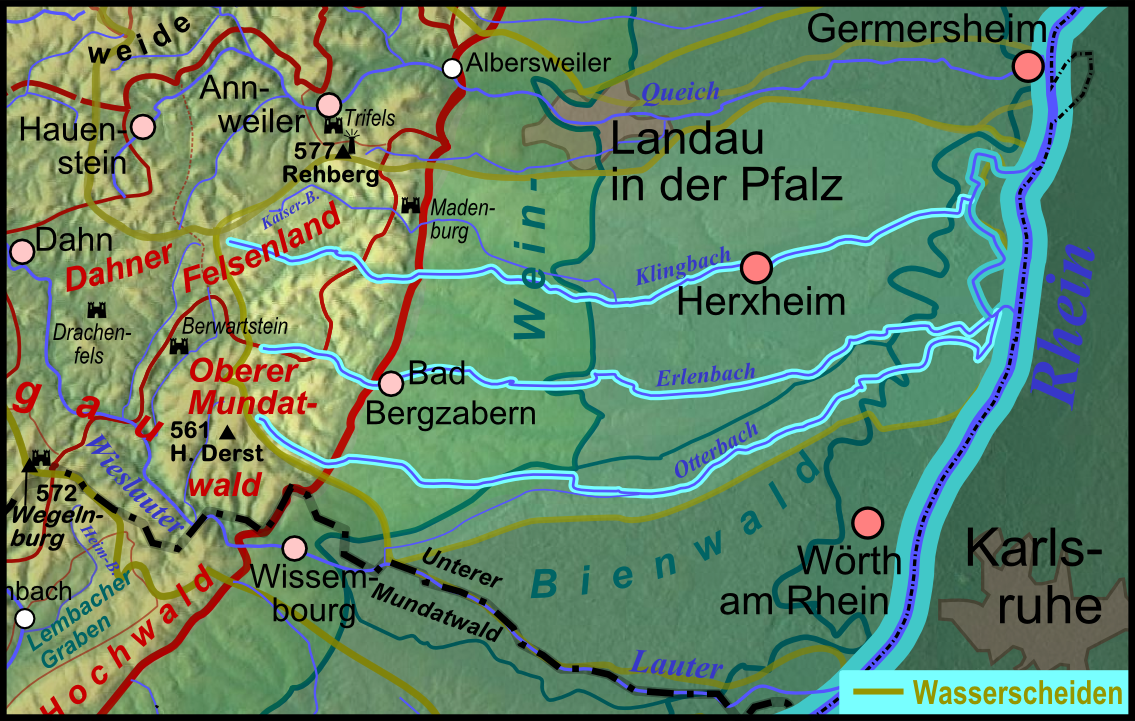
- Course of the Otterbach (bottom)

Location
- Country: Germany
- State: Rhineland-Palatinate
- Reference no.: DE: 237522

Physical characteristics
- Source
  - location: Near Oberotterbach
  - coordinates: 49°04′53″N 7°55′53″E
  - elevation: roughly 282 m above sea level (NN)
- Mouth
  - location: At Leimersheim into the Michelsbach
  - coordinates: 49°07′36″N 8°20′35″E
  - elevation: roughly 98 m above sea level (NN)
- Length: 42.23 km

Basin features
- Progression: Michelsbach→ Rhine→ North Sea
- Landmarks: Small towns: Kandel, Wörth am Rhein
- Population: 119.158
- Tributaries
  - left: Dierbach
  - right: Bruchbach
- Waterbodies: Reservoirs: Fischmal

The Otterbach (German pronunciation: [ˈɔtɐbax]) is a stream, 42 kilometres long, in South Palatinate in the German state of Rhineland-Palatinate, that flows eastwards and northeastwards towards the Upper Rhine.

== Course ==
The Otterbach rises in the area of the Upper Mundat Forest in the southeast of the Palatine Forest. Its source lies at a height of about 300 metres on the hillside east of Guttenberg Castle between the Hohe Derst (561 m high, to the north) and the Hoher Kopf (497 m high, to the south).

After breaking out of the low mountain range into the Upper Rhine Valley, the Otterbach flows through the two villages named after it, Oberotterbach and Niederotterbach, then through Vollmersweiler and Freckenfeld, where it passes the northern edge of the Bienwald woods. In Minfeld it is joined from the left by the Dierbach, and then forms the border between the districts of Kandel and Wörth. In Kandel, the Bruchbach enters it from the right. The Otterbach meanders markedly on its way through Jockgrim. After it has passed through Neupotz, it is impounded southeast of Leimersheim to form the Fischmal, a reservoir 1½ kilometres long and up to 100 metres wide that is a biotope for many aquatic birds and plants.

Whilst some of the Otterbach's waters are diverted to the right through a pumping station on the Rhine embankment directly into the Rhine itself, the left-hand branch of the river flows through the village of Leimersheim and is united there with the Erlenbach coming from the left to form the Michelsbach. This is a former loop of the Old Rhine that discharges after a good twelve kilometres from the left into the Rhine.

Despite the route of its lower reaches, the Otterbach is counted as a direct tributary of the Rhine (or the Leimersheim Old Rhine - Leimersheimer Altrheins - flowing eastwards), something that is also acknowledged by the GKZs (Michelsbach 23754, Otterbach 237522)..

== See also ==
- List of rivers of Rhineland-Palatinate
