= Vulcan Energy Resources =

Lithium and renewable energy producer

Vulcan Energy Resources is a lithium and renewable energy producer, specializing in the production of lithium with a net-zero carbon footprint.

The company's stated goal is to decarbonize the transition to electric mobility through its Zero Carbon Lithium™ project. By utilizing Europe's largest lithium deposit, located in the waters of Germany's Upper Rhine Valley, Vulcan is able to produce lithium without the use of evaporation ponds or mining. The Vulcan Group has also developed a process to produce lithium with net zero carbon emissions through the use of geothermal energy, supporting the goal of cross-industry decarbonisation.

== History ==
=== 2018: Founding and Market Entrance ===
Vulcan Energy was founded in 2018 by geologists Dr. Francis Wedin, who now acts as managing director and CEO, and Dr. Horst Kreuter. Wedin started his career in the Australian mining industry and began exploring ways to mine lithium using environmentally friendly geothermal resources in 2014. Kreuter, a native of Germany, has been developing and implementing geothermal projects around the globe for over 20 years. In June 2018, Vulcan Energy Resources went public on the Australian stock market.

=== 2019–2021: First Studies and Purchase Agreements ===
After two years of initial research, in February 2021, the consulting firm Minviro conducted a cradle-to-grave life cycle assessment (LCA) on Vulcan's production of lithium hydroxide monohydrate (LHM) from the project and process data produced at a pre-feasibility study level. Five different impact categories were evaluated: global warming potential, acidification potential, eutrophication potential, water use, and land use. Results of the LCA estimate a net negative 2.9 tonnes of CO_{2} emitted per tonne of LHM produced from Vulcan's Zero Carbon Lithium Project, including scope 1, 2, and 3 emissions. This was the world's first life cycle assessment and global environmental footprint study of lithium hydroxide monohydrate (LHM) production.

In 2021, Vulcan began partnering with supply chain tracing company Circulor to establish a full lithium traceability and dynamic CO_{2} measurement solution for its Zero Carbon Lithium™ across the European lithium-ion battery and electric vehicle supply chain.

Since April 2021, Vulcan has operated a pilot plant in Landau to adapt their lithium extraction process, tested in South America, to the properties of the thermal water from the Upper Rhine Valley. In April 2021, Vulcan also acquired Geothermal Engineering GmbH and gec-co Global Engineering & Consulting to operate their geothermal energy and power plant heating and cooling systems. In September 2021, the first lithium hydroxide material samples from the pilot plant were made available to automobile and battery manufacturers for quality testing.

Vulcan signed its first purchase agreements for lithium delivery to battery and electric vehicle manufacturers in 2021. The Renault Group partnered with Vulcan Energy in August 2021 to sign a deal for a five-year supply of lithium, with a planned delivery date in 2026. Umicore, a Belgian battery cathode specialist, and Vulcan signed a long-term supply agreement in October 2021, which will take effect in 2025 with an initial duration of five years. In November 2021, Stellantis and Vulcan announced a binding agreement for Vulcan to supply battery-grade lithium hydroxide in Europe for electric vehicles from 2026. Finally, in December 2021 the Vulcan group signed an offtake agreement with Volkswagen for lithium, to be delivered from 2026 on over an initial period of five years.

=== 2022-2024: Expansion of activities ===
==== Geothermal ====
Vulcan acquired a new geothermal power plant in Insheim in January 2022, along with securing offtake agreements from their existing geothermal plant in Landau. The acquisition allowed Vulcan's geothermal branch, Natürlich Insheim, to begin generating revenue as a geothermal energy producer, earning €1.7 million in March 2022. In April 2022, Mannheim-based energy company MVV and Vulcan Energy signed a 20-year purchase agreement for renewable geothermal heat, wherein Vulcan agrees to supply MVV with 240–350 gigawatt hours of renewable heat per year from 2025 onwards.

==== Lithium Exploration ====
In January 2022, Vulcan secured five exploration licenses in Germany for the development of new areas with potential for geothermal energy and CO_{2}-free lithium production in the Upper Rhine Valley. Soon after, the company secured a permit from the Italian government to explore the Cesano geothermal region near Rome. In response, ENEL Green Power and Vulcan signed a wide-ranging agreement in July 2022 to conduct joint geothermal lithium research at the Cesano site. In November 2022, Vulcan announced plans to develop further exploration areas in Alsace, along the French side of the Upper Rhine Valley. To accomplish this, the company has applied for an initial exploration permit and founded a French subsidiary, Vulcan Energy France (VEF), with a branch office in Haguenau.

==== Laboratory and Product Developments ====
Vulcan opened a new laboratory in Karlsruhe-Durlach in February 2022, for the purpose of expanding the analytical capabilities of their lithium division.

Chemical company Nobian and Vulcan announced a venture to build a joint lithium refinery at the Höchst Industrial Park in Frankfurt, located close to the sites used for Vulcan's Zero Carbon Lithium™ project. The plant will use Nobian's electrolysers to convert extracted lithium chloride into high-purity lithium hydroxide. With an electrolysis process, Vulcan is able to produce lithium hydroxide with a purity grade of 57.1%, exceeding the 56.5% specification set by battery manufacturers. For this process, Vulcan also developed a new sorbent, consisting primarily of lithium chloride aluminate. At the test plant, the sorbent demonstrated higher performance than commercially available options, as well as lower water requirements.

==== Market Activity ====
Vulcan Energy Resources was listed on the Frankfurt Stock Exchange in February 2022 with a first price of €5.65.

In January 2022, e-mobility battery manufacturer LG Energy Solutions and Vulcan signed a binding offtake agreement for lithium hydroxide with a purchase volume between 41,000 and 50,000 tonnes. The supply contract will start in 2025 with an initial duration of 5 years and the lithium will be processed in LG's European plant.

In June 2022, French car manufacturer Stellantis invested 50 million euros in Vulcan Energy, becoming the company's second-largest shareholder and the first carmaker to invest in a listed lithium company. Stellantis also extended their supply agreement with Vulcan an additional 10 years to 2035.

==== Other Activities ====
In May 2022, Vulcan founder and CEO Francis Wedin was presented a 40 Under 40 Award by WA Business News.

Vulcan joined the UN Global Compact, a corporate sustainability initiative from the United Nations, in 2022.

=== 2025–2026: Lionheart project ===
In December 2025, Vulcan Energy took a final investment decision on Phase One of its Lionheart project in Germany after securing a €2.2 billion financing package; construction began that month. The company announced financial close for the package in May 2026. Phase One is designed to produce 24,000 tonnes of lithium hydroxide monohydrate annually, as well as 275 GWh of renewable electricity and 560 GWh of renewable heat per year.

== Technology ==
Vulcan Energy uses patented technology to extract dissolved lithium found in the thermal waters of underground reservoirs in the Upper Rhine Valley, Europe's largest lithium deposit. To extract the dissolved lithium, the brine undergoes a physical filtering process wherein the lithium binds to the filter. The heat from the thermal water can generate energy for the lithium extraction and the evaporation process of the lithium solution.

The evaporation process takes place in a closed-loop circuit without the use of evaporation ponds, and the thermal water can be deposited back underground after the lithium is extracted, since the process does not use additives, Because the electricity used for the electrical components of the lithium production is a product of the geothermal system, the lithium production is climate-neutral: it uses no fossil fuels, and no CO_{2} is emitted during the production process. Additional geothermal energy can then be fed into local energy grids, providing a renewable heat and energy source for communities located in production areas.

After extraction, the lithium is purified and processed into lithium hydroxide to be used in cathodes and battery cells. The batteries are either installed in electric vehicles or used to store fluctuating renewable energies such as solar and wind. After the end of the battery life cycle, the lithium can be recovered in a recycling process. By extracting lithium in one of the key regions of the German automotive industry, and in a region where demand for electric cars is growing significantly, dependence on international supply chains and emissions from production can be reduced.

== Operations ==
Vulcan's business consists of three main areas of operation: renewable energy and heat, zero carbon lithium extraction, and electrified drilling to enable renewable energy production. Within these areas, Vulcan has several smaller operating entities. These are:

- Vulcan Subsurface Solutions (formerly GeoThermal Engineering), responsible for deep geothermal projects
- Vulcan Energy Engineering (formerly Gec-Co Global Engineering & Consulting), responsible for surface geothermal projects
- Natürlich Insheim, Vulcan's operating geothermal power plant
- VERCANA, responsible for electric drilling
