= Sondernheim station =

Railway station in Germersheim, Germany

Sondernheim
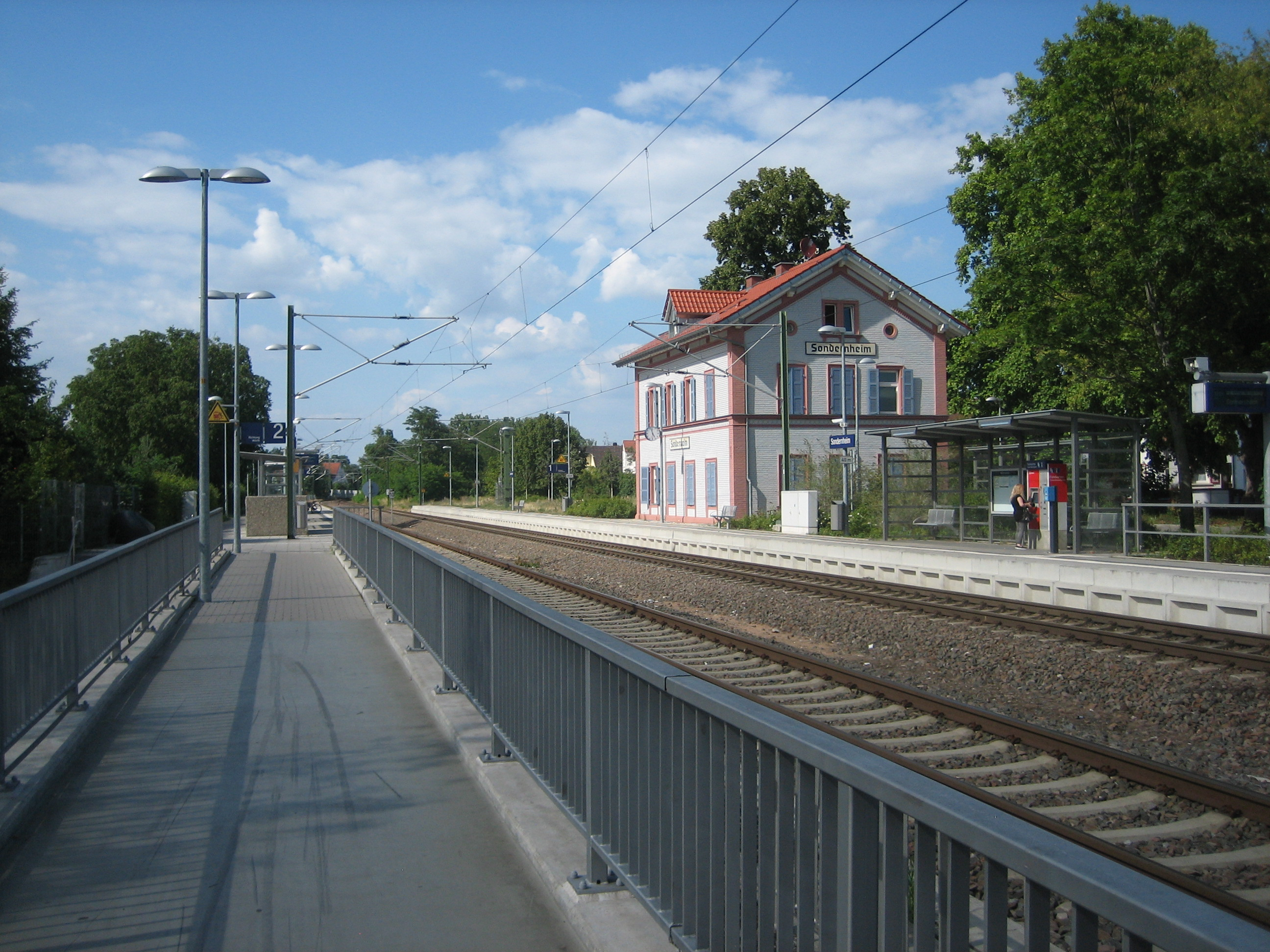
- Sondernheim station, looking towards Germersheim with the two platforms and the former entrance building

General information
- Location: Germersheimer Str. 14, Sondernheim; Germersheim, Rhineland-Palatinate; Germany
- Coordinates: 49°11′42″N 8°21′37″E
- Line: Schifferstadt–Wörth (27.5 km)
- Platforms: 2

Construction
- Accessible: Yes
- Architectural style: Neoclassical

Other information
- Station code: 5897
- DS100 code: RSOH
- IBNR: 8005602
- Category: 6
- Fare zone: KVV: 575; VRN: 183 (KVV transitional tariff)
- Website: www.bahnhof.de

History
- Opened: 25 June 1876

Services
Preceding station	Rhine-Neckar S-Bahn	Following station
Germersheim Süd/Nolte towards Karlsruhe Hbf	S3	Bellheim towards Karlsruhe Hbf
Germersheim Süd/Nolte towards Ludwigshafen (Rhein) BASF Nord	S44 Limited service	Bellheim One-way operation
Preceding station	Karlsruhe Stadtbahn	Following station
Germersheim Süd/Nolte towards Germersheim	S 51	Bellheim Am Mühlbuckel towards Söllingen or Pforzheim Hbf
Germersheim Süd/Nolte towards Germersheim	S 52	Bellheim Am Mühlbuckel towards Karlsruhe Marktplatz
Location

Sondernheim station is a station in the Germersheim suburb of Sondernheim, in the German state of Rhineland-Palatinate. Deutsche Bahn classifies it as a category 6 station and it has two platform tracks. The station is located in the network of the Karlsruher Verkehrsverbund (Karlsruhe Transport Association, KVV) and belongs to fare zone 575. Since 2001, the station has also been part of the area where the fares of the Verkehrsverbund Rhein-Neckar (Rhine-Neckar Transport Association, VRN) are accepted at a transitional rate. The address of the station is Germersheimer Straße 14. Its former entrance building is under heritage protection.

It is located on the Schifferstadt–Wörth railway and was opened on 25 July 1876 with the commissioning of the Germersheim–Wörth section of that railway. It is now classified as a Haltepunkt (halt). Since late 2010 it has been part of the Karlsruhe Stadtbahn.

== Location ==
The station is located in the suburb of Sondernheim.

== History ==
=== Railway initiatives around Sondernheim ===
Originally the administration of the Circle of the Rhine (Rheinkreis), which was part of Bavaria, planned that its first railway line would be first in the north–south direction from Rheinschanze via Lauterbourg to Strasbourg, which would compete with the Mannheim–Basel railway proposed by Baden. However, instead it was decided to build the Palatine Ludwig Railway (Pfälzische Ludwigsbahn, Ludwigshafen–Bexbach), which was opened in the period from 1847 to 1849. In the meantime, discussions took place as to whether a line from Neustadt via Landau to Wissembourg or a line along the Rhine via Speyer, Germersheim and Wörth was more urgent and desirable. Since the military preferred a route on the edge of the Palatinate Forest (Pfälzerwald), this was built in the form of the Maximilian Railway between Neustadt and Wissembourg.

In 1863 and 1864, a local committee from Rülzheim and other surrounding communities, campaigned to extend the line ending in Germersheim to Wörth, which was followed shortly afterwards by its first plan, which showed a route that ran via Sondernheim, among other places. Subsequently, Sondernheim station was opened on 25 June 1876.

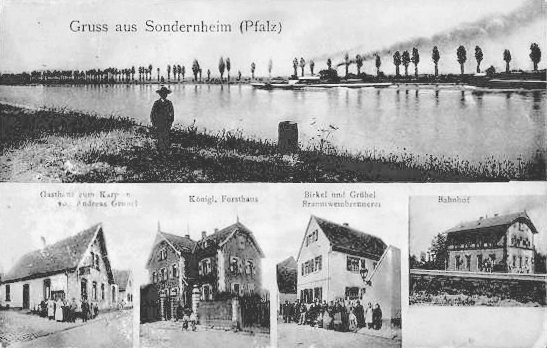
Sondernheim station (below right) from a postcard of 1910

=== Further development ===
The station became part of the area of the Reichsbahndirektion (Reichsbahn railway division) of Ludwigshafen after the founding of the Deutsche Reichsbahn in 1922. During the dissolution of the railway division of Ludwigshafen, responsibility for it was transferred to the railway division of Mainz on 1 May 1936.

Deutsche Bundesbahn (DB), which was responsible for railway operations from 1949, assigned the station to the railway division of Mainz, which was responsible for all railway lines within the newly created state of Rhineland-Palatinate. In the course of the staged dissolution of the railway division of Mainz from 1 August 1971, its counterpart in Karlsruhe took responsibility for the station. In the meantime the station had been downgraded to a halt. The station became part of the Karlsruhe Stadtbahn in 2010. This was followed by the renewal of the platform.

== Entrance building ==
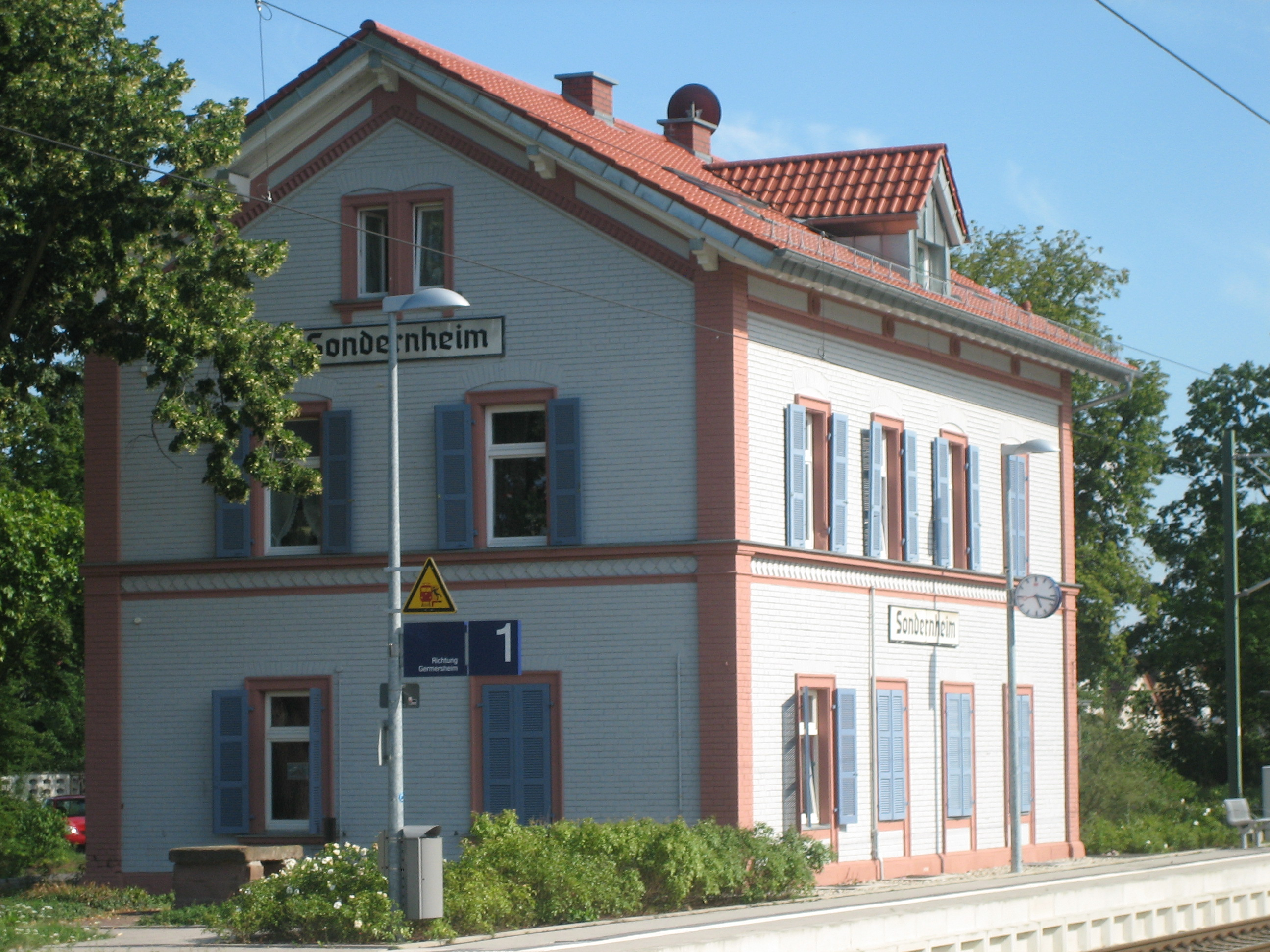
Entrance building

The former entrance building was built around 1870 in the neoclassical style out of brick. It was built in the period when the station was opened and is under heritage protection. It is no longer used for railway operations; instead, it houses a local youth club.

== Operations ==
The station is served at 30-minute intervals. Lines S 51 and S 52 of Karlsruhe Stadtbahn run once an hour, beginning in Germersheim station and running to the Karlsruhe inner city. The former follows the Winden–Karlsruhe railway until shortly before Karlsruhe Hauptbahnhof, where it runs over the ramp to the Albtalbahnhof to connect with the tram network. The S 52 leaves the Winden–Karlsruhe railway east of Maxau, then runs over tram lines through the Karlsruhe district of Knielingen and from there to the inner city. Freight operations at the station have been abandoned.
