= Südliche Weinstraße Wildlife Park =

Zoo in Germany

Südliche Weinstraße Wildlife Park (Wild- und Wanderpark Südliche Weinstraße)
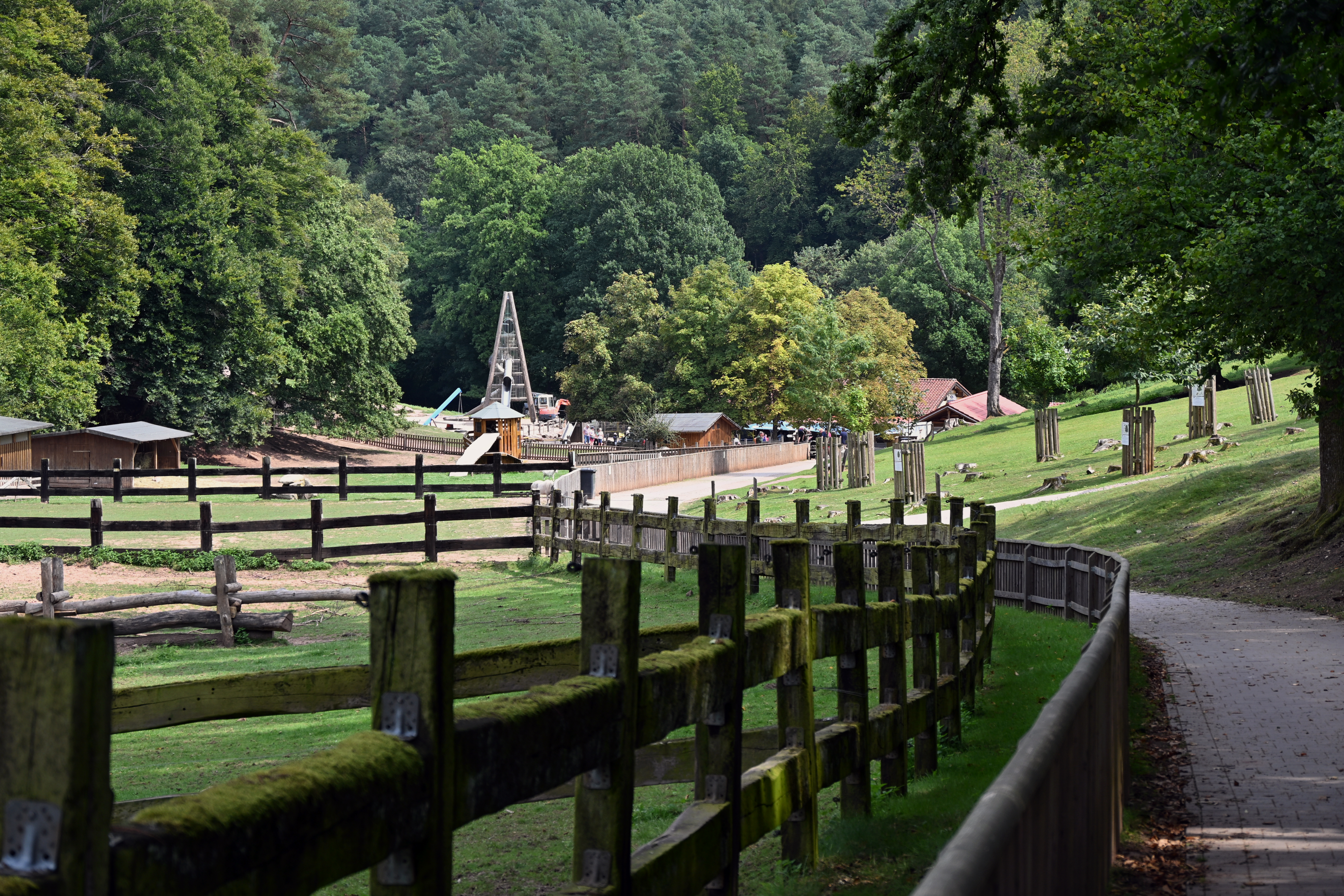
- Interactive map of Südliche Weinstraße Wildlife Park (Wild- und Wanderpark Südliche Weinstraße)
- 49°8′24″N 7°55′56″E
- Date opened: 18 April 1975
- Land area: 100 ha (250 acres)
- No. of animals: about 400
- No. of species: about 15
- Annual visitors: 100,000
- Owner: Marianne Geppert and Michael Müller
- Website: https://www.wildpark-silz.de/

The Südliche Weinstraße Wildlife Park (German: Wild- und Wanderpark Südliche Weinstraße) is located in the Wasgau, a region on the Franco-German border that forms the southern part of the Palatine Forest and the northern part of the Vosges, near the village of Silz in the south of the state of Rhineland-Palatinate. The park is not named after the German Wine Route which passes about 6 kilometres away, but after the county of Südliche Weinstraße (literally "Southern Wine Road"). The tourist attraction receives about 100,000 visitors annually.

== Location ==
The park, which is part of the Franco-German Palatine Forest-North Vosges Biosphere Reserve, is located in the Klingbach valley and is surrounded by hills. It lies between 200 and 350 metres above sea level and has an area of about 100 hectares. The French border is 12 kilometres away to the south.

== History ==
The park was based on a planning study by the president of the wildlife enclosure section of the International Hunting Association, Heinrich Prinz Reuß. The planning laid particular value on family-oriented amenities and only used land that would otherwise have been abandoned. The then Mayor of Silz, Franz Andelfinger, became involved as the Oberamtsrat at the Südliche Weinstraße county council aiming to unite professional expertise and municipal requirements and to locate the wildlife and walking park in the parish of Silz.

The park was officially handed on 18 April 1975 by the then Minister for Transport and the Economy for Rhineland-Palatinate, Heinrich Holkenbrink.

== Features ==
=== Species ===
15 different species of larger animal live here, totally about 400 individuals. Some of them can be seen in the open. Mammals include European bison, red and fallow deer, mouflon, wild boar, wolf, red fox, Arctic fox and ferrets. In the aviaries are Snowy owls and Eagle owls; in addition, there are two duck ponds.

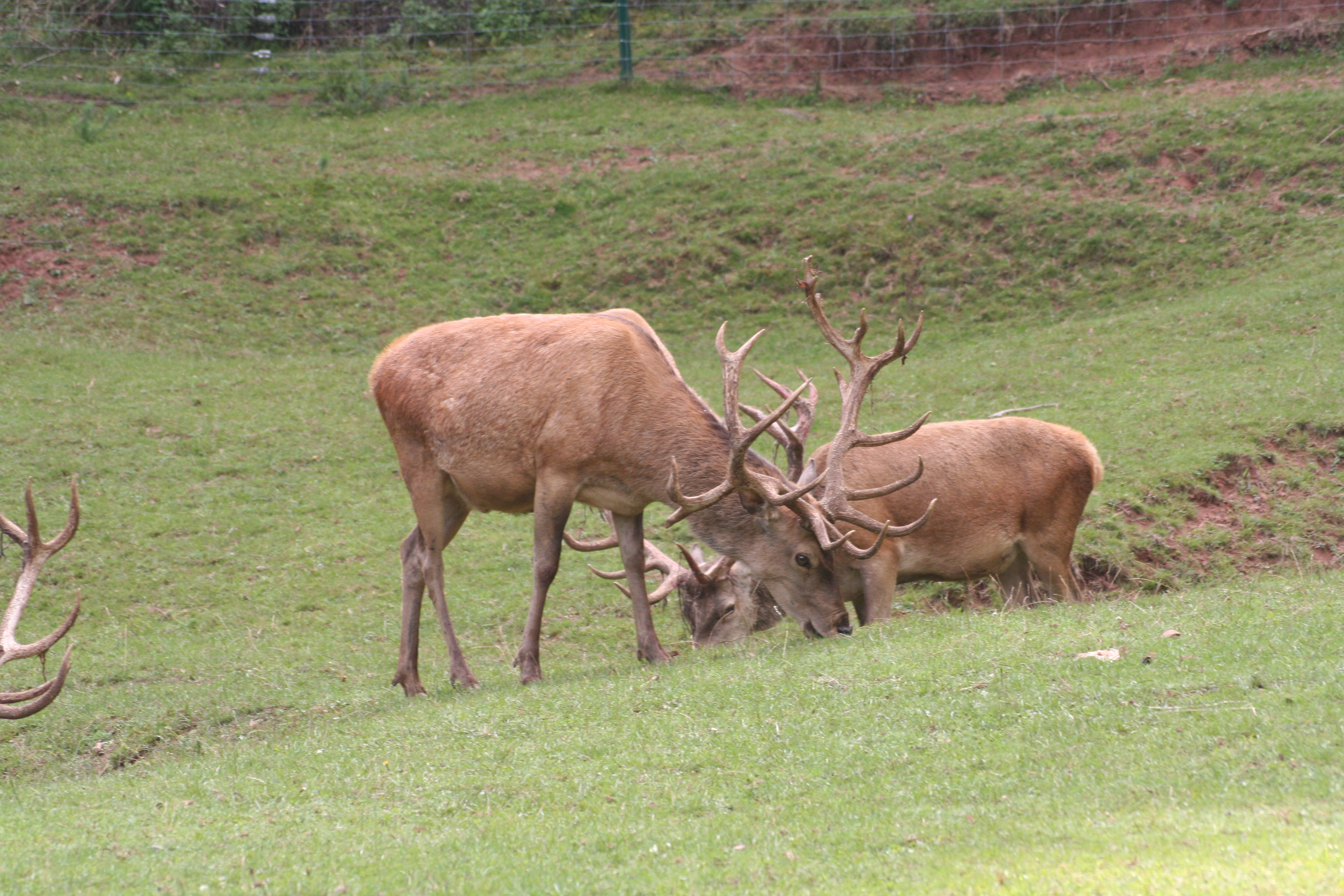
Red deer

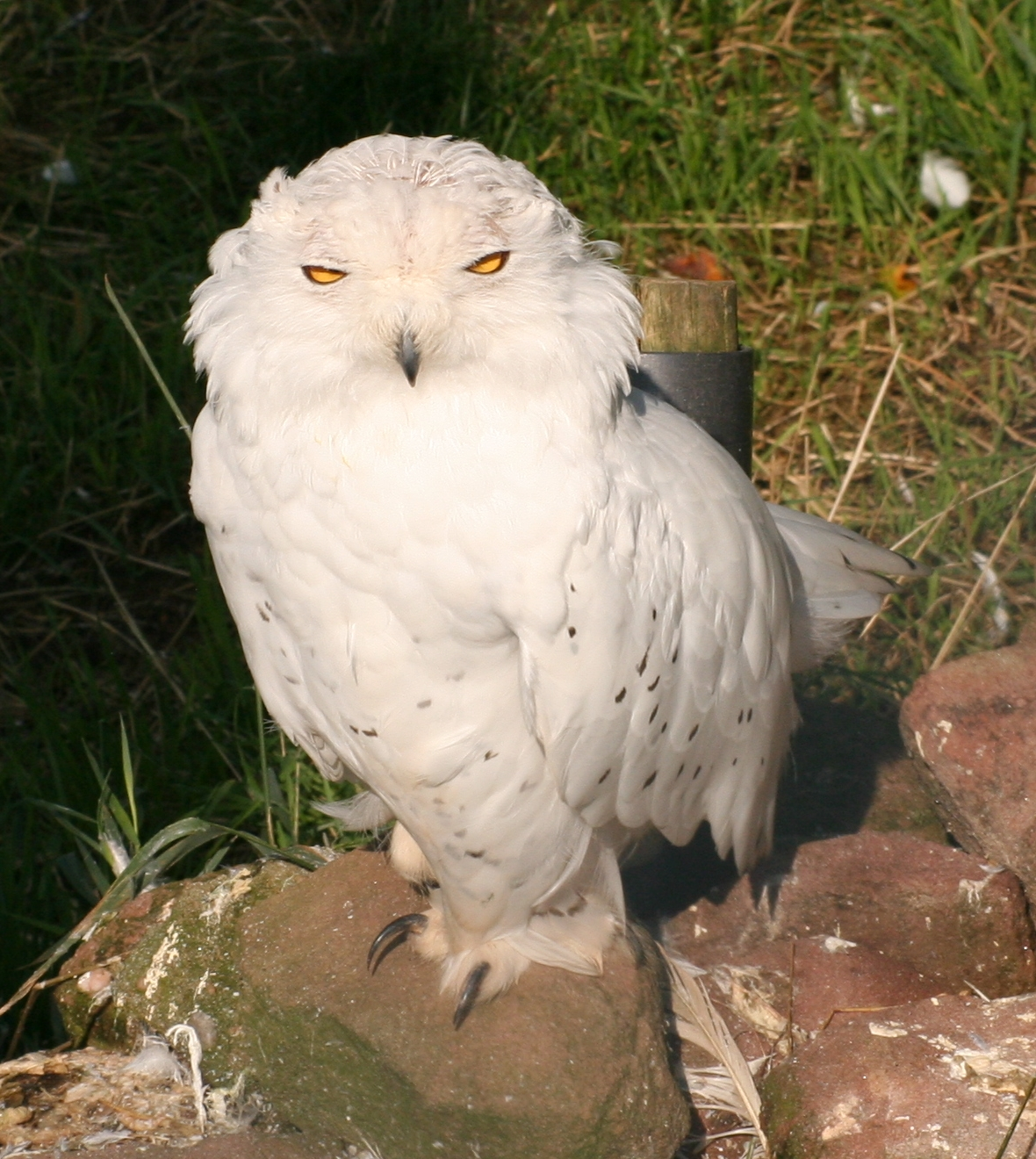
Snowy owl

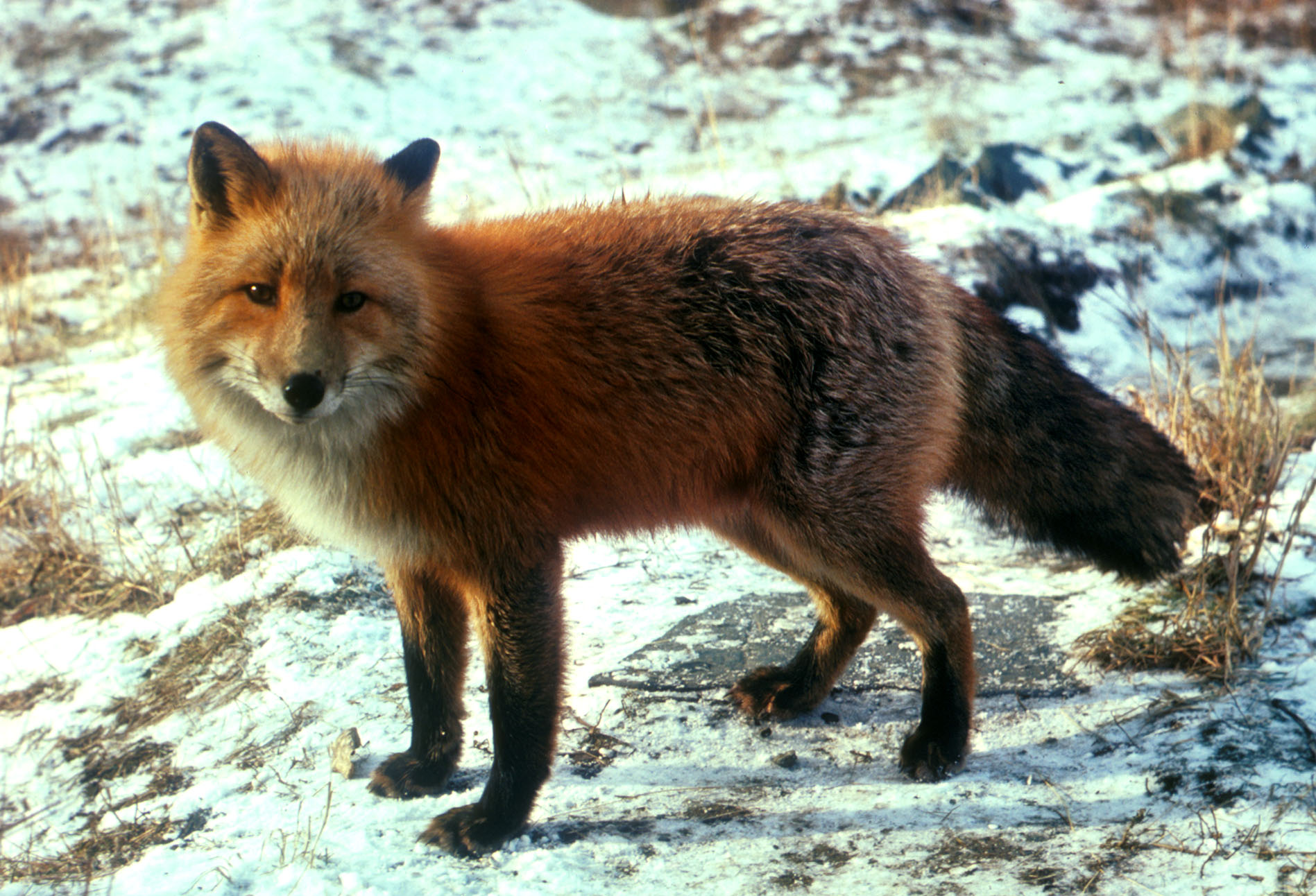
Red fox

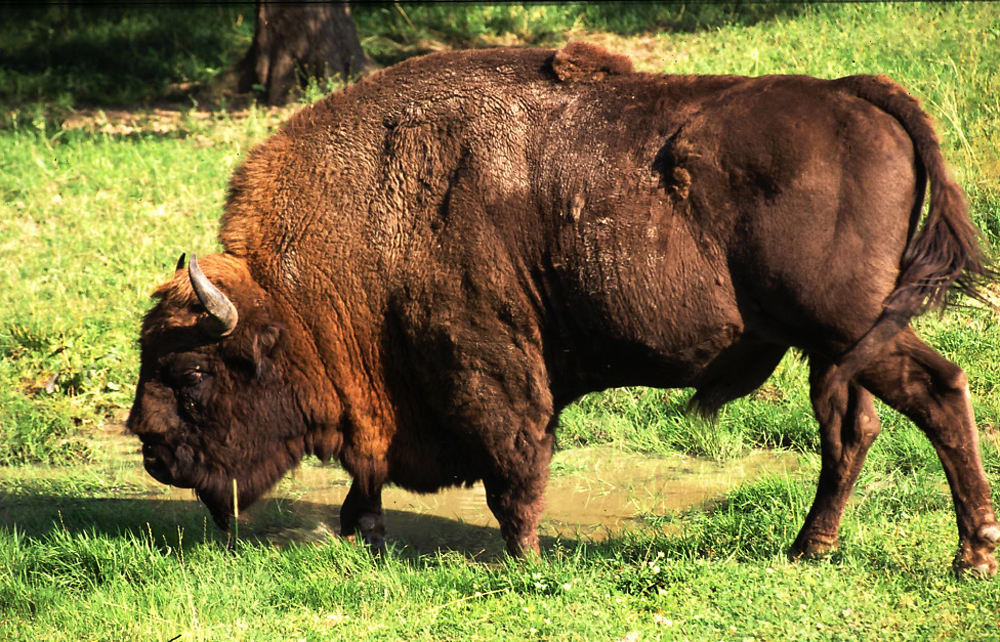
European bison

=== Facilities ===
As well as a restaurant, kiosk und barbecue hut there is an observation tower, a petting zoo, a children's play park and an adventure play area. The "short circular path" (kleine Rundweg) takes about an hour, the "long" walk about two hours. There are no significant steep sections. Branching paths are sometimes steeper and not suitable for wheelchairs, prams or pushchairs.
