= Münchweiler am Klingbach =

- Municipality
- Coat of arms

- Location of Münchweiler am Klingbach within Südliche Weinstraße district
- Interactive map of Münchweiler am Klingbach
- Location within Germany Location within Rhineland-Palatinate
- Coordinates: 49°08′58″N 7°58′18″E
- Country: Germany
- State: Rhineland-Palatinate
- District: Südliche Weinstraße
- Municipal assoc.: Annweiler am Trifels

Government
  - Mayor (2019–24): Hans=Peter Carius

Area
  - Total: 2.14 km^{2} (0.83 sq mi)
- Elevation: 273 m (896 ft)

Population (2025-12-31)
  - Total: 215
  - Density: 100/km^{2} (260/sq mi)
- Time zone: UTC+01:00 (CET)
  - Summer (DST): UTC+02:00 (CEST)
- Postal codes: 76857
- Dialling codes: 06346
- Vehicle registration: SÜW
- Website: www.vg-annweiler.de

Münchweiler am Klingbach (German pronunciation: [ˈmʏnçvaɪlɐ ʔam ˈklɪŋbax], lit. 'Münchweiler on the Klingbach') is a municipality in Südliche Weinstraße district, in Rhineland-Palatinate, western Germany.
