= Rülzheim (Verbandsgemeinde) =

- Verbandsgemeinde
- Location of Rülzheim within Germersheim district
- Interactive map of Rülzheim
- Location within Germany Location within Rhineland-Palatinate
- Coordinates: 49°09′N 8°18′E
- Country: Germany
- State: Rhineland-Palatinate
- District: Germersheim
- Seat: Rülzheim
- Subdivisions: 4 municipalities

Area
  - Total: 52.98 km^{2} (20.46 sq mi)

Population (2025-12-31)
  - Total: 15,712
  - Density: 296.6/km^{2} (768.1/sq mi)
- Time zone: UTC+01:00 (CET)
  - Summer (DST): UTC+02:00 (CEST)
- Website: www.ruelzheim.de

Rülzheim is a Verbandsgemeinde ("collective municipality") in the district of Germersheim, Rhineland-Palatinate, Germany. The seat of the Verbandsgemeinde is in Rülzheim.

The Verbandsgemeinde Rülzheim consists of the following Ortsgemeinden ("local municipalities"):

- Hördt
- Kuhardt
- Leimersheim
- Rülzheim
