= Kunhardt =

Kunhardt is a surname. Notable people with the surname include:

- Dorothy Kunhardt (1901–1979), American children's book author
- Erich E. Kunhardt (1949–2014), Dominican American physicist
- Peter Kunhardt, American documentary film director
- Peter W. Kunhardt Jr., American arts administrator

== See also ==
- Kuhardt
