= Insheim =

- Municipality
- Coat of arms

- Location of Insheim within Südliche Weinstraße district
- Interactive map of Insheim
- Location within Germany Location within Rhineland-Palatinate
- Coordinates: 49°09′55″N 8°08′50″E
- Country: Germany
- State: Rhineland-Palatinate
- District: Südliche Weinstraße
- Municipal assoc.: Herxheim

Government
  - Mayor (2019–24): Martin Baumstark (CDU)

Area
  - Total: 8 km^{2} (3.1 sq mi)
- Elevation: 149 m (489 ft)

Population (2025-12-31)
  - Total: 2,193
  - Density: 270/km^{2} (710/sq mi)
- Time zone: UTC+01:00 (CET)
  - Summer (DST): UTC+02:00 (CEST)
- Postal codes: 76865
- Dialling codes: 06341
- Vehicle registration: SÜW
- Website: www.insheim.de

Insheim (German pronunciation: [ˈɪnshaɪm]) is a municipality in the Verbandsgemeinde Herxheim in the Südliche Weinstraße district in Rhineland-Palatinate.

== Geography ==
Insheim is a part of the Südpfalz. The township belongs to the Verbandsgemeinde Herxheim. Next to Insheim are - clockwise - Landau in der Pfalz, Herxheim bei Landau/Pfalz, Erlenbach bei Kandel, Steinweiler, Rohrbach (Pfalz) and Impflingen.

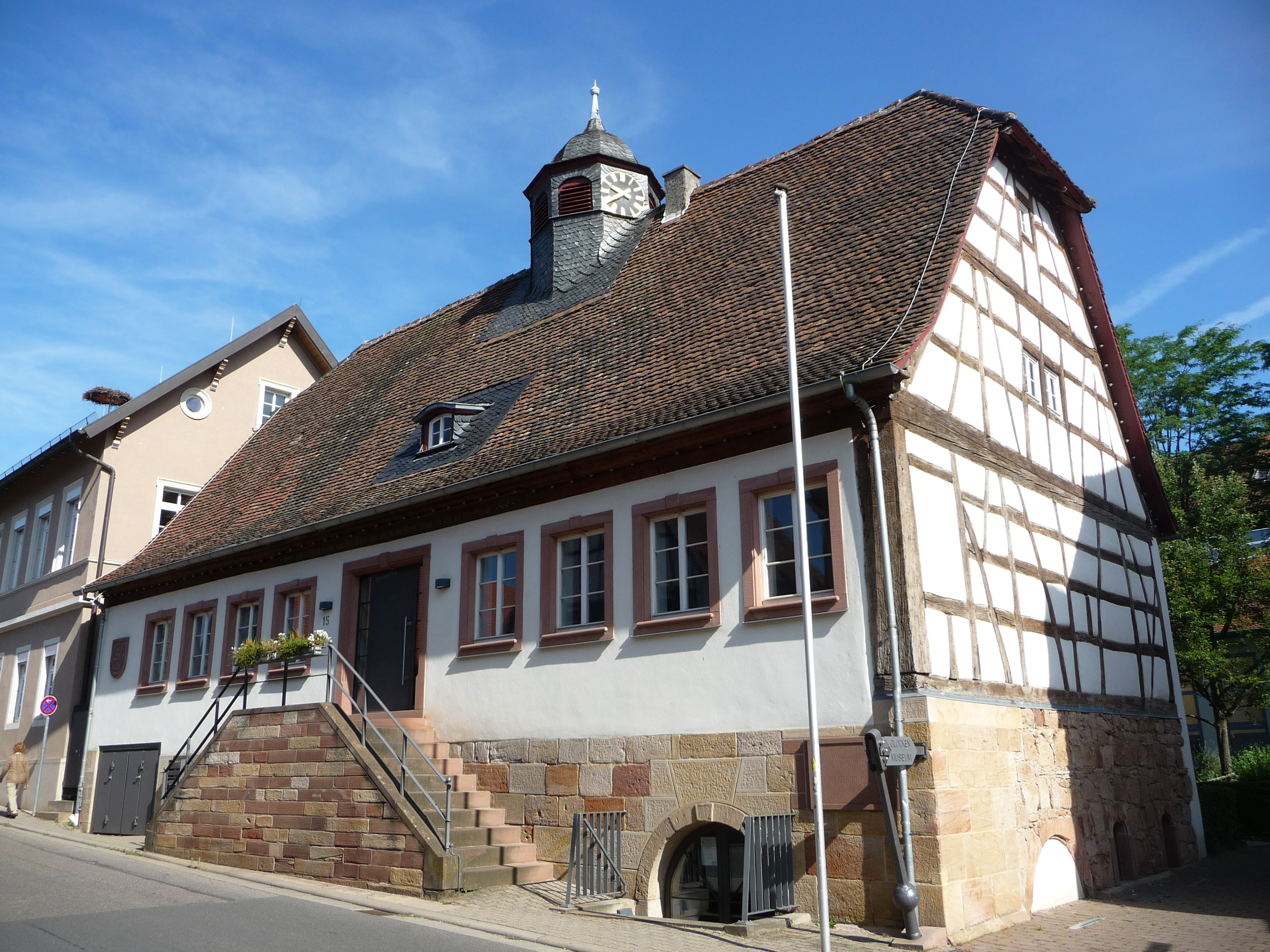
Town hall Insheim
