= Kuhardt =

- Municipality
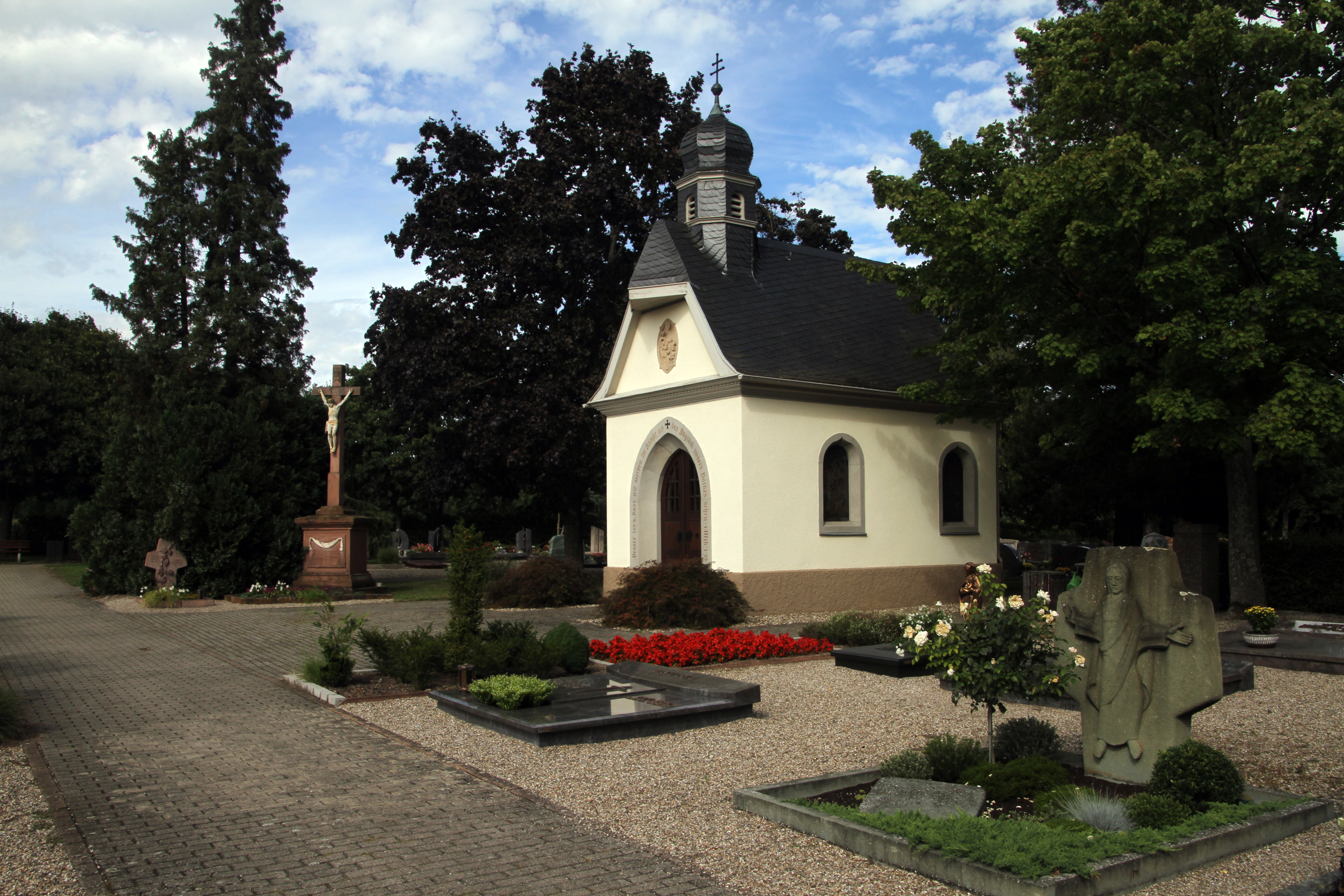

- Coat of arms

- Location of Kuhardt within Germersheim district
- Interactive map of Kuhardt
- Location within Germany Location within Rhineland-Palatinate
- Coordinates: 49°8′47″N 8°18′45″E
- Country: Germany
- State: Rhineland-Palatinate
- District: Germersheim
- Municipal assoc.: Rülzheim

Government
  - Mayor (2019–24): Christian Schwab (CDU)

Area
  - Total: 4.88 km^{2} (1.88 sq mi)
- Elevation: 110 m (360 ft)

Population (2025-12-31)
  - Total: 1,917
  - Density: 393/km^{2} (1,020/sq mi)
- Time zone: UTC+01:00 (CET)
  - Summer (DST): UTC+02:00 (CEST)
- Postal codes: 76773
- Dialling codes: 07272
- Vehicle registration: GER
- Website: www.kuhardt.de

Kuhardt is a municipality in the district of Germersheim, in Rhineland-Palatinate, Germany.

== See also ==
- Kunhardt (disambiguation)
