= Herxheimweyher =

- Municipality
- Coat of arms

- Location of Herxheimweyher within Südliche Weinstraße district
- Interactive map of Herxheimweyher
- Location within Germany Location within Rhineland-Palatinate
- Coordinates: 49°09′09″N 8°15′25″E
- Country: Germany
- State: Rhineland-Palatinate
- District: Südliche Weinstraße
- Municipal assoc.: Herxheim

Government
  - Mayor (2019–24): Markus Müller (CDU)

Area
  - Total: 3.57 km^{2} (1.38 sq mi)
- Elevation: 118 m (387 ft)

Population (2025-12-31)
  - Total: 576
  - Density: 161/km^{2} (418/sq mi)
- Time zone: UTC+01:00 (CET)
  - Summer (DST): UTC+02:00 (CEST)
- Postal codes: 76863
- Dialling codes: 07276
- Vehicle registration: SÜW
- Website: www.herxheimweyher.de

Herxheimweyher is a municipality in Südliche Weinstraße district, in Rhineland-Palatinate, western Germany.
