= Herxheim (Verbandsgemeinde) =

- Verbandsgemeinde
- Location of Herxheim within Südliche Weinstraße district
- Interactive map of Herxheim
- Location within Germany Location within Rhineland-Palatinate
- Coordinates: 49°09′N 8°13′E
- Country: Germany
- State: Rhineland-Palatinate
- District: Südliche Weinstraße
- Seat: Herxheim bei Landau/Pfalz
- Subdivisions: 4 municipalities

Area
  - Total: 49.95 km^{2} (19.29 sq mi)

Population (2025-12-31)
  - Total: 15,621
  - Density: 312.7/km^{2} (810.0/sq mi)
- Time zone: UTC+01:00 (CET)
  - Summer (DST): UTC+02:00 (CEST)
- Website: www.vg-herxheim.de

Herxheim is a Verbandsgemeinde ("collective municipality") in the Südliche Weinstraße district, in Rhineland-Palatinate, Germany. The seat of the municipality is in Herxheim bei Landau/Pfalz.

== Municipalities ==
The Verbandsgemeinde Herxheim consists of the following Ortsgemeinden ("local municipalities"):

1. Herxheim bei Landau/Pfalz
2. Herxheimweyher
3. Insheim
4. Rohrbach
