= Silz, Rhineland-Palatinate =

Silz
- Municipality
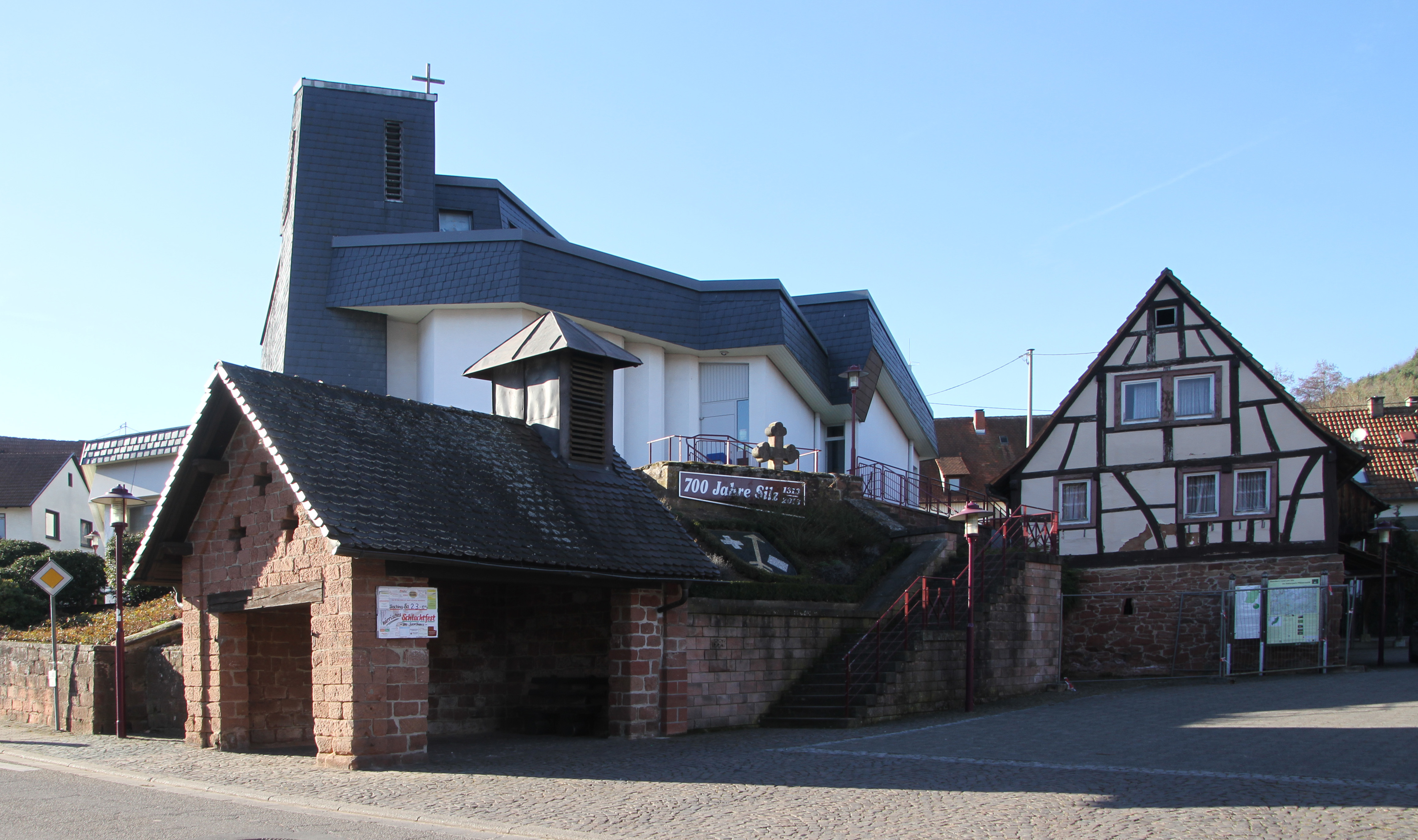

- Coat of arms

- Location of Silz within Südliche Weinstraße district
- Interactive map of Silz
- Location within Germany Location within Rhineland-Palatinate
- Coordinates: 49°08′51″N 7°57′05″E
- Country: Germany
- State: Rhineland-Palatinate
- District: Südliche Weinstraße
- Municipal assoc.: Annweiler am Trifels

Government
  - Mayor (2019–24): Elke Mandery

Area
  - Total: 8.51 km^{2} (3.29 sq mi)
- Elevation: 216 m (709 ft)

Population (2025-12-31)
  - Total: 697
  - Density: 81.9/km^{2} (212/sq mi)
- Time zone: UTC+01:00 (CET)
  - Summer (DST): UTC+02:00 (CEST)
- Postal codes: 76857
- Dialling codes: 06346
- Vehicle registration: SÜW
- Website: www.silz.de

Silz (German pronunciation: [zɪlts]) is a municipality in Südliche Weinstraße district, in Rhineland-Palatinate, western Germany.

Silz is home to the Südliche Weinstraße Wildlife Park which attracts about 100,000 visitors a year.
