= Rohrbach, Palatinate =

Rohrbach
- Municipality
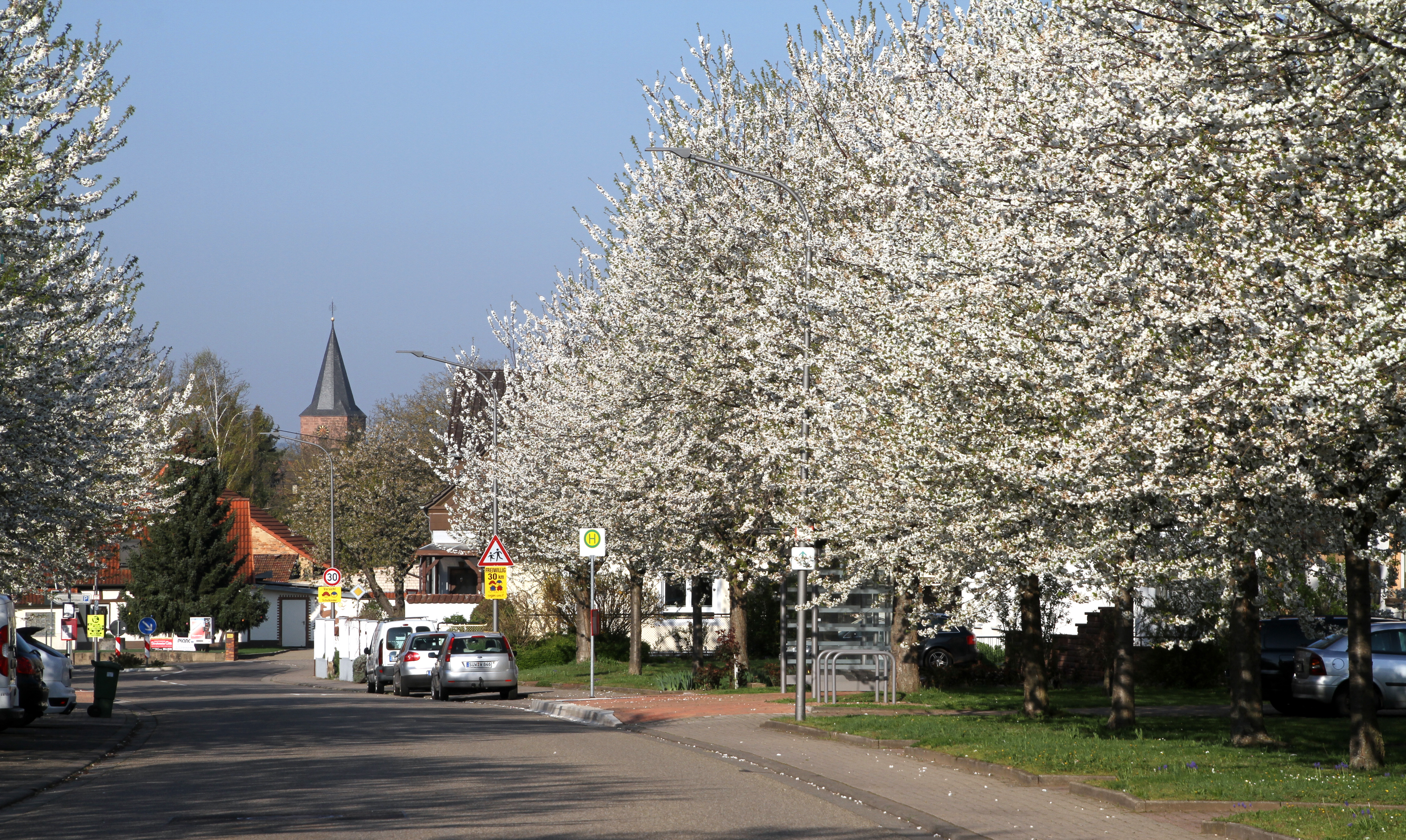

- Coat of arms

- Location of Rohrbach within Südliche Weinstraße district
- Interactive map of Rohrbach
- Location within Germany Location within Rhineland-Palatinate
- Coordinates: 49°08′21″N 8°07′57″E
- Country: Germany
- State: Rhineland-Palatinate
- District: Südliche Weinstraße
- Municipal assoc.: Herxheim

Government
  - Mayor (2019–24): Thomas Kienzler (FW)

Area
  - Total: 9.25 km^{2} (3.57 sq mi)
- Elevation: 139 m (456 ft)

Population (2025-12-31)
  - Total: 1,811
  - Density: 196/km^{2} (507/sq mi)
- Time zone: UTC+01:00 (CET)
  - Summer (DST): UTC+02:00 (CEST)
- Postal codes: 76865
- Dialling codes: 06349
- Vehicle registration: SÜW
- Website: www.Rohrbach-Pfalz.de

Rohrbach (German pronunciation: [ˈʁoːɐ̯bax]) is a municipality in Südliche Weinstraße district, in Rhineland-Palatinate, western Germany.
