= Hördt =

- Municipality
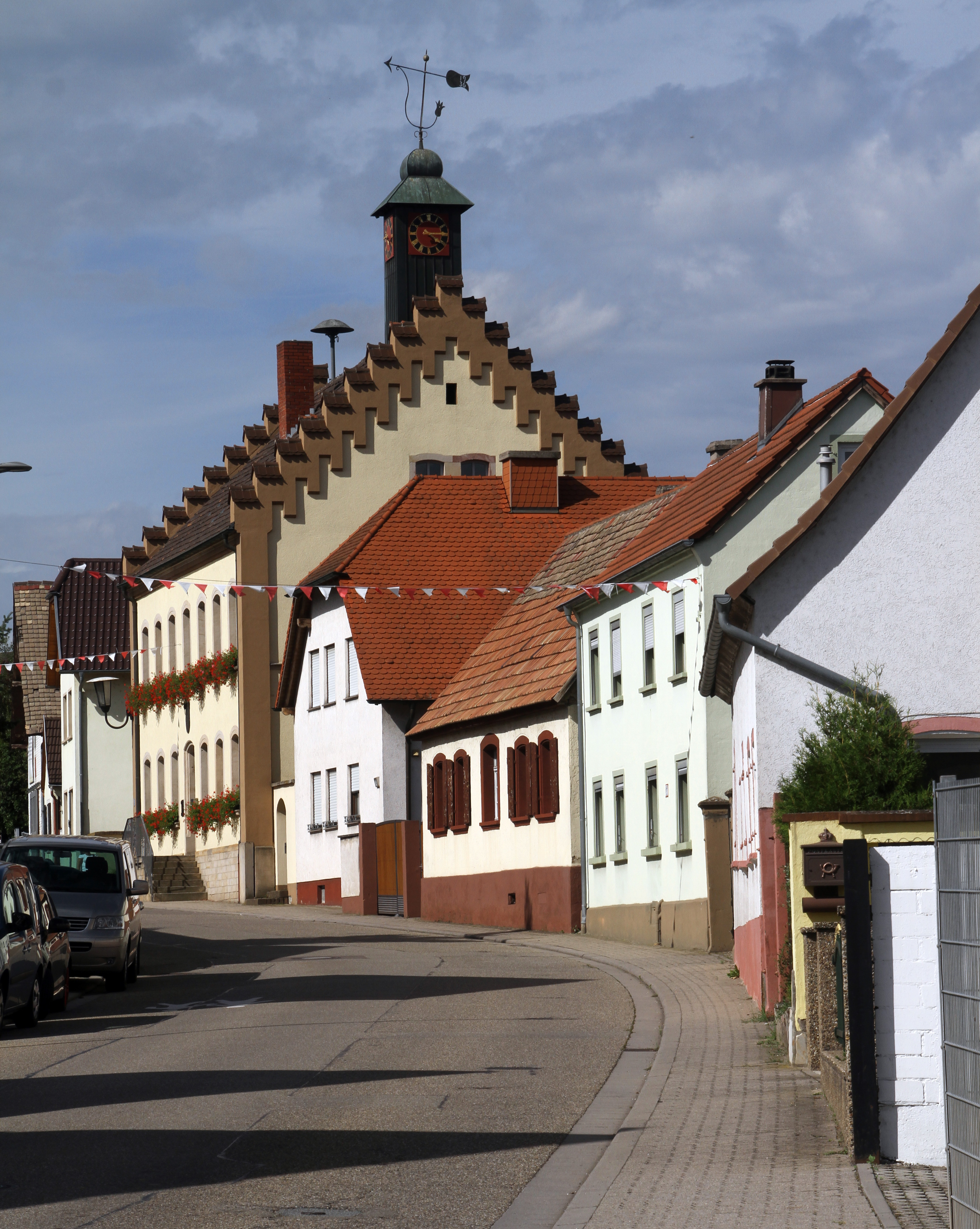

- Coat of arms

- Location of Hördt within Germersheim district
- Interactive map of Hördt
- Location within Germany Location within Rhineland-Palatinate
- Coordinates: 49°09′56″N 08°19′35″E
- Country: Germany
- State: Rhineland-Palatinate
- District: Germersheim
- Municipal assoc.: Rülzheim

Government
  - Mayor (2019–24): Max Frey (CDU)

Area
  - Total: 18.47 km^{2} (7.13 sq mi)
- Elevation: 99 m (325 ft)

Population (2025-12-31)
  - Total: 2,730
  - Density: 148/km^{2} (383/sq mi)
- Time zone: UTC+01:00 (CET)
  - Summer (DST): UTC+02:00 (CEST)
- Postal codes: 76771
- Dialling codes: 07272
- Vehicle registration: GER
- Website: www.hoerdt-pfalz.de

Hördt (German pronunciation: [hœʁt]) is a municipality in the district of Germersheim, in Rhineland-Palatinate, Germany.

== Personalities ==
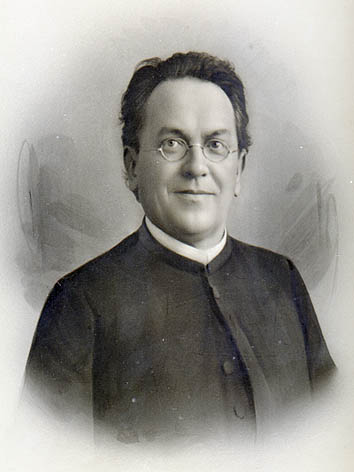
Jakob Baumann (1900)

- Jakob Baumann (1862-1922), cathedral vicar in Speyer, author, long-standing editor of the diocese newspaper "Der Pilger"
- Franz Hamburger (born 1946), social pedagogue

== Personalities who have worked on the ground ==
- Andreas Helmling (born 1959), sculptor, created the "Stifterskulptur" on the roundabout in 2005.
