= Leimersheim =

- Municipality
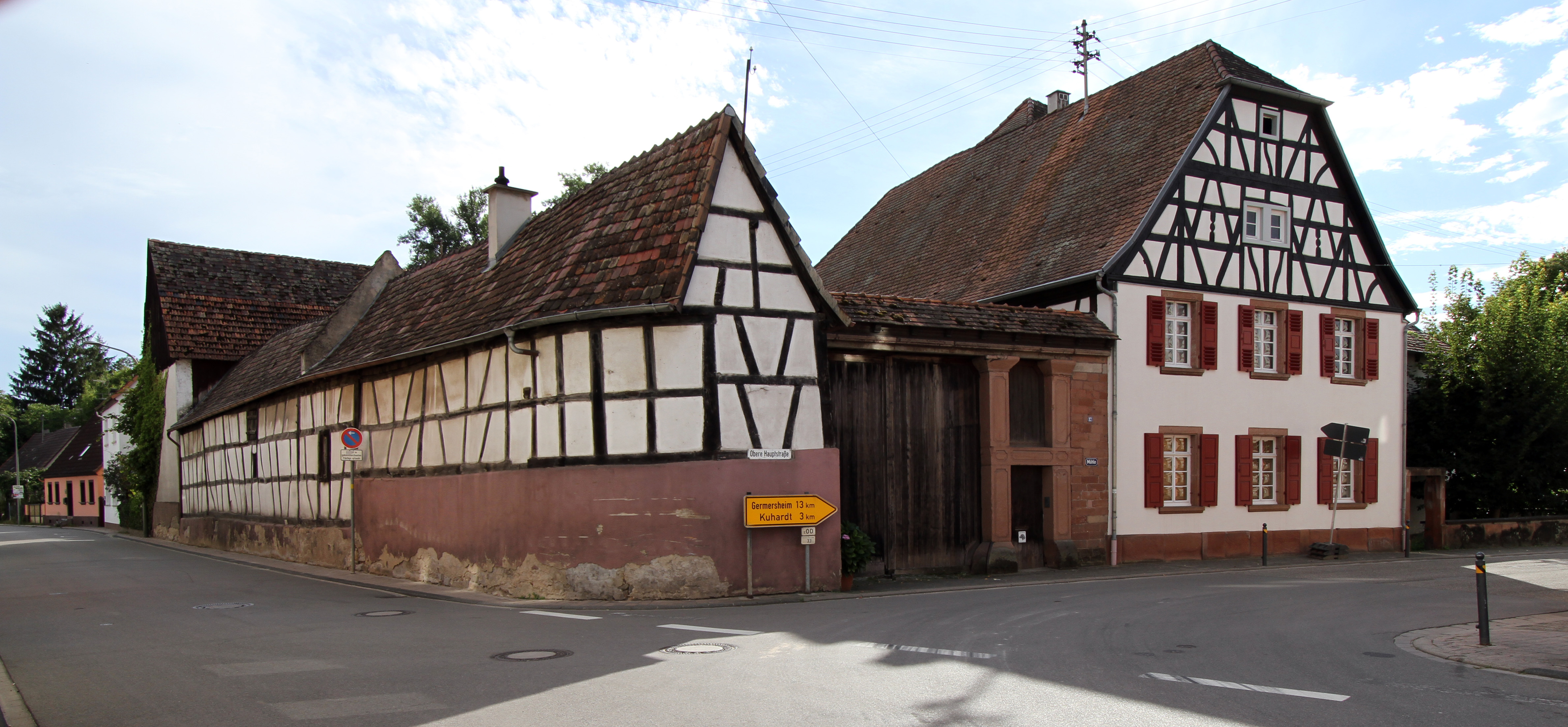

- Coat of arms

- Location of Leimersheim within Germersheim district
- Interactive map of Leimersheim
- Location within Germany Location within Rhineland-Palatinate
- Coordinates: 49°7′21″N 8°20′36″E
- Country: Germany
- State: Rhineland-Palatinate
- District: Germersheim
- Municipal assoc.: Rülzheim

Government
  - Mayor (2019–24): Matthias Schardt (CDU)

Area
  - Total: 12.97 km^{2} (5.01 sq mi)
- Elevation: 105 m (344 ft)

Population (2025-12-31)
  - Total: 2,609
  - Density: 201.2/km^{2} (521.0/sq mi)
- Time zone: UTC+01:00 (CET)
  - Summer (DST): UTC+02:00 (CEST)
- Postal codes: 76774
- Dialling codes: 07272
- Vehicle registration: GER
- Website: www.leimersheim.de

Leimersheim is a municipality in the district of Germersheim, in Rhineland-Palatinate, Germany.

== History ==
In the early 18th century, there were two Jewish families living in Leimersheim, and by the early 19th century, there were ten families. By 1880, there were 118 Jewish people living in Leimersheim, which eventually went down to 26 by 1932 before the beginning of World War II.

== Famous people ==
- Reinhard Liebel (1841-1905), businessman and politician from Erie, Pennsylvania; born in Leimersheim.
