= Rülzheim =

- Municipality
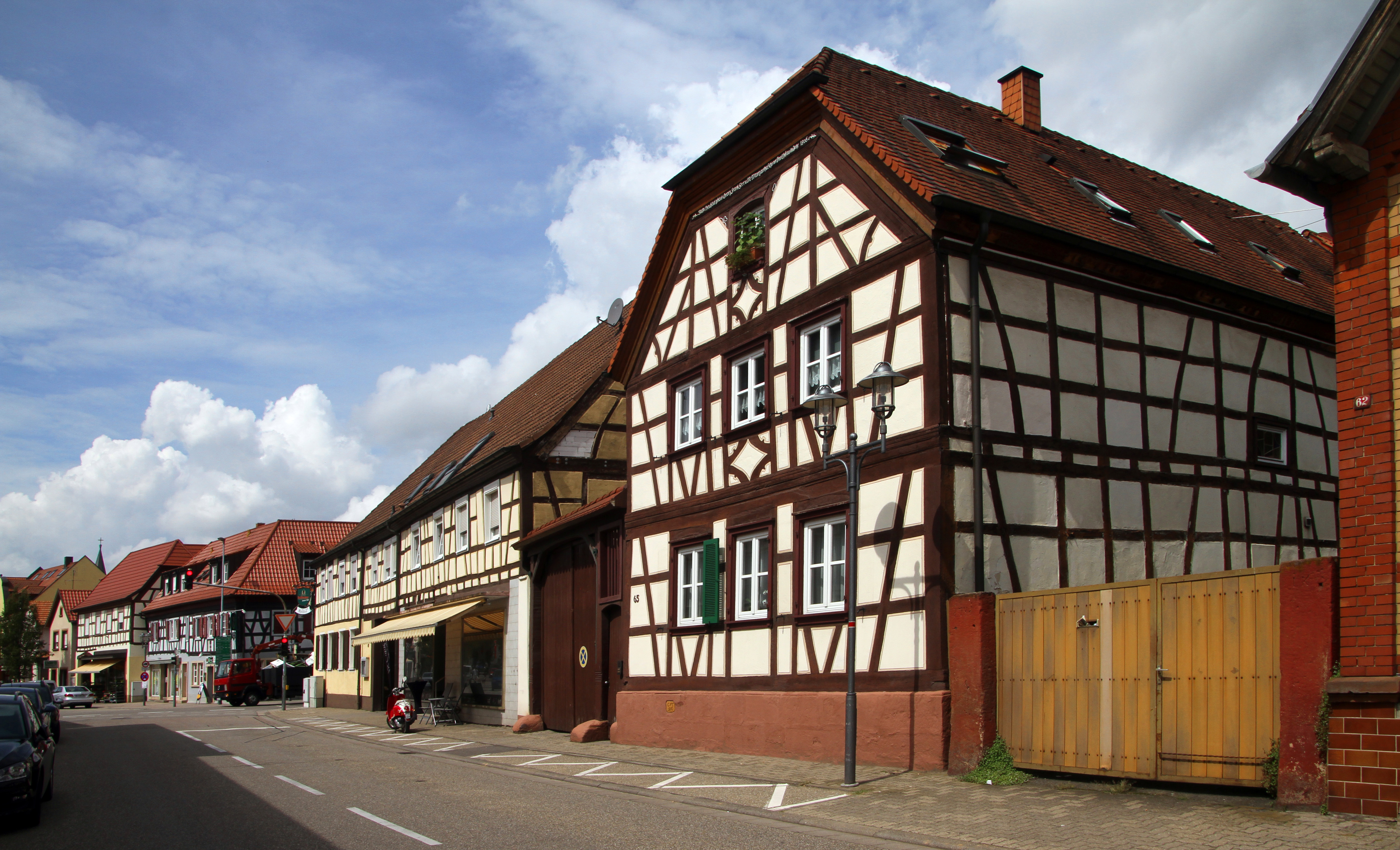

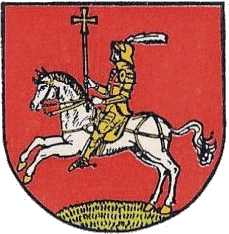
- Coat of arms

- Location of Rülzheim within Germersheim district
- Interactive map of Rülzheim
- Location within Germany Location within Rhineland-Palatinate
- Coordinates: 49°9′20″N 8°17′37″E
- Country: Germany
- State: Rhineland-Palatinate
- District: Germersheim
- Municipal assoc.: Rülzheim

Government
  - Mayor (2019–24): Reiner Hör

Area
  - Total: 16.66 km^{2} (6.43 sq mi)
- Elevation: 110 m (360 ft)

Population (2025-12-31)
  - Total: 8,456
  - Density: 507.6/km^{2} (1,315/sq mi)
- Time zone: UTC+01:00 (CET)
  - Summer (DST): UTC+02:00 (CEST)
- Postal codes: 76761
- Dialling codes: 07272
- Vehicle registration: GER
- Website: www.ruelzheim.de

Rülzheim is a municipality in the district of Germersheim, in Rhineland-Palatinate, Germany. It is situated approximately 10 km south-west of Germersheim.

Rülzheim is the seat of the Verbandsgemeinde ("collective municipality") Rülzheim. Rülzheim station is on Schifferstadt–Wörth railway and is served by the Karlsruhe Stadtbahn.
