= Breitenbach (Speyerbach) =

River in Germany

- The Breitenbach near Esthal

Location
- Country: Germany
- State: Rhineland-Palatinate
- Reference no.: DE: 237834

Physical characteristics
- Source
  - location: in the Dreibrunnental valley in the central Palatine Forest
  - coordinates: 49°23′26″N 7°58′22″E
  - elevation: 336 m above sea level (NN)
- Mouth
  - location: near Breitenstein into the Speyerbach
  - coordinates: 49°20′42″N 8°00′07″E
  - elevation: 194 m above sea level (NN)
- Length: 6.74 km
- Basin size: 13.228 km^{2}

Basin features
- Progression: Speyerbach→ Rhine→ North Sea

Breitenbach (German pronunciation: [ˈbʁaɪtn̩bax]) is a river of Rhineland-Palatinate, Germany, a left tributary of the Speyerbach.

The Breitenbach rises in the central Palatine Forest in the valley of Dreibrunnental ("Three Springs Valley") and flows towards the south, where it forms the parish boundary between Elmstein and Esthal almost throughout. On the way it passes the Goldbrunnen spring. After about 10 kilometres it empties into the Speyerbach at the hamlet of Breitenstein (belongs to Esthal). The timber rafting station there is classed as a cultural monument; in the immediate vicinity of the confluence are the ruins of Breitenstein Castle.

== Tributaries ==
- Finster-Breitenbach (right), 1.3 km
- Großer Schwabenbach (right), 1.7 km
