= Mußbach =

Stream in Germany

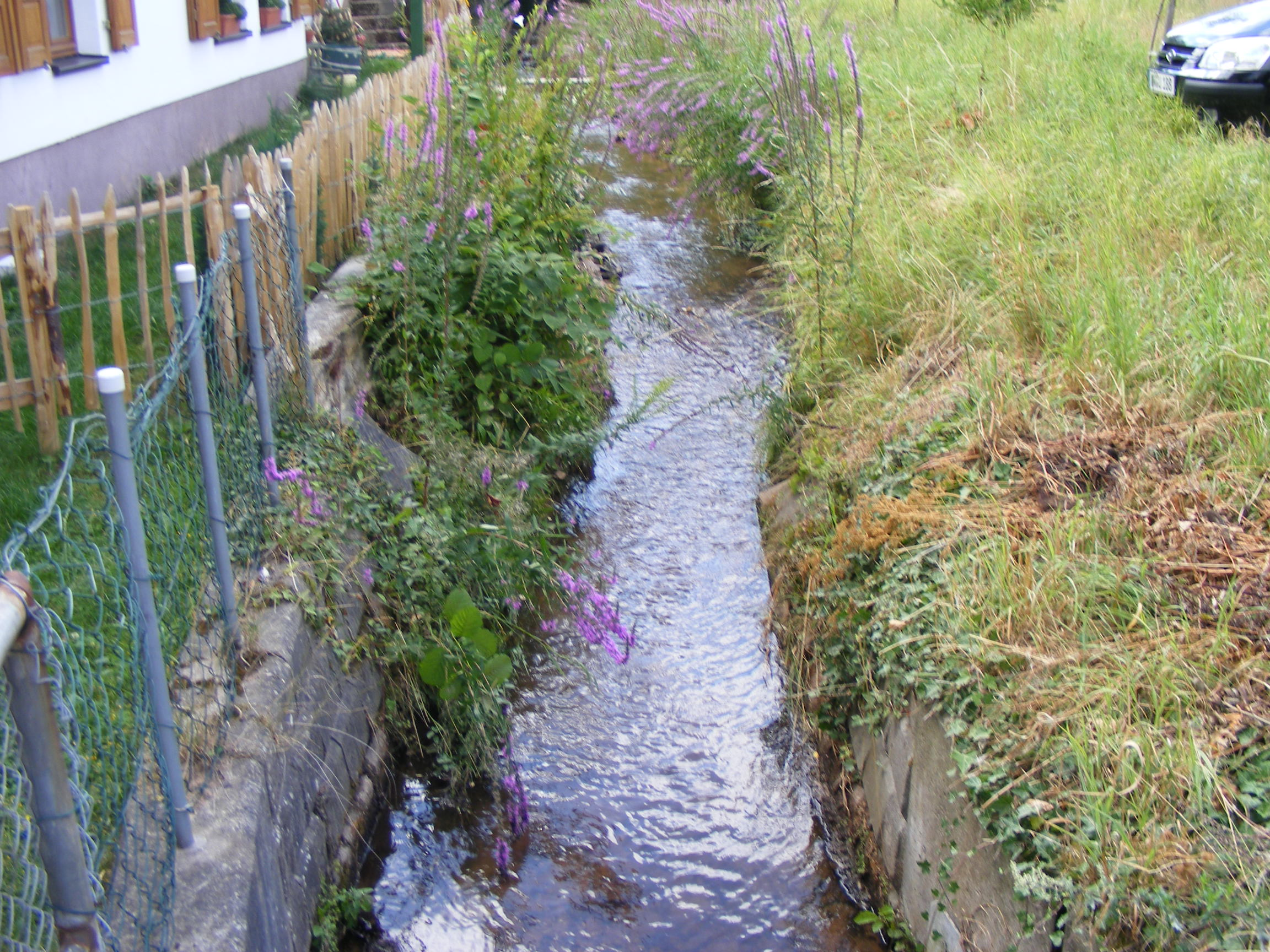
- The Mußbach on the southeastern outskirts of Gimmeldingen; on the left the north wall of Wiedemann Mill

Location
- Country: Germany
- State: Rhineland-Palatinate

Physical characteristics
- Source
  - location: Hoher Stoppelkopf
  - coordinates: 49°22′49″N 8°7′26″E
  - elevation: 460 m (1,510 ft)
- Mouth
  - location: Confluence with Rehbach in Neustadt an der Weinstraße
  - coordinates: 49°21′33″N 8°10′59″E
  - elevation: 124 m (407 ft)
- Length: 11.86 km (7.37 mi)
- Basin size: 15.238 km^{2} (5.883 sq mi)

Basin features
- Progression: Rehbach→ Rhine→ North Sea
- Cities: Neustadt an der Weinstrasse, Wachenheim an der Weinstrasse, Deidesheim

The Mußbach is a stream, nearly 12 kilometres (7.5 mi) long, in the eastern Palatinate Forest and in the Anterior Palatinate region in the south of German state of Rhineland-Palatinate. The former village of Mußbach (annexed by Neustadt an der Weinstrasse in 1969) was named after it.

== Course ==
The two springs of the Mußbach rise a few hundred metres apart on the northeastern slope of the Hoher Stoppelkopf (567 metres) in the forest district of Wachenheim an der Weinstrasse. They converge after about 2 km (1.2 mi). The stream, which usually carries very little water, enters the Silbertal ("Silver Valley") in the forest district of Deidesheim. After 6 km (3.7 mi) it reaches the Neustadt suburb of Gimmeldingen in the Benjental valley. Here, it is joined by an unnamed right tributary. The tributary is only 2 km (1.2 mi) long, but carries much more water. Its origin is the Loosenbrunnen springs on the north flank of the 533-metre-high Weinbiet on the eastern edge of the Palatinate Forest. Between 1952 and 1988, water from the spring was pumped up and used as drinking water in the local bar of Weinbiethaus.

The combined stream feeds a small reservoir serving tourism in the Gimmeldingen Valley and then reaches the vines landscape flanking the German Wine Route. Here, it flows through the Neustadt suburbs of Gimmeldingen and Mußbach. The confluence with the Rehbach, the northern tributary of the Speyerbach, is about 2 km (1.2 mi) southeast of this residential area.

== History ==
=== Name ===
In Middle High German, the stream and the village named after it were called Muosbach, meaning something like swampy brook, because natural streams meander and cause a high groundwater level.

=== Mills ===
In the Middle Ages, the water of the stream was used to drive twelve mills. Their sites are now connected by the Mühlenwanderweg (Mill Trail). Among these are, in downstream order:

- The Upper Mill in Deidesheim, so named because it was the highest of the mills on the Mußbach.
- The building that is now Forsthaus Benjental was once a weapon forge, which used a water wheel to drive the iron hammer.
- The Lower Mill was built in 1718 in the extreme northwest of Gimmeldingen. It was razed in a major fire in 1886.
- The Platsche Mill was built in 1821 and decommissioned in 1900. Only a millstone remains.
- The Talmühle ("Valley Mill") was the best preserved and was converted into a restaurant.
- As early as the Frankish times, a mill existed on the boundary of the former village of Lobloch (annexed by neighbouring Gimmeldingen in 1751, today part of Neustadt an der Weinstraße), south of St Nicholas' Church in Gimmeldingen. Historians believe that the mill once formed the nucleus of the village.
- The Wiedemann Mill at the border between Gimmeldingen and Mußbach remained in operation until the early 20th century and was then turned into a winery. The former mill wheel was last seen in the 1960s.

=== Ecology ===
In the 19th and first half of the 20th century, the stream was used as an open sewer. It is now partially restored, but also partially canalized.

== See also ==
- List of rivers of Rhineland-Palatinate

== References and sources ==
- Eric Metz, Alfred Sitzmann (2008), Die ehemaligen Mahlmühlen am Mußbach, Gimmeldingen – Leben im Weindorf (in German), Neustadt an der Weinstrasse: Reinhard Kermann, Alfred Sitzmann
