= Helmbachweiher =

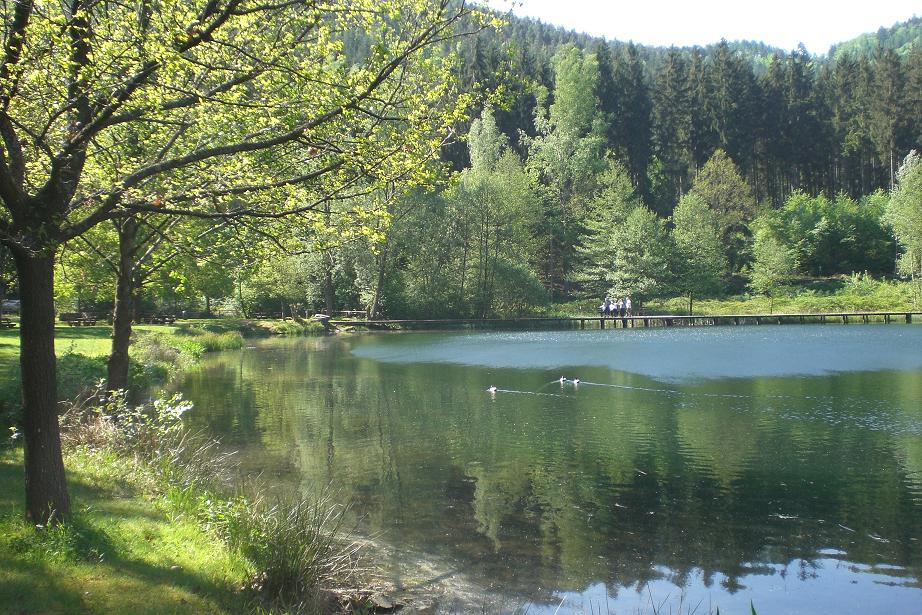
- Helmbachweiher

- Location within Rhineland-Palatinate
- Location: Rhineland-Palatinate, Germany
- Coordinates: 49°20′2″N 7°58′53″E
- Type: lake
- Surface area: 0.6 hectares (1.5 acres)
- Max. depth: 2 metres (6 ft 7 in)

The Helmbachweiher is a lake in the central Palatine Forest in the German state of Rhineland-Palatinate. It lies near the Helmbach stream about two kilometres from its confluence with the Speyerbach on the forest estates of the municipalities of Elmstein, Kirrweiler and Venningen.

The lake is comparable to the woogs of the Middle Ages and was created in 1970 by the impoundment of the Kohlbach, a right tributary of the Helmbach. It has an area of 0.6 hectares (1.5 acres) and is up to 2 metres (6 ft 7 in) deep. Its primary role is as a Kneipp bathing pool. In the immediate vicinity of the lake is a forester's lodge, the Forsthaus Helmbach, an adventure playground, a barbecue area and an educational garten.
