= Helmbach =

Helmbach may refer to:

- Helmbach (Speyerbach), a river of Rhineland-Palatinate, Germany, right tributary of the Speyerbach
- Helmbachweiher, a lake in Rhineland-Palatinate, Germany
