= Blattbach =

River in Germany

Location
- Country: Germany
- State: Rhineland-Palatinate
- Reference no.: DE: 237822

Physical characteristics
- Source
  - location: in the central Palatinate Forest
  - coordinates: 49°19′41″N 7°53′14″E
  - elevation: 402 m above sea level (NN)
- Mouth
  - location: west of the Hofberg into the Helmbach
  - coordinates: 49°19′06″N 7°55′25″E
  - elevation: 270 m above sea level (NN)
- Length: 3.06 km (1.90 mi)
- Basin size: 7.181 km^{2} (2.773 sq mi)

Basin features
- Progression: Helmbach→ Speyerbach→ Rhine→ North Sea

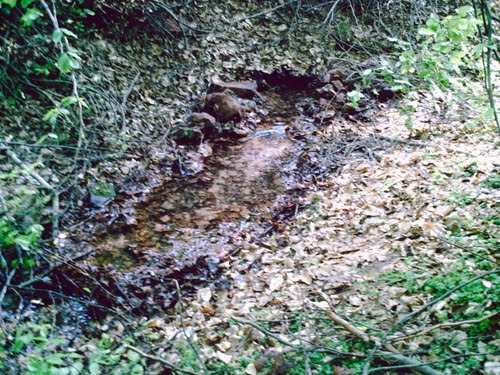
The Blattbach source

The Blattbach is a tributary of the Helmbach, roughly 3 kilometres (2 mi) long, in the Palatinate Forest in the German state of Rhineland-Palatinate. It rises in the central part of the forest and flows eastwards before discharging into the Helmbach. The Blattbach is located entirely within the territory of the municipality of Elmstein.

== Tributaries ==
- Miedersbach (right), 3.45 kilometres (2.14 mi)
