= Hoher Stoppelkopf =

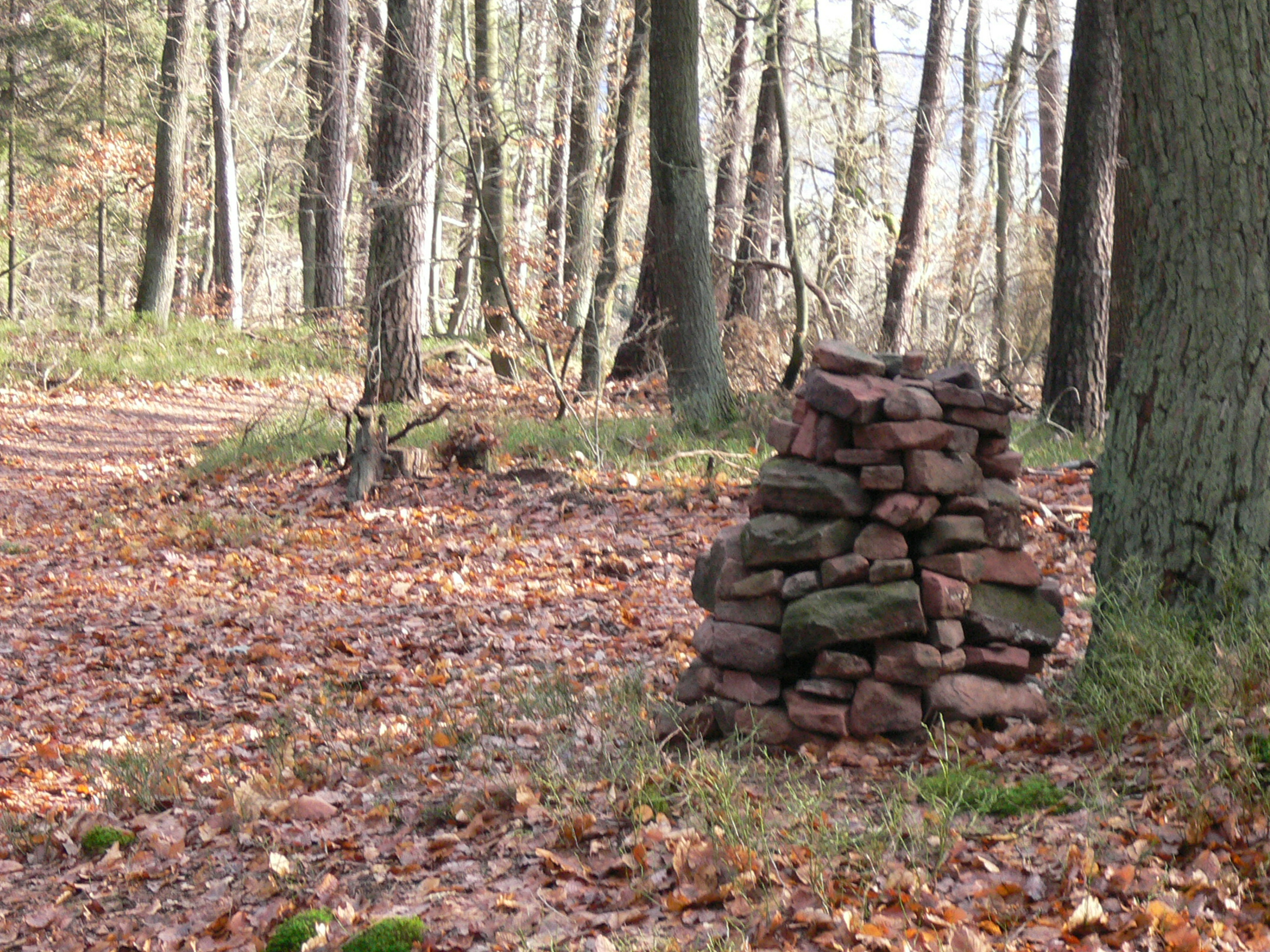
- Wayside cairn marking a track near the Stoppelkopf

Highest point
- Elevation: 566.2 m above sea level (NN) (1,857 ft)
- Coordinates: 49°23′50″N 8°04′25″E

Geography
- Location within Rhineland-Palatinate
- Location: Rhineland-Palatinate, Germany
- Parent range: Palatine Forest

Geology
- Mountain type: Bunter sandstone

The Hohe Stoppelkopf, locally just called the Stoppelkopf, is a 566.2-metre-high hill in the Palatine Forest in the German state of Rhineland-Palatinate. It lies 3 km north of the small town of Lambrecht.

Together with the Drachenfels (577 m) to the northwest and the Stabenberg (496 m) to the east, the Stoppelkopf lies on the watershed between the catchment areas of two Palatine Rhine tributaries, the Speyerbach (south) and the Isenach (north). The two longest tributaries of the Mußbach rise on the Stoppelkopf; both later empty into the left mouth branch of the Speyerbach, the Rehbach.

== Attractions ==
About 110 metres north-northeast of the summit of the Hoher Stoppfelkopf a hunting lodge was built in 1900, the Hermannshütte (also called the Emil Leidner Hut), which is unmanaged. At the top a summit cross was erected in 2003 by the Deidesheim Branch of the Palatine Forest Club. About 2 kilometres (1.2 mi) northeast of the Stoppelkopf lies the deer conservation park, the Kurpfalz Park, which is accessible from Wachenheim on a well-developed tarmac road (8 km).
