= Bergstein (Weinbiet) =

Coordinates: 49°21′28″N 8°07′23″E

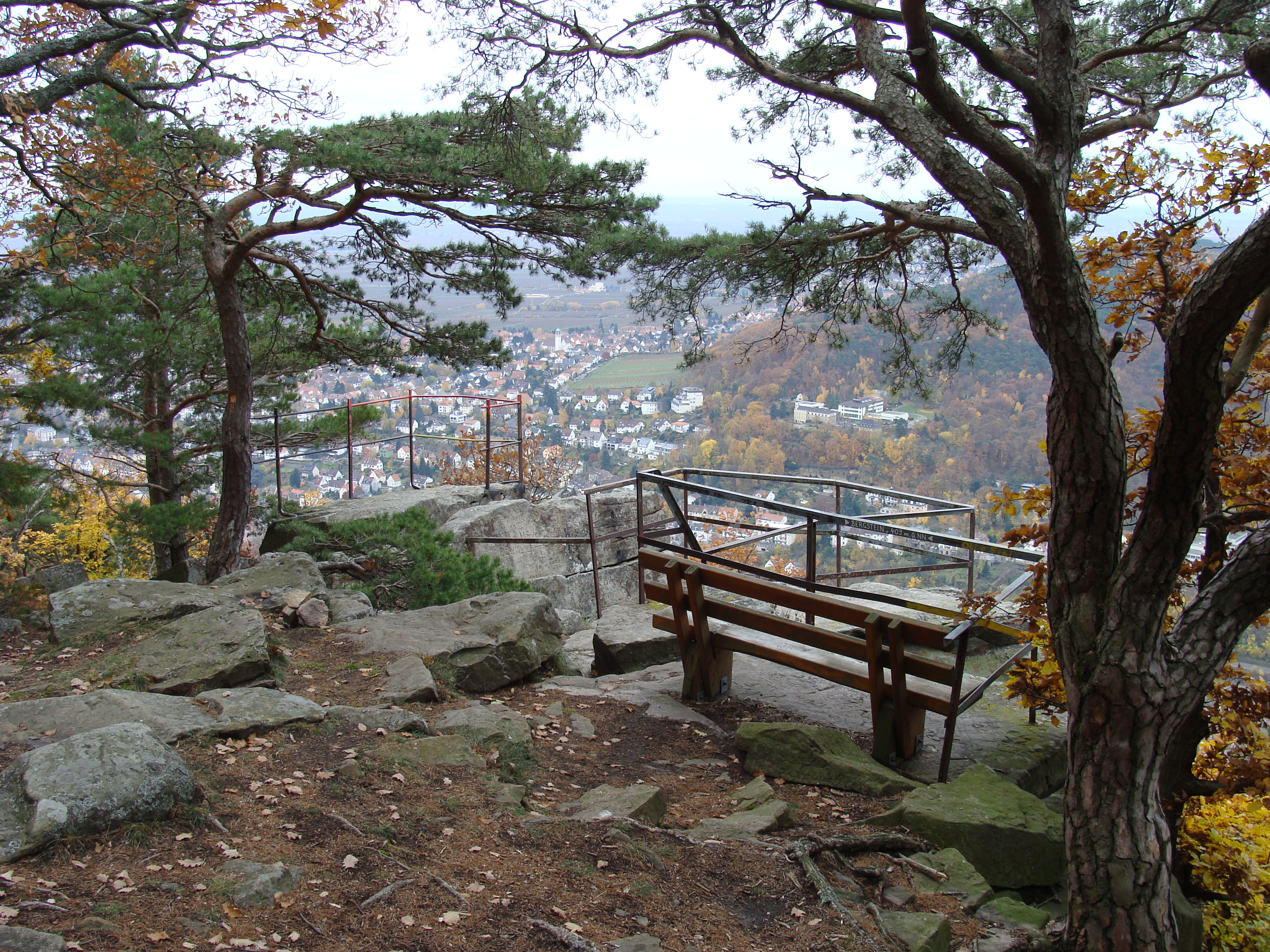
The Bergstein

The Bergstein is a natural monument in the borough of Neustadt an der Weinstraße in the German state of Rhineland-Palatinate. It has the number ND-7316-173.

The Bergstein is described as a rock group and lies at an elevation of c. 354 m (1,161 ft) at the eastern end of the Palatinate Forest and is part of the Weinbiet massif. The Bergstein lies above the Speyerbach valley and has a view of the valley and the town of Neustadt. It is accessible and is protected by railings. It is only accessible on footpaths.
