= Erlenbach (Speyerbach) =

River in Germany

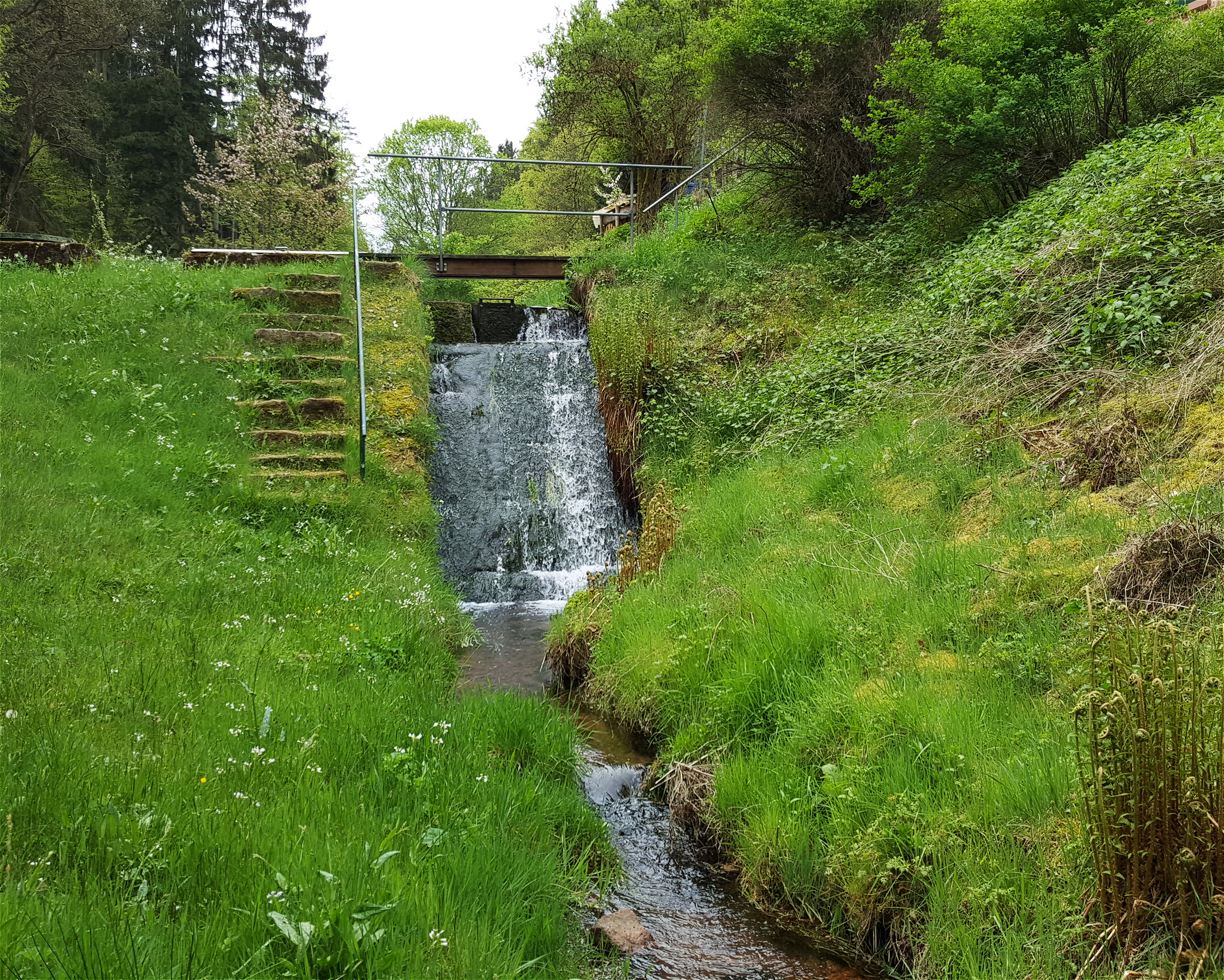
- The Erlenbach in Erlenbach village

Location
- Country: Germany
- State: Rhineland-Palatinate

Physical characteristics
- Source
  - location: At the Eschkopf
  - coordinates: 49°18′45″N 7°50′41″E
  - elevation: 460 m (1,510 ft)
- Mouth
  - location: Confluence with Speyerbach at Speyerbrunn
  - coordinates: 49°20′58″N 7°52′16″E
  - elevation: 295 m (968 ft)
- Length: 5 km (3.1 mi)
- Basin size: 596 km^{2} (230 sq mi)

Basin features
- Progression: Speyerbach→ Rhine→ North Sea

The Erlenbach (German: [ˈɛʁlənbax]) is a river in the Palatinate Forest, in the Palatinate region of Rhineland-Palatinate. It is the strongest headwater of the Speyerbach, which is the largest river in the Anterior Palatinate.

The Erlenbach rises at a height of about 460 m on the eastern slope of the Eschkopf (609 m), hence on the eastern side of the Palatinate watershed.

If flows generally to the north and after only 5 km flows into the Speyerbach shortly after the latter's nominal spring at Speyerbrunn. Hydrologically speaking, the origin of the Erlenbach is the real origin of the Speyerbach.

The distance from the Erlenbach's spring to the Speyerbach's confluence with the Rhine is 60 km. The drainage basin of the Erlenbach/Speyerbach system measures 596 km².

== See also ==
- List of rivers of Rhineland-Palatinate
