= Woog =

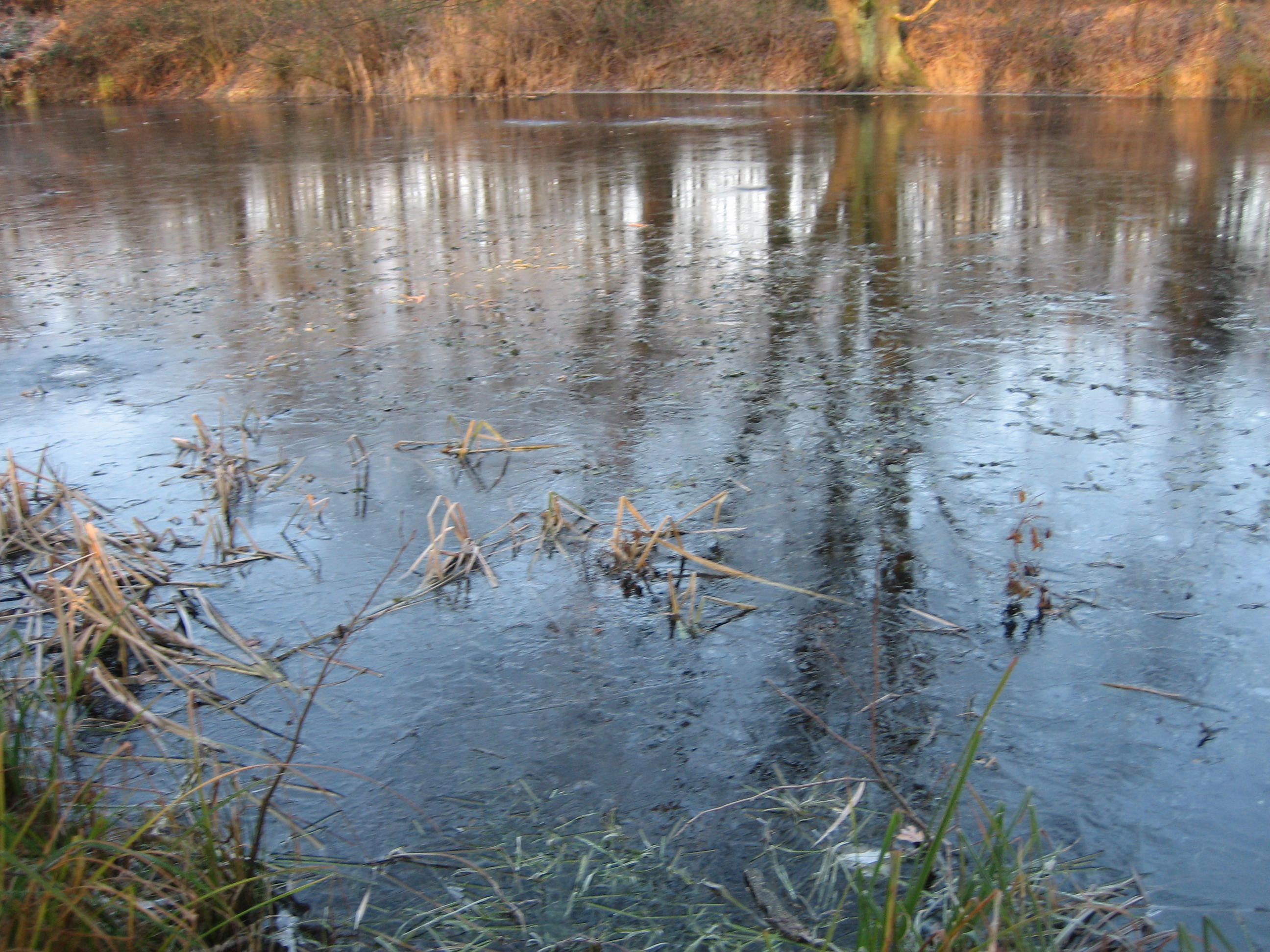
Baden: the Woogsee near Rastatt

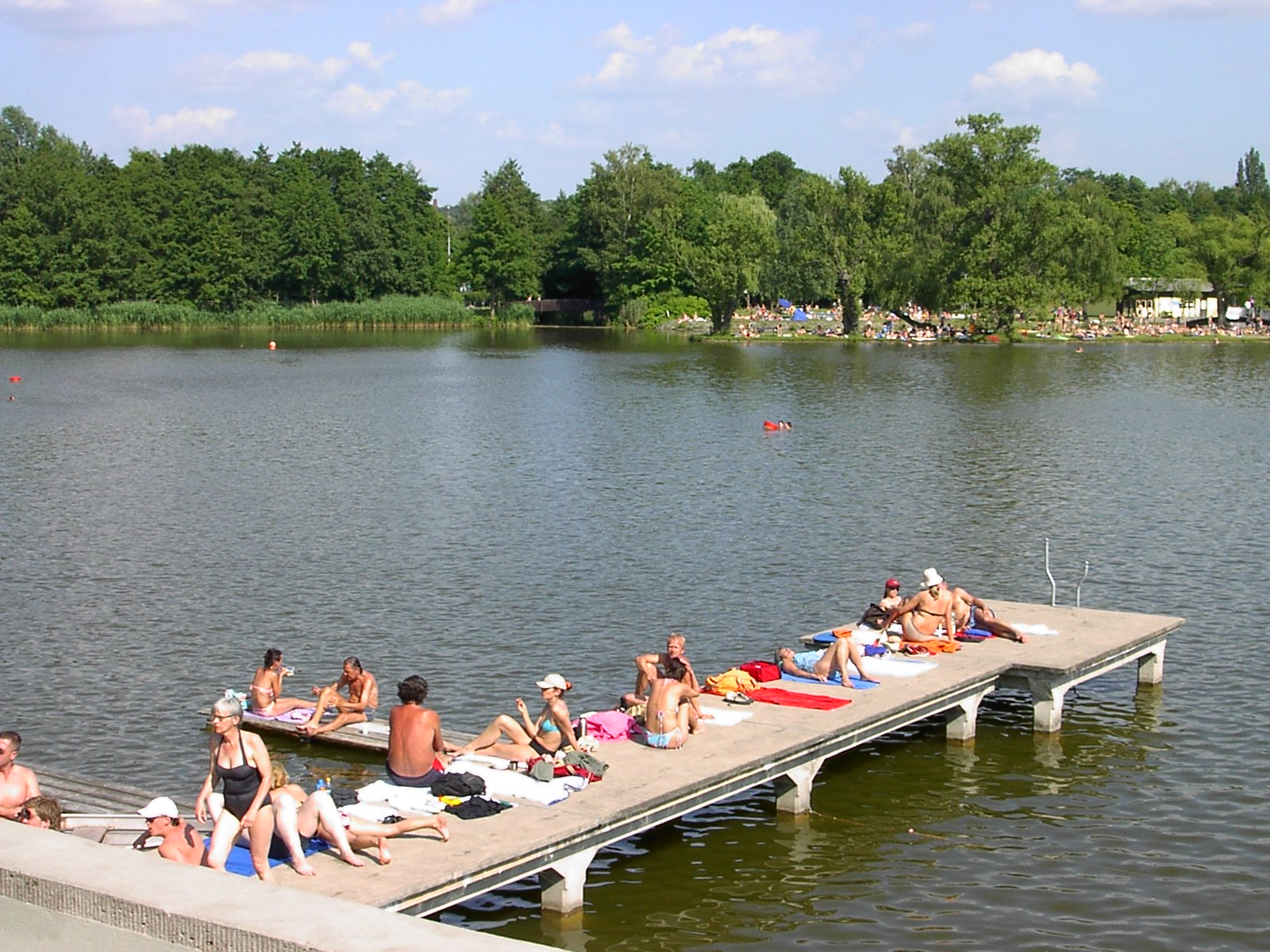
Hesse: the Großer Woog in Darmstadt

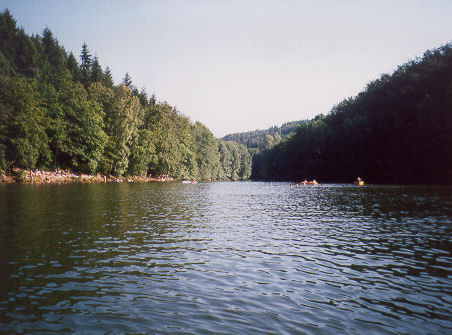
Rhineland-Palatinate: the Eiswoog in the Palatine Forest

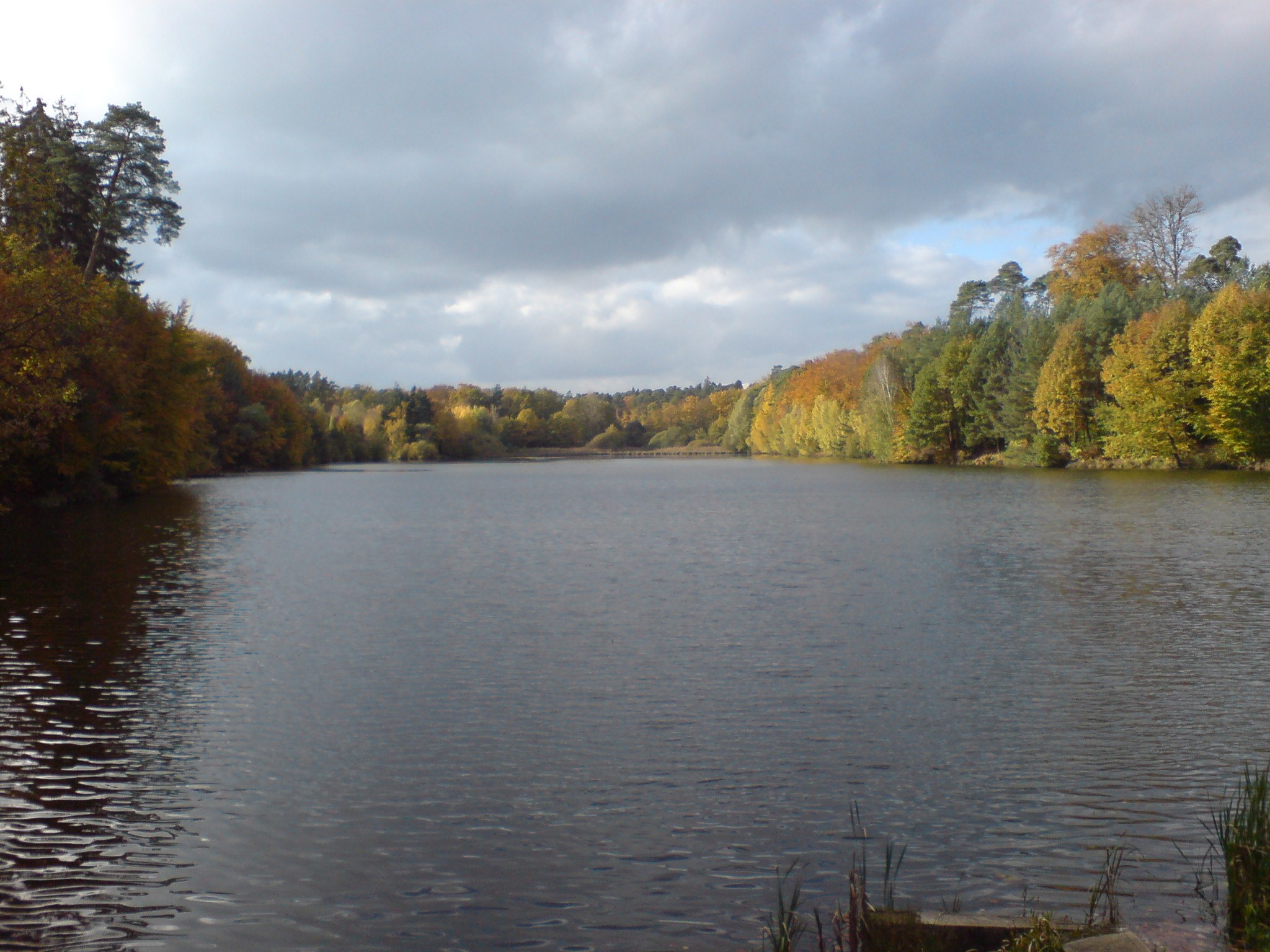
Saarland: the Möhlwoog near Jägersburg

A woog (from wâc, a Middle High German hydronym) is the local name for a body of still water in parts of southwest Germany. A woog may be of natural origin or manmade.

== Distribution of the name ==
The name is used for waterbodies in the German states of Rhineland-Palatinate (being especially common in the Palatine Forest), the Saarland, in South Hesse (commonly in the Odenwald) and in the state of Baden-Württemberg (Nordbaden); even the names of roads or settlements are derived from such bodies of water. Examples are:

=== Baden-Württemberg ===
- Woogsee, natural lake near Rastatt in the basin of the Kinzig-Murg-Rinne

=== Hesse ===
- Großer Woog, reservoir on the Darmbach

=== Rhineland-Palatinate ===
- Biedenbacher Woog, reservoir on the Leinbach
- Büttelwoog, campsite near Dahn
- Dämmelswoog, reservoir near Fischbach
- Eiswoog, reservoir on the Eisbach
- Finsterthaler Woog, reservoir on the Leinbach
- Franzosenwoog, former reservoir on the Hochspeyerbach
- Gelterswoog, reservoir of tributaries of the Aschbach
- Hammerwoog, reservoir in Kaiserslautern
- Kammerwoog, former woog on the Nahe in Idar-Oberstein, today a section of the river
- Katzenwoog, reservoir on the Erlenbach near Kaiserslautern
- Kolbenwoog, reservoir on a tributary of the Aschbach
- Mörstadter Woog, reservoir on the northern perimeter of Mörstadt
- Mühlwoog, reservoir on the Leinbach, just before its confluence with the Hochspeyerbach
- Niederhausener Woog (also Niederhausener reservoir), reservoir der Nahe between Norheim and Niederhausen
- Pfälzerwoog (also Pfalzwoog), reservoir on a right tributary of the Saarbach
- Salzwoog, district of Lemberg, named after an old reservoir on the Salzbach
- Scheidelberger Woog, nature reserve between Miesau and Hütschenhausen
- Schweinswoog, reservoir on the Eußerbach
- Seewoog, reservoir on the Leinbach near Waldleiningen
- Sixmeisterwoog reservoir on the Aggenbach near Otterberg
- Spießwoog, reservoir near Fischbach
- Stüdenwoog reservoir on the Eppenbrunner Bach
- Vogelwoog, reservoir and surrounding nature reserve on the edge of Kaiserslautern
- Woogfelsen rocks, a heritage site on the Biedenbacher Woog in Frankenstein (Pfalz)

=== Saarland ===
- Alter Woog, road name in the old town of St. Wendel
- Am Altwoog, road name in the Neunkirchen district of Furpach
- Merwoog, road name in Kirrberg derived from an old reservoir on the Lambsbach
- Möhlwoog, reservoir on the Erbach near Homburg-Jägersburg
- Woogbachtal (also Ensheimer Gelösch), valley with ponds near Saarbrücken-Ensheim Airport
- Zum Altwoog, road name in Fürth im Ostertal
