= Hochspeyerbach =

River in Germany

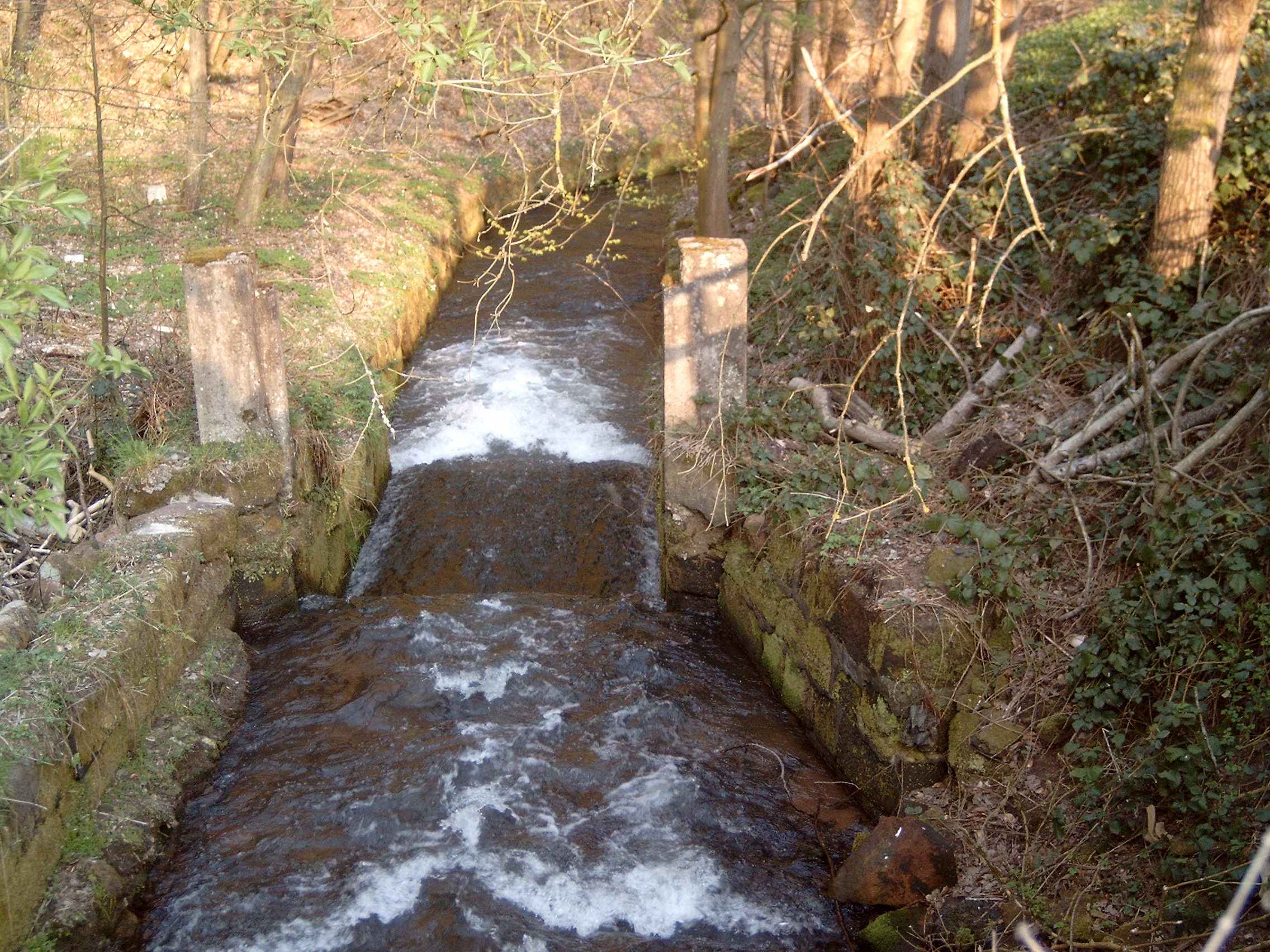
- Hochspeyerbach at Weidenthal

Location
- Country: Germany
- Region: Palatinate Forest

Physical characteristics
- Source
  - location: in Hochspeyer
  - coordinates: 49°26′27″N 7°53′34″E
  - elevation: 267 m (876 ft)
- Mouth
  - location: Confluence with Speyerbach at Frankeneck
  - coordinates: 49°22′34″N 8°3′12″E
  - elevation: 170 m (560 ft)
- Length: 21.33 km (13.25 mi)
- Basin size: 119 km^{2} (46 sq mi)
- Discharge
  - average: 0.841 m^{3}/s (29.7 cu ft/s)

Basin features
- Progression: Speyerbach→ Rhine→ North Sea
- Tributaries
  - left: Fischbach, Glasbach, Erlenbach
  - right: Leinbach

The Hochspeyerbach (German pronunciation: [ˈhoːxʃpaɪɐˌbax]) is a 21 km (13 mi) long river in the Palatinate Forest in Rhineland-Palatinate and a left tributary of the Speyerbach.

== Course ==
The Hochspeyerbach rises in the municipality Hochspeyer in the immediate vicinity of the swimming pool. In earlier times the river was dammed about 200 m (660 ft) from the source, and this reservoir was the swimming pool. The water of the newly reconstructed habitat spring pond is fed into a pipe system by an overflow drain. About 600 metres (2,000 ft) east of the pond, the river flows freely again, to the east, parallel to the Palatine Ludwig Railway through the village of Hochspeyer. After crossing the railway loop connecting the Ludwig Railway to the Alsenztalbahn, it takes up the river Fischbach from the left. A few kilometers further, it flows through the former Franzosenwoog reservoir. At the entrance to Frankenstein, it takes up the Glasbach from the left, coming from the Diemerstein Valley. In the village of Frankenstein makes a noticeable change of direction and starts flowing southeast parallel to the federal road B39, which begins in Frankenstein, in the direction of Neustadt an der Weinstrasse. A kilometer outside Frankenstein, the Hochspeyerbach takes up the Leinbach. It then flows through the municipalities of Weidenthal and Neidenfels. On the municipal boundary between Frankeneck and Lambrecht, it flows into the Speyerbach from the left.

== River bed ==
The Hochspeyerbach has a man-made stream bed over its entire length. The first 600 metres (2,000 ft) of its bed are a half-open pipe. In the urban area of Hochspeyer, it is canalized. In other places, it is partly canalized, partly encased. After the confluence with Fischbach, it was straightened, to enable timber rafting, and the banks were consolidated. Before the 19th century, wickerwork was used to consolidate the embankments; during the 19th century, stone was used. The stream bottom was fixed using stones. Although no mortar was used, most of these stones are still in place.

== Name ==
The Hochspeyerbach's medieval name of Hospira Hochspeyer was documented as early as the 10th century. It was possibly derived from Spira or Spiraha, the name of the Speyerbach

Another theory posits that the word Spiraha may be derived from the Old High German spiwan ("spew"). The Middle High German form spiren suggests that an alternative Old High German form might have been spiran, although there are no references for this form. This could have been combined with an old name suffix -aha ("streaming"), which is probably related to the Latin: aqua ("water"). So Spiraha may have meant "spewing out water", in which case the spring would have given its name to the stream.

== See also ==
- List of rivers of Rhineland-Palatinate
