= Breitenstein Castle =

Castle in Germany

- Burg Breitenstein
- Elmstein
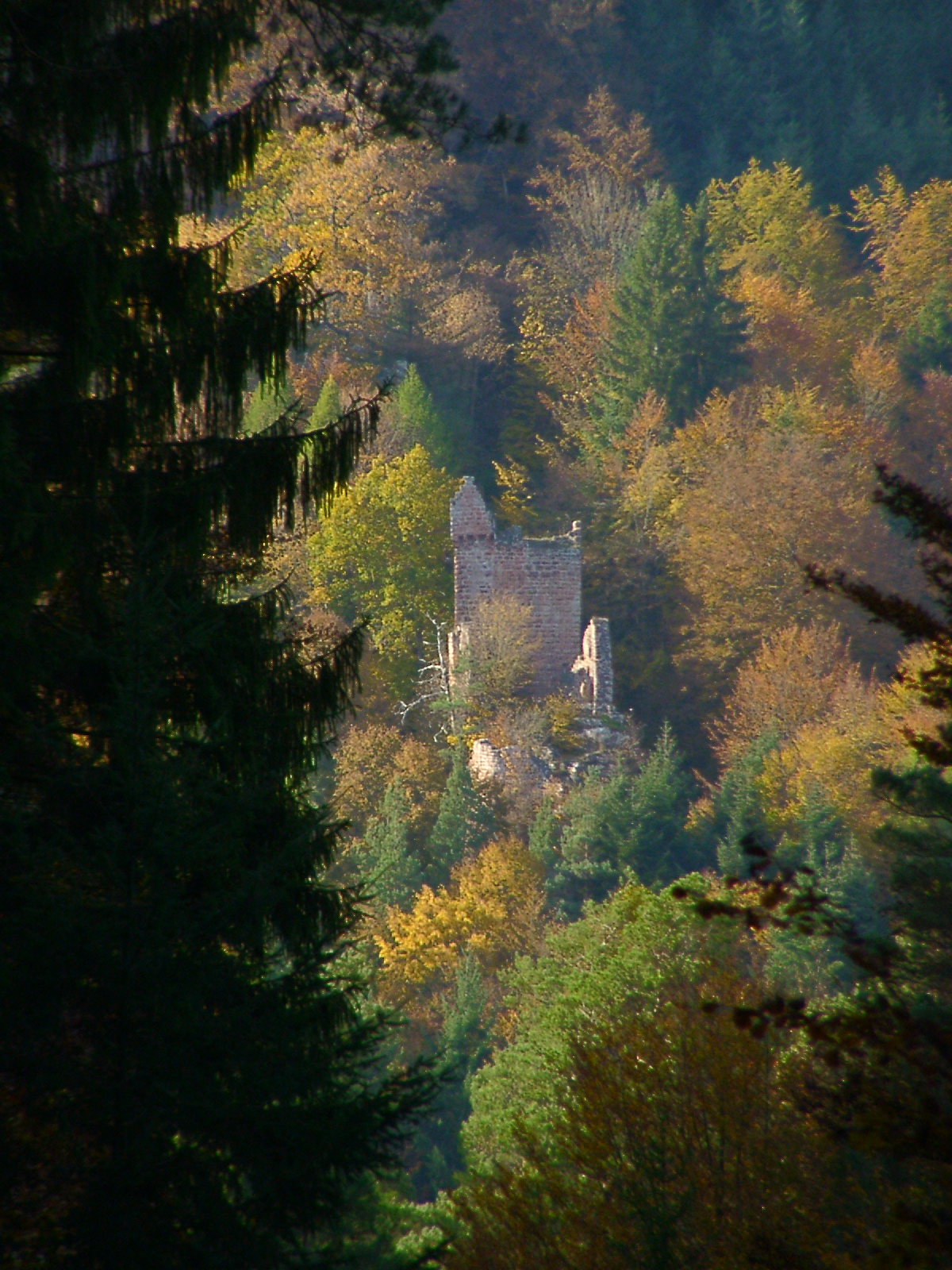
- Breitenstein Castle

Site information
- Type: hill castle, rock castle
- Code: DE-RP
- Condition: ruin

Location
- Coordinates: 49°20′41″N 7°59′55″E
- Height: 220 m above sea level (NN)

Site history
- Built: 1246
- Materials: rusticated ashlar

The ruins of Breitenstein Castle (German: Burg Breitenstein) stand on a crag, 220 metres (720 ft) high, on the northern side of the Speyerbach valley in the Palatine Forest in Germany. The castles is 4 kilometres (2.5 mi) east of the village of Elmstein in the county of Bad Dürkheim in the state of Rhineland-Palatinate.

== History ==
The rock castle was probably built in 1246 by Pope Innocent IV during the unrest over the excommunication of Frederick II. Not until 1257 was it mentioned in the records in connexion with a knight of Kropsberg, castellan of the Breitenstein and Dienstmann of the counts of Leiningen. The knight was named in 1265 as Burkhard of Breitenstein. In 1339 James of Flörsheim was appointed as Burgmann.

After the death of King Rudolph of Habsburg fighting broke out in 1291 between the Habsburgs and their opponents. At that time the counts of Sponheim built a siege castle just a few metres south of Breitenstein Castle. The two sites were separated from one another by a broad neck ditch. The siege castle was mentioned in 1340 as Lower Breitenstein (Nieder-Breitenstein). In that year, Count Walram of Sponheim was found guilty at the royal court in Munich of building a castle on the territory of the prince-bishopric of Speyer without permission and was to hand it over to the Speyer vassal (Lehnsmann), Friedrich Horneck. However, Count Palatine Rudolph II appealed against this decision and announced that the Sponheim lord was his vassal, so that he was allowed to retain the castle.

In 1357, a Burgfrieden treaty was agreed that specified that the larger siege castle would henceforth become the inner ward, and the older, smaller building complex would become the outer ward.

After the castle was mentioned for the last time in 1382, it probably came into the possession of the counts of Leiningen and was likely destroyed in 1470–71 during a feud between its tenant family and the prince-elector, Frederick I – the so-called Electoral Palatine War.

After the ruins had been taken over in 1963 by the Rhineland-Palatinate State Castle Administration, conservation and safety measures were carried out on the walls in 1988 and 1989.

== Site ==
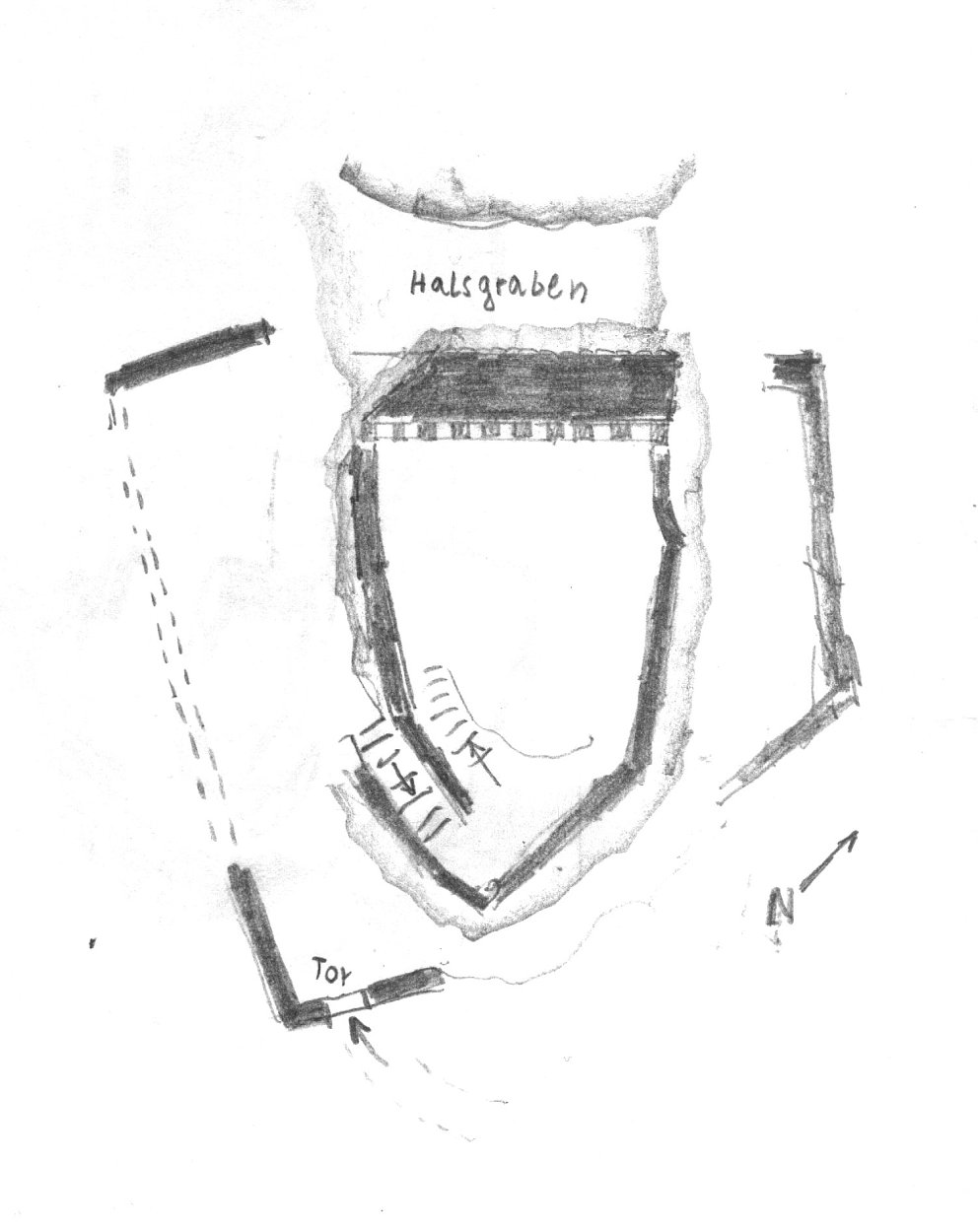
Ground plan

The Late Hohenstaufen inner ward is built on a narrow rock base that, today, is only accessible to experienced climbers. The shield wall, made of rusticated ashlars on all sides, has survived almost to its full height. Seen from the uphill side its right-hand edge is sloping. The corbels of the chemin de ronde on the inside of the wall display Gothic elements. The attack side is guarded by a neck ditch hewn deep into the rock. Behind the shield wall rises a modest domestic building of which the enceinte has only partly survived. Access to the castle was not over the moat, but up a staircase hewn out of the rock on the south side. Around the crag is an almost rectangular lower ward, of which only a few wall remains can still be seen. On the other side of the neck ditch, 50 metres (160 ft) away and 20 metres (66 ft) higher, are the remains of a separate outer ward with its own moat.

== Literature ==
- Magnus Backes, Heinz Straeter: Staatliche Burgen, Schlösser und Altertümer in Rheinland-Pfalz. Schnell & Steiner, Regensburg, 2003, ISBN 3-7954-1566-7.
- Manfred Czerwinski: Burgen – stolze Zeugen einer großen Zeit − Pfalz und Umgebung. Verlag Superior, Kaiserslautern, 2002, ISBN 3-936216-07-X.
- Walter Eitelmann: Rittersteine im Pfälzerwald. 4th revised and considerably expanded edn. Pfälzerwald-Verein, Neustadt/Weinstraße, 1998, ISBN 3-00-003544-3.
- Arndt Hartung, Walter Hartung: Pfälzer Burgenrevier. 6th rev. edn. Pfälzische Verlagsanstalt, Ludwigshafen, 1985, ISBN 3-9801043-0-3.
- Walter Herrmann: Auf rotem Fels. Ein Führer zu den schönsten Burgen der Pfalz und des elsässischen Wasgau. Braun, Karlsruhe, 2004, ISBN 3-7650-8286-4.
- Friedrich-Wilhelm Krahe: Burgen des Deutschen Mittelalters. Bechtermünz-Verlag, Augsburg, 1996, ISBN 3-86047-219-4.
- Elena Rey: Burgenführer Pfalz. Superior, Kaiserslautern, 2003, ISBN 3-936216-15-0.
- Alexander Thon (ed.): Wie Schwalbennester an den Felsen geklebt. Burgen in der Nordpfalz. 1st edn. Schnell + Steiner, Regensburg, 2005, pp. 40–43, ISBN 3-7954-1674-4.
