= Franzosenwoog =

Former reservoir in Germany

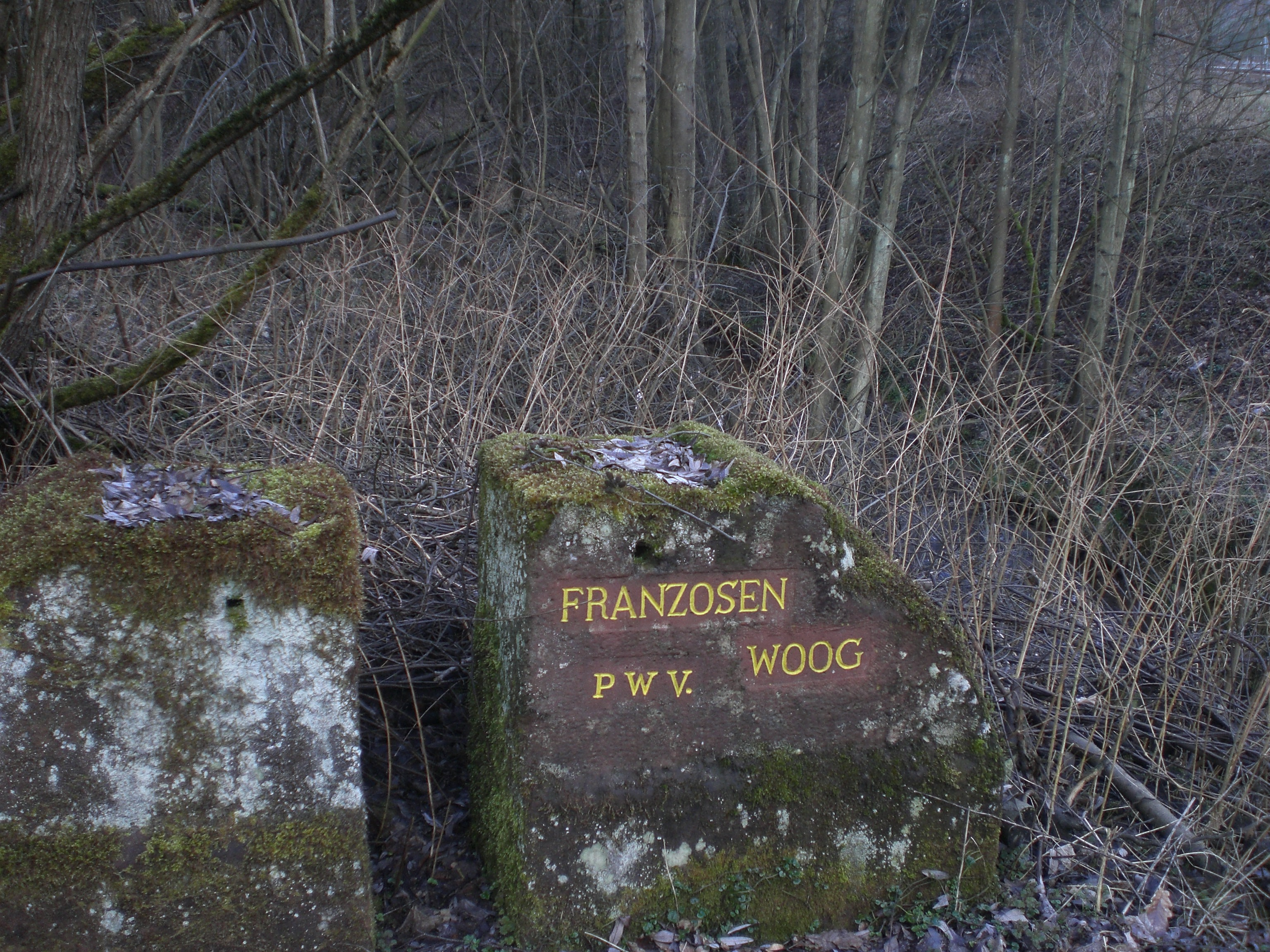

- Location within Rhineland-Palatinate
- Location: Pfälzerwald, Rhineland-Palatinate
- Coordinates: 49°26′29″N 7°55′46″E
- Primary inflows: Hochspeyerbach
- Primary outflows: Hochspeyerbach
- Basin countries: Germany
- Surface area: 0 m^{2} (0 sq ft)
- Water volume: 0 m^{3} (0 cu ft)
- Shore length^{1}: 0 km (0 mi)
- ^{1} Shore length is not a well-defined measure.

Franzosenwoog is a former reservoir in Pfälzerwald, Rhineland-Palatinate, Germany. It was created around 1828 to facilitate timber rafting on the nearby Hochspeyerbach and ceased to exist around 1885.
