= Helmbach (Speyerbach) =

River in Germany

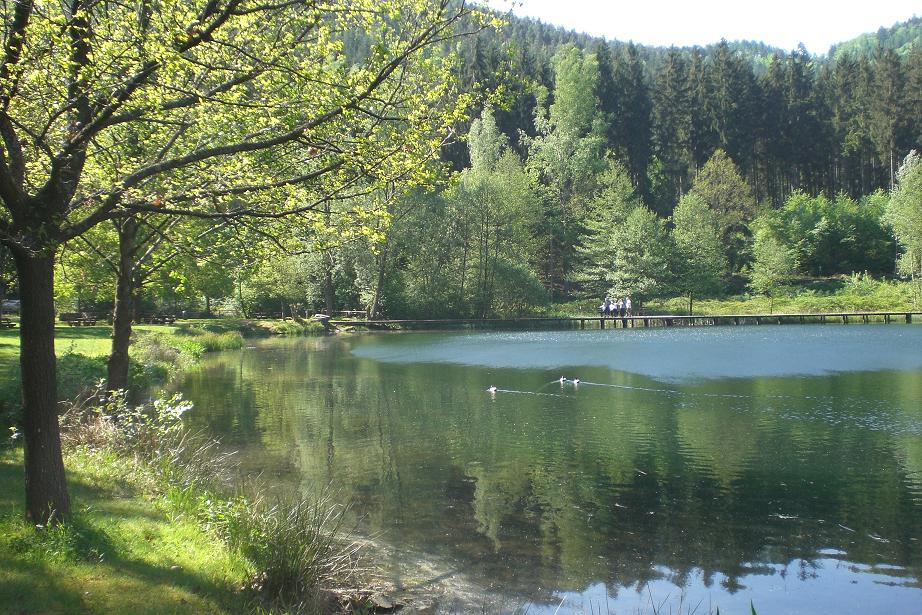
- The Helmbachweiher

Location
- Country: Germany
- State: Rhineland-Palatinate
- Region: Palatine Forest
- Reference no.: DE: 23782

Physical characteristics
- Source
  - location: near Forsthaus Taubensuhl
  - coordinates: 49°17′40″N 7°54′05″E
  - elevation: ca. 394 m above sea level (NN)
- Mouth
  - location: Near Helmbach into the Speyerbach
  - coordinates: 49°20′36″N 7°59′09″E
  - elevation: ca. 201 m above sea level (NN)
- Length: 11.05 km (6.87 mi)
- Basin size: 53.569 km^{2} (20.683 sq mi)

Basin features
- Progression: Speyerbach→ Rhine→ North Sea
- Landmarks: Large towns: Exclave of Landau in der Pfalz
- Tributaries
  - left: Blattbach, Iggelbach
  - right: Grobsbach, Kohlbach

The Helmbach is an 11 km (6.8 mi) long tributary of the Speyerbach stream in the Palatine Forest in the German state of Rhineland-Palatinate.

== Course ==
The stream rises northwest of the Taubensuhl Forester's Lodge (Forsthauses Taubensuhl) and flows initially 4 km (2.5 mi) in a northeasterly direction to the Geiswiese meadow. There it is joined on the left by the Blattbach, which rises on the north slopes of the 551 m above NN high Blattberg hill, and then heads in an easterly to northeasterly direction. After another 2 km the Helmbach passes the woodland hotel at Hornesselwiese, which was burnt down in November 2002 and, after being rebuilt in 2010, has been opened again as a woodland restaurant since January 2011 . There the stream is joined by the Grobsbach and, 2.5 km (1.6 mi) further on, the Iggelbach empties into it from the left. After a total of 10 km (6.2 mi) the Helmbach reaches another forester's lodge, the Forsthaus Helmbach. Here it is joined on the right by the Kohlbach, which has been impounded to create the reservoir of Helmbachweiher a little to the east. The Helmbach itself discharges into the Speyerbach at the eponymous village of Helmbach after about 11 km (6.8 mi). Here there is a halt on the Kuckucksbähnel heritage railway.

== Tributaries ==
- Trockendeichbach (left), 1.49 km (0.93 mi)
- Blattbach (left), 3.06 km (1.90 mi)
- Grobsbach (right), 4.35 km (2.70 mi)
- Hunzelbach (right), 1.51 km (0.94 mi)
- Frechenbach (right), 0.62 km (0.39 mi)
- Iggelbach (left), 5.08 km (3.16 mi)
- Kohlbach (right), 4.98 km (3.09 mi)

== See also ==
- List of rivers of Rhineland-Palatinate
