= Speyerbrunn =

- hamlet
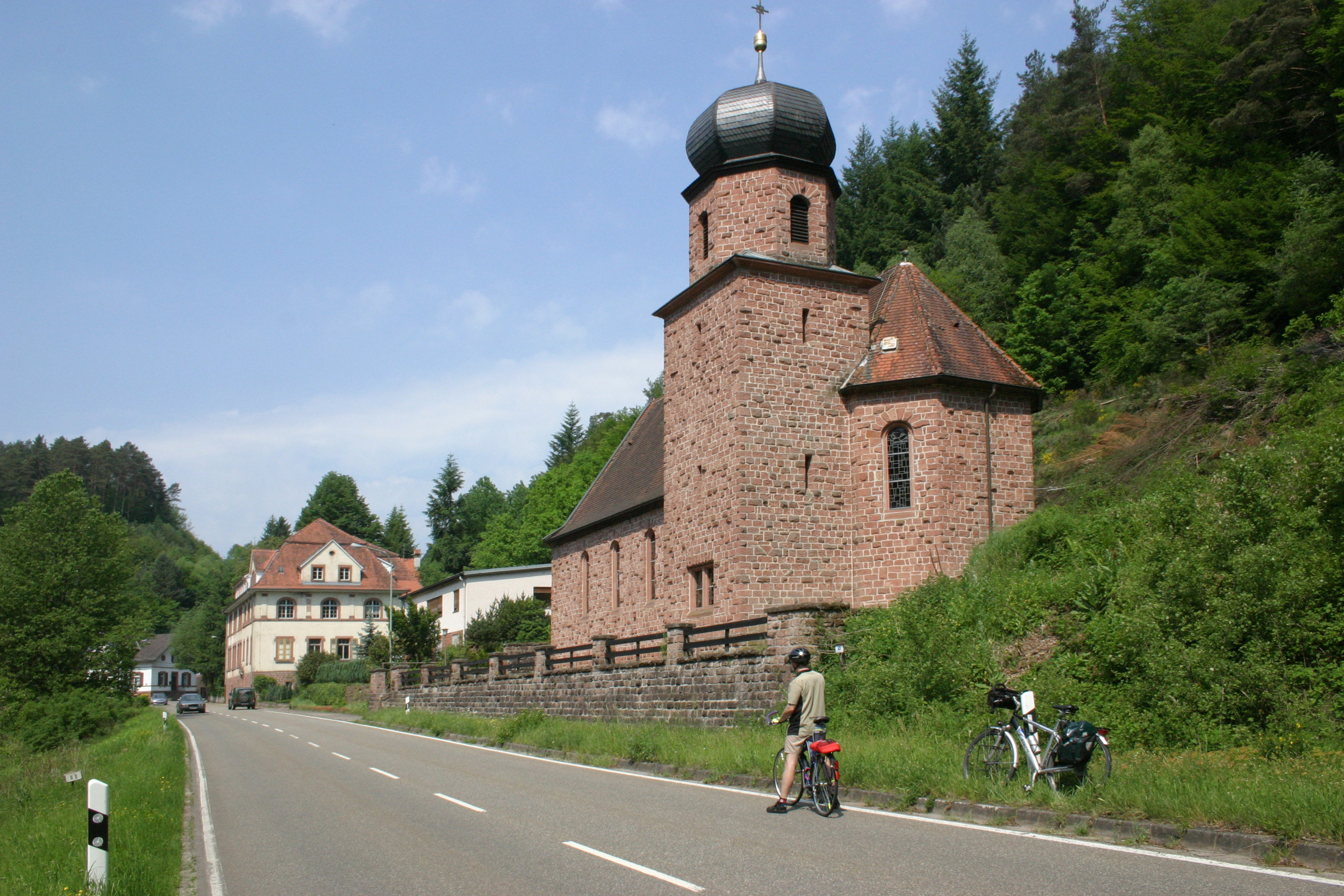

- Location within Rhineland-Palatinate
- Coordinates: 49°20′59″N 7°52′16″E
- country: Germany
- state: Rhineland-Palatinate
- Landkreis: Bad Dürkheim
- municipality: Elmstein
- Named for: Speyerbach
- Highest elevation: 337 m (1,106 ft)
- Lowest elevation: 312 m (1,024 ft)

Population
  - Total: 100
- Postleitzahl: 67471
- Area code: +49 6328

Speyerbrunn (German pronunciation: [ˈʃpaɪɐbʁʊn]) is a Ortsteil of the municipality Elmstein in the Landkreis of Bad Dürkheim in Rhineland-Palatinate, Germany

== Location ==
It is located in Palatinate Forest about 3 mi (4.8 km) west of Elmstein.

== History ==
Speyerbrunn was founded in 1754. Until 1975 the town belonged to the municipality Wilgartswiesen, which was merged with the neighboring towns Schwarzenbach, Erlenbach and Elmstein in a local government reform on January 1, 1976.
