= Elmstein Castle =

Castle in Germany

- Burg Elmstein
- Elmstein
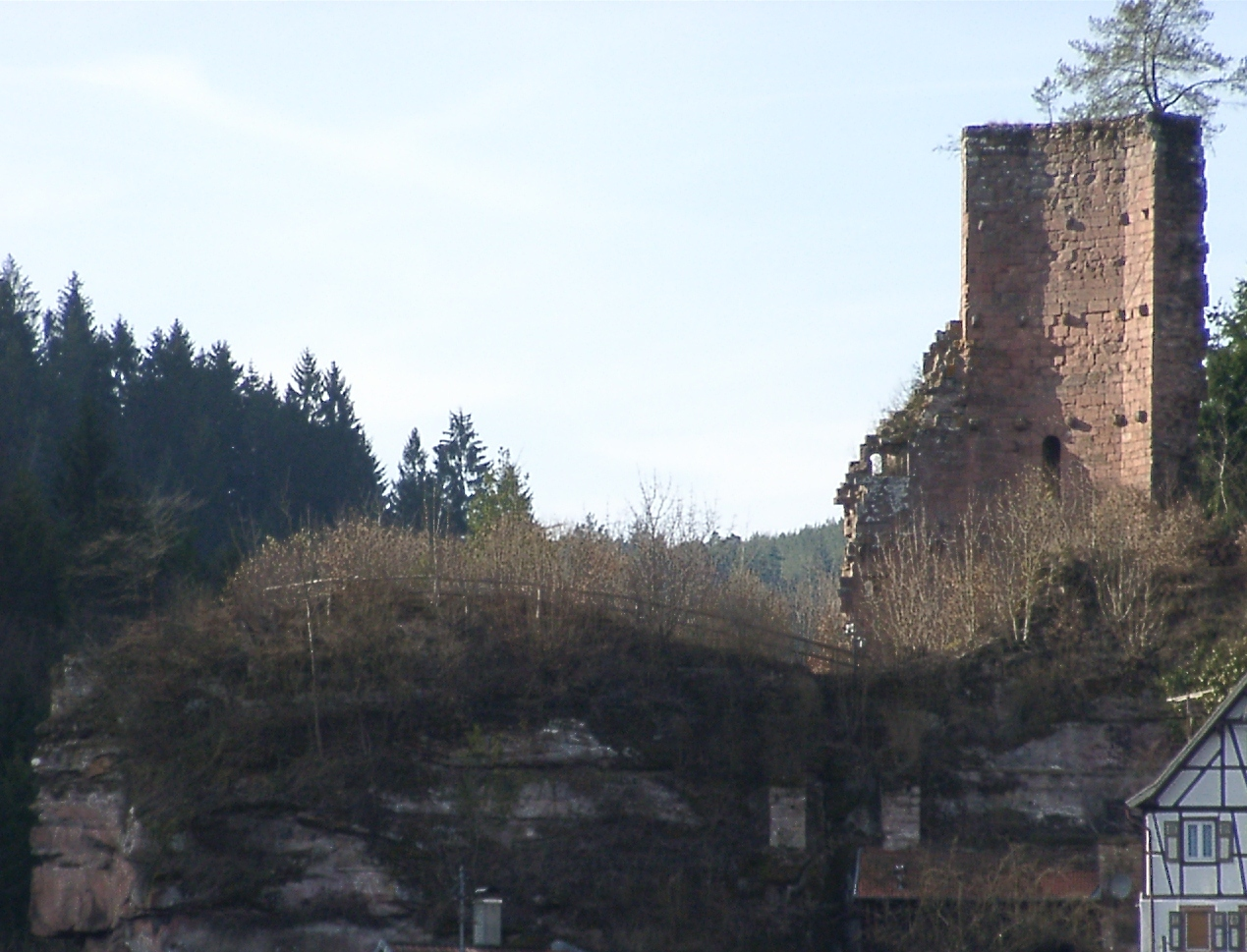
- Elmstein Castle - View of the castle rock and the ruins of the shield wall from the southeast

Site information
- Type: hill castle, spur castle
- Code: DE-RP
- Condition: ruin

Location
- Coordinates: 49°21′08″N 7°55′58″E
- Height: 290 m above sea level (NN)

Site history
- Built: probably 12th century

Elmstein Castle (German: Burg Elmstein) is a castle ruin built in the High Middle Ages overlooking Elmstein in the Palatinate Forest in the German state of Rhineland-Palatinate. It was built in the 12th century.

== Location ==
The ruins are on a hill, 290 metres (950 ft) high, on the northern side of the Speyerbach valley (Speyerbachtal) in the Palatinate Forest (Pfälzerwald).

== History ==
In the 12th and 13th centuries, Elmstein was built as a Palatine castle in order to guard the route through the valley. The feoffees held the title of Schenk, a German aristocratic title that originally meant cup bearer. The castle occupied by the Electorate of the Palatinate. Between 1220 and 1230, the lower curtain wall was built. Emperor Louis IV of Bavaria ceded the castle to his cousin, the Count Palatine. From 1419 to 1437, the castle was occupied by Count John V of Sponheim. In 1466, the castle was enfeoffed by Frederick I the Elector, to Erhard of Remchingen. In 1513, in the course of changes of ownership, Henry of Pagk was given the castle as a fief. During the German Peasants' War in 1525 the castle was damaged. Count Palatine John Casimir inherited the castle in 1576. The castle was also damaged during the Thirty Years' War in 1648. In 1689, during the War of the Palatine Succession, the castle fell into a permanent state of disrepair. Since then, the castle has been in private ownership.

== Remains ==
The remains of the parts of the original curtain walls, the palas and the shield wall are still able to be seen today.

== Literature ==
- Arndt Hartung, Walter Hartung: Pfälzer Burgenbrevier: Aufbaustudien. 6th expanded edn., Pfälzische Verlagsanstalt, Ludwigshafen, 1985, ISBN 3-9801043-0-3.
- Walter Herrmann: Auf rotem Fels. Ein Führer zu den schönsten Burgen der Pfalz und des elsässischen Wasgau. Braun, Karlsruhe, 2004, ISBN 3-7650-8286-4.
- Günter Stein: Burgen und Schlösser in der Pfalz. Weidlich, Frankfurt/Main, 1976, ISBN 3-8035-8356-X.
- Alexander Thon (ed.): Wie Schwalbennester an den Felsen geklebt. Burgen in der Nordpfalz. 1st edn., Schnell + Steiner, Regensburg, 2005, pp. 40–43, ISBN 3-7954-1674-4.

== See also ==
- List of castles in Rhineland-Palatinate
