= Rehbach (Palatinate) =

River in Germany

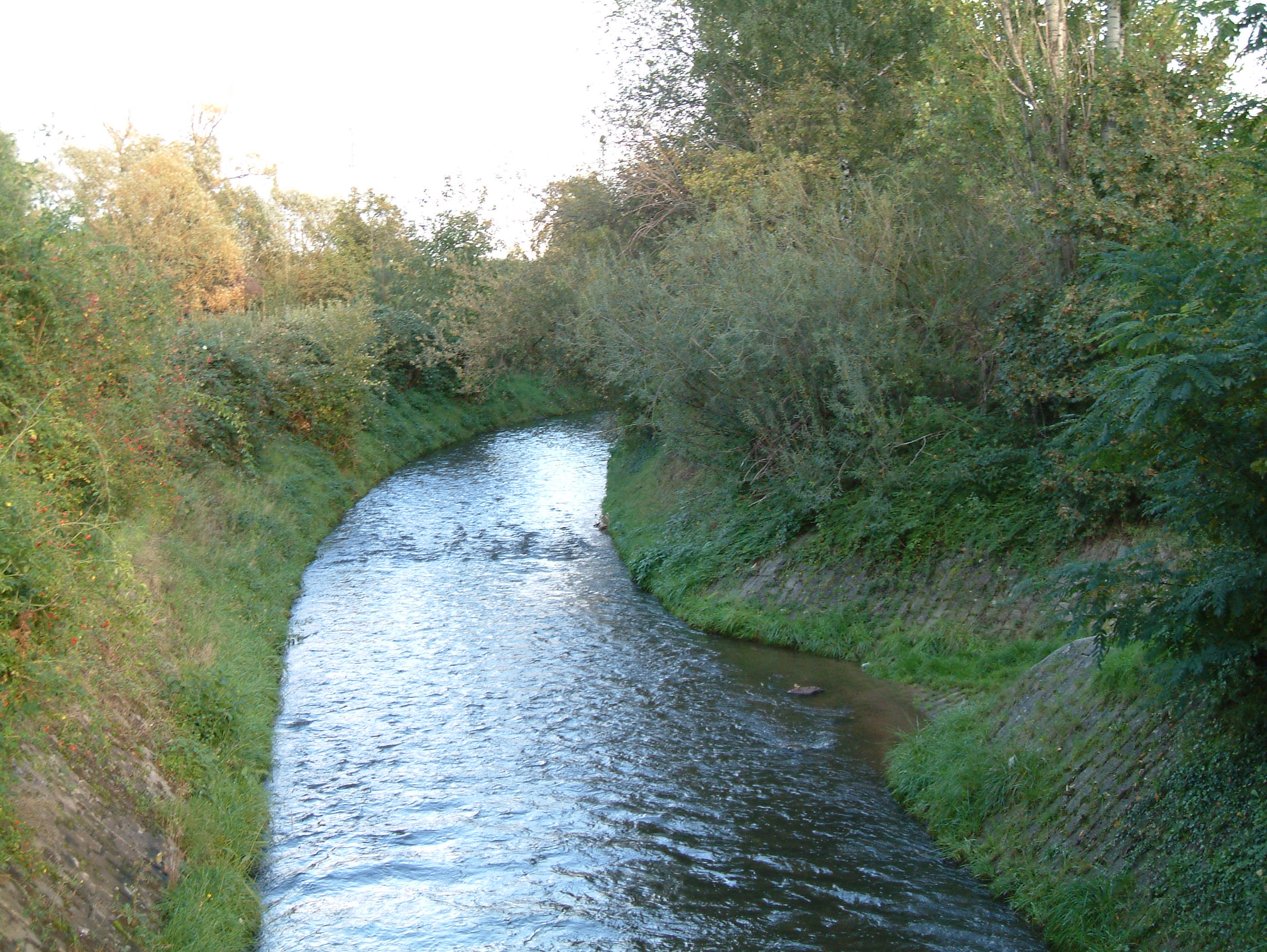
- Rehbach in Neustadt an der Weinstrasse: View to the east from the bridge of the Landwehrstraße

Location
- Country: Germany
- State: Rhineland-Palatinate

Physical characteristics
- Source
  - location: Left distributary of the Speyerbach in Neustadt an der Weinstrasse
  - coordinates: 49°21′20″N 8°9′19″E
  - elevation: 130 m (430 ft)
- Mouth
  - location: Into the Rhine, between Altrincham and Ludwigshafen
  - coordinates: 49°26′47″N 8°26′41″E
- Length: 29.03 km (18.04 mi)
- Basin size: 149.894 km^{2} (57.874 sq mi)

Basin features
- Progression: Rhine→ North Sea
- Tributaries
  - left: Mußbach, Steinbach
  - right: Ranschgraben
- Cities: Ludwigshafen am Rhein, Neustadt an der Weinstrasse, Schifferstadt

The Rehbach is a river in Rhineland-Palatinate, Germany. It is about 29 kilometres (18 mi) long and is a left tributary of the Rhine.

== History ==
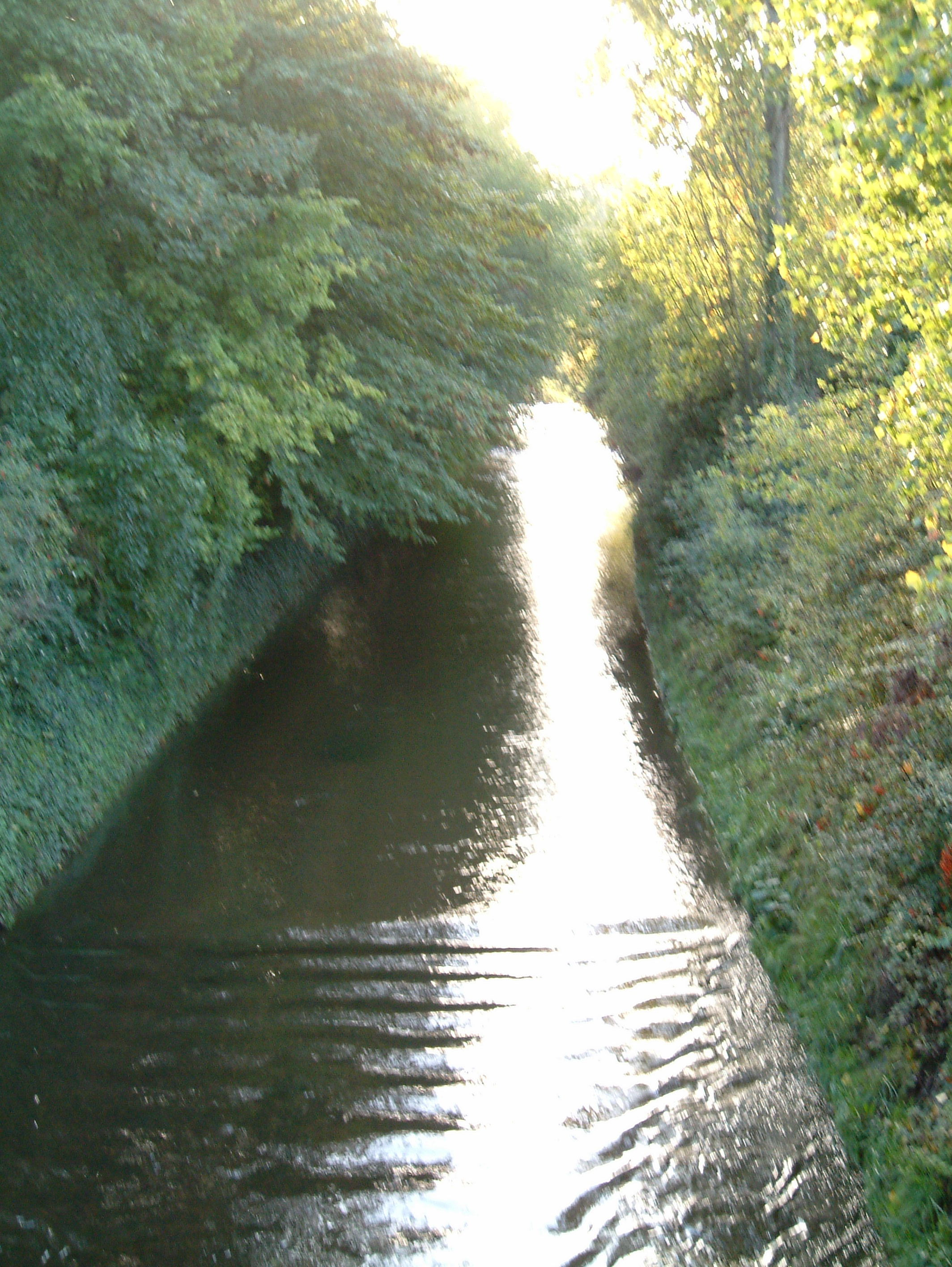
Rehbach in Neustadt an der Weinstrasse: View to the West from the bridge of the Landwehrstraße

The Rehbach does not have a source: The Speyerbach splits on the Winzinger Wassergescheid in Neustadt an der Weinstrasse, with about 1/3 of the water going left and forming the Rehbach and the other 2/3 going right and continuing as Speyerbach. After leaving the district of Neustadt, the Rehbach flows through the western part of the Upper Rhine Valley, initially in an easterly direction, later more northeast. It touches the municipalities of Haßloch, Böhl-Iggelheim, Schifferstadt, Limburgerhof and Neuhofen. Between Altrip and Ludwigshafen, it flows into the Upper Rhine from the left.

== Tributaries ==
The main tributaries of the left Rehbach are Mußbach, which flows into the Rehbach between Haßloch and the Mußbach district of Neustadt, and the Steinbach, which flows into the Rehbach above Schifferstadt. The strongest right tributary is the Ranschgraben. Like the Rehbach itself, this is a tributary of the Speyerbach. It splits off from Speyerbach just north of Speyerdorf and flows into Rehbach East of Limburgerhof-Rehhütte, after crossing below Rehbach a few hundred meters before at Limburgerhof-Kohlhof.

== History ==
In the Middle Ages, the water of the Rehbach was already diverted from Speyerbach in the village of Winzingen, which today is a district of Neustadt. In the area of Haßloch and Böhl-Iggelheim, it was split into two parallel arms for about 8 kilometres (5 mi). They provided the water for the local drive watermills and sawmills. On the southern arm, the actual Rehbach, three mills have been preserved. Below Böhl-Iggelheim, the Steinbach flows into the Rehbach, as does the water from the Niederwiesenweiher, a 10-hectare (25-acre) re-naturalized gravel pit.

Since 1981, large parts of the Speyerbach and Rehbach between Neustadt and Speyer, that were not used for industrial purposes, form the landscape conservation area Rehbach-Speyerbach.

== See also ==
- List of rivers of Rhineland-Palatinate
