= Frankeneck =

- Municipality
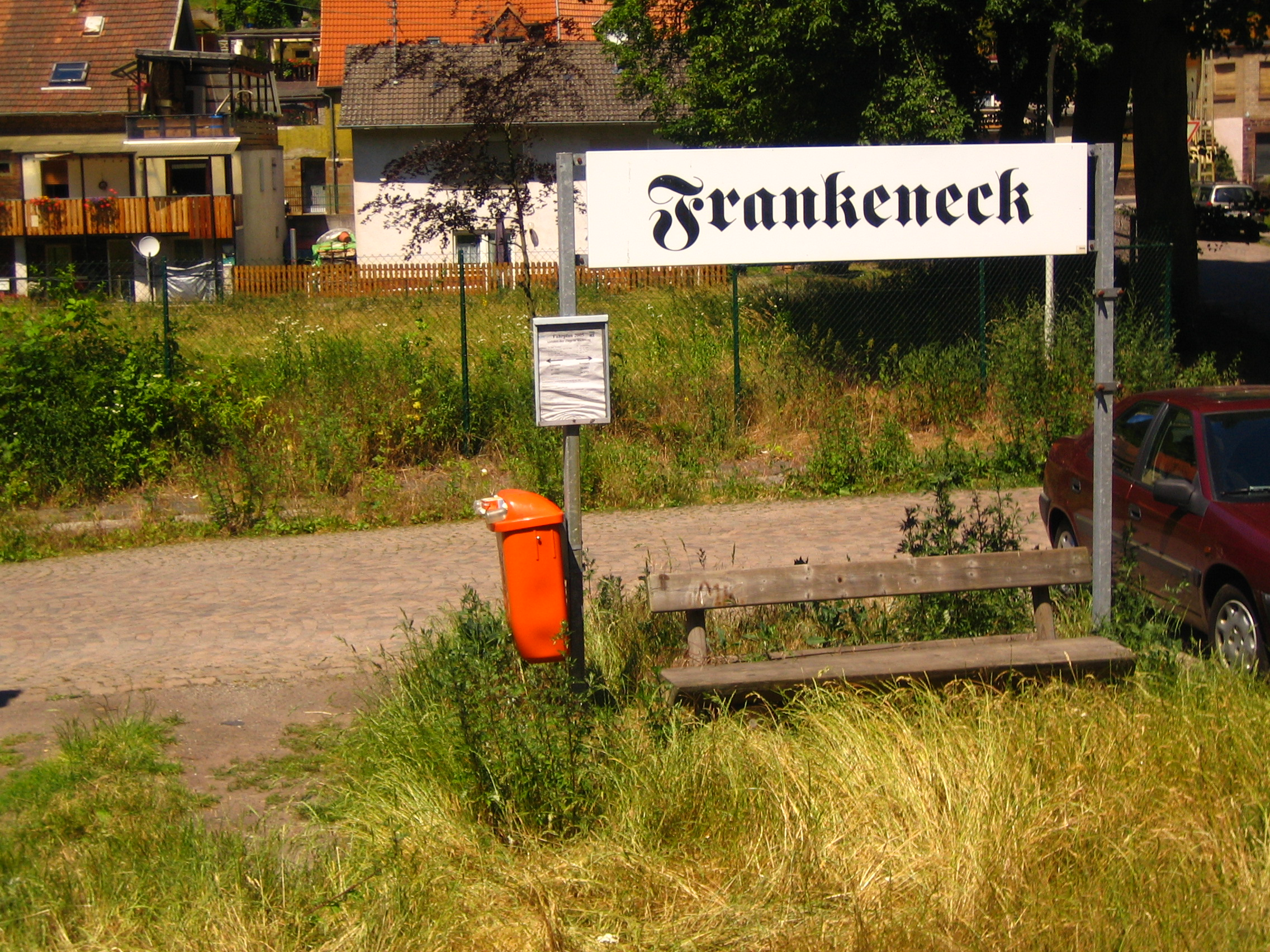
- Frankeneck Railway halt

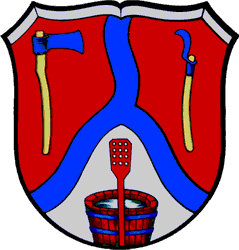
- Coat of arms

- Location of Frankeneck within Bad Dürkheim district
- Interactive map of Frankeneck
- Location within Germany Location within Rhineland-Palatinate
- Coordinates: 49°22′35″N 8°2′55″E
- Country: Germany
- State: Rhineland-Palatinate
- District: Bad Dürkheim
- Municipal assoc.: Lambrecht (Pfalz)

Government
  - Mayor (2019–24): Marco Fränzel (SPD)

Area
  - Total: 4.76 km^{2} (1.84 sq mi)
- Elevation: 173 m (568 ft)

Population (2025-12-31)
  - Total: 851
  - Density: 179/km^{2} (463/sq mi)
- Time zone: UTC+01:00 (CET)
  - Summer (DST): UTC+02:00 (CEST)
- Postal codes: 67468
- Dialling codes: 06353
- Vehicle registration: DÜW
- Website: www.frankeneck.de

Frankeneck is an Ortsgemeinde – a municipality belonging to a Verbandsgemeinde, a kind of collective municipality – in the Bad Dürkheim district in Rhineland-Palatinate, Germany.

== Geography ==
=== Location ===
The municipality lies in the Palatinate Forest at the forks of the Speyerbach and the Hochspeyerbach. It belongs to the Verbandsgemeinde of Lambrecht, whose seat is in the like-named town.

== History ==
The municipality was founded in 1785.

=== Religion ===
In 2007, 44.9% of the inhabitants were Evangelical and 29.2% Catholic. The rest belonged to other faiths or adhered to none.

== Politics ==
=== Municipal council ===
The council is made up of 12 council members, who were elected at the municipal election held on 7 June 2009, and the honorary mayor as chairman.

The municipal election held on 7 June 2009 yielded the following results:

	SPD	CDU	Total
2009	8	4	12 seats
2004	8	4	12 seats

=== Coat of arms ===
The German blazon reads: Durch eine blaue Wellendeichsel, oben rechts in Rot ein schwebendes blaues Beil mit goldenem Stiel, oben links in Rot ein schwebender blauer Forstsichelhaken mit goldenem Stiel, unten in Silber eine blaubereifte rote Bütte mit silbernem Inhalt, davor stehend ein rotes Rührsieb.

The municipality’s arms might in English heraldic language be described thus: A pall reversed wavy azure, dexter gules an axe palewise of the first helved Or, the head to chief and the edge to sinister, sinister gules a forester’s bill palewise of the first helved of the third, the head to chief and the hook to dexter, in base argent issuant from base a vat of the second hooped of the first with contents of the field, surmounted by a stirring sieve palewise of the second issuant from base, the handle to base.

The arms were approved in 1951 by the Mainz Ministry of the Interior, and they go back to a court seal from 1733. The charges recall that the municipality was founded as a logging village.

=== Town partnerships ===
Frankeneck fosters partnerships with the following places:

- Tenbury Wells, Worcestershire, England, United Kingdom
- “Les Thuits” (Le Thuit-Signol, Le Thuit-Anger and Le Thuit-Simer), Eure, France

== Culture and sightseeing ==
=== Museums ===
In Frankeneck, the heritage railway, the Kuckucksbähnel, has a stop. The railway runs on a line between Neustadt an der Weinstraße and Elmstein. There is also a papermaking and local history museum with exhibits about local history and the development of the local paper industry.

=== Sport and leisure ===
TV Frankeneck (sport club) offers football and gymnastics.

Furthermore, there are a singing club and many other clubs.

== Famous people ==
=== Sons and daughters of the town ===
- Walter Faller, SPD politician
