= Gimmeldingen =

Village of 2636 inhabitants

Coordinates: 49°22′36″N 8°09′08″E

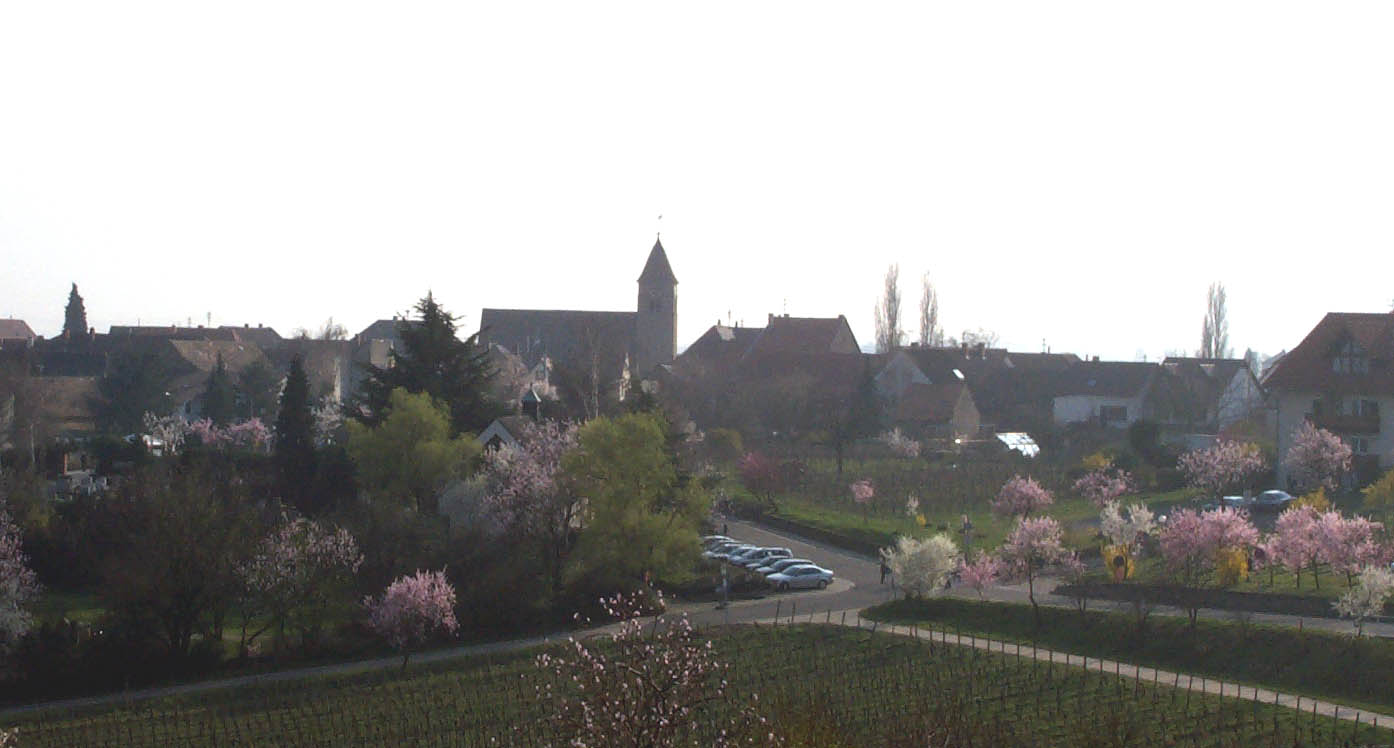
Silhouette of Gimmeldingen as seen from Neuberg.

Gimmeldingen is a village of 2636 inhabitants (as of 2004) and part of the town of Neustadt an der Weinstraße in Rhineland-Palatinate, Germany.

The beginnings of Gimmeldingen and the neighbouring village of Lobloch (which used to be connected) can be traced back to Roman settlements as early as the year 325. It is first documented in writing as "Gomeltingen" in 1109.

Gimmeldingen is best known for the yearly "Mandelblütenfestival" (almond blossom festival) which celebrates the blossoming of almond trees in spring. It is the oldest festival of its kind and opens the wine festival season ("Weinfestsaison") in Germany. The first instance of the festival is documented as taking place on the 15th of April in 1934.

== Wine ==
Gimmeldingen is located in the Palatinate wine region. The village lends its name to the collective vineyard site (Großlage) Gimmeldinger Meerspinne, covering vineyards in several surrounding villages.

Gimmeldingen has one vineyard classified as Große Lage, the highest level, by the grower organisation VDP, Mandelgarten.
