= Speyerbach =

River in Germany

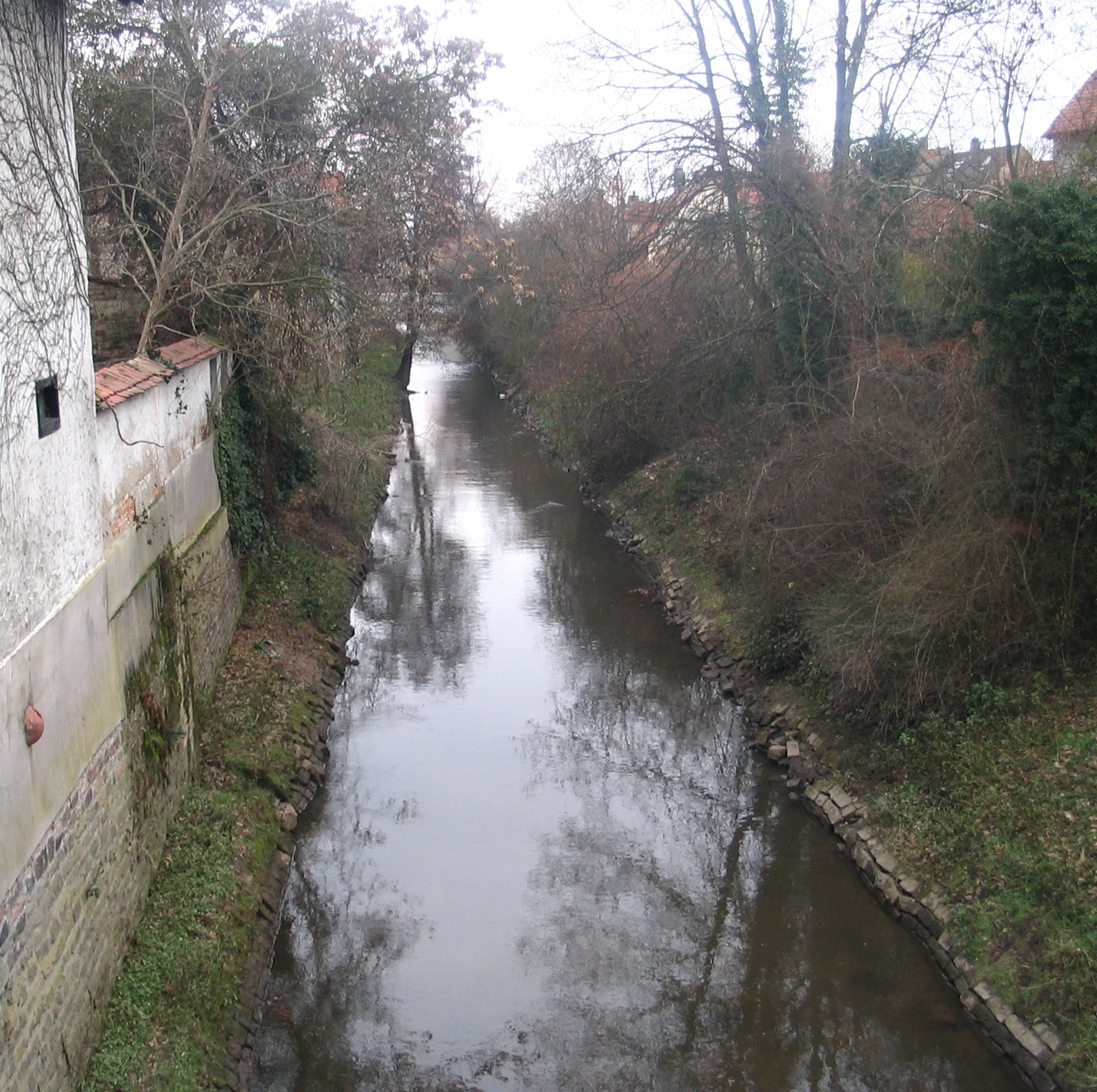
- The Speyerbach in the town of Speyer

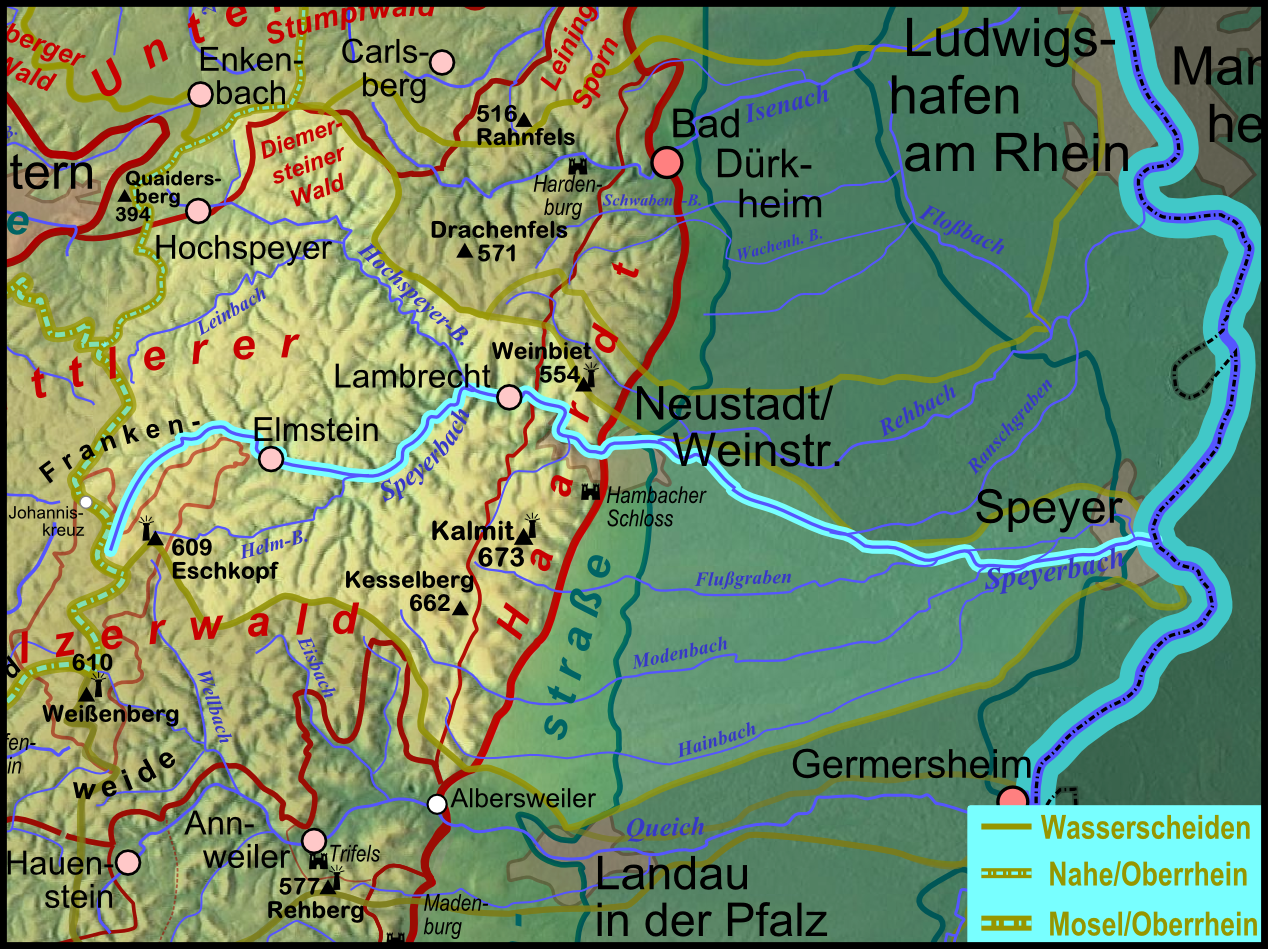
- Course of the Speyerbach to the Rhine through the Palatinate Forest and Rhine valley

Location
- Country: Germany
- State: Rhineland-Palatinate

Physical characteristics
- Source
  - location: near Speyerbrunn
  - coordinates: 49°20′58.7″N 7°52′13″E
  - elevation: 296 m (971 ft)
- Mouth
  - location: Speyer
  - coordinates: 49°19′9.5″N 8°26′58″E
  - elevation: 92 m (302 ft)
- Length: 60.1 km (37.3 mi)
- Basin size: 596 km^{2} (230 sq mi)
- Discharge
  - average: 3 m^{3}/s (110 cu ft/s)

Basin features
- Progression: Rhine→ North Sea
- Tributaries
  - left: Breitenbach, Hochspeyerbach, Luhrbach, Woogbach (splits from Speyerbach, changes its name to Nonnenbach, then rejoins)
  - right: Erlenbach, Helmbach, Mühlbachgraben, Modenbach, Hainbach
- Cities, towns, and municipalities: Town, Speyer, Lambrecht, Elmstein, Esthal, Frankeneck, Hanhofen, Dudenhofen

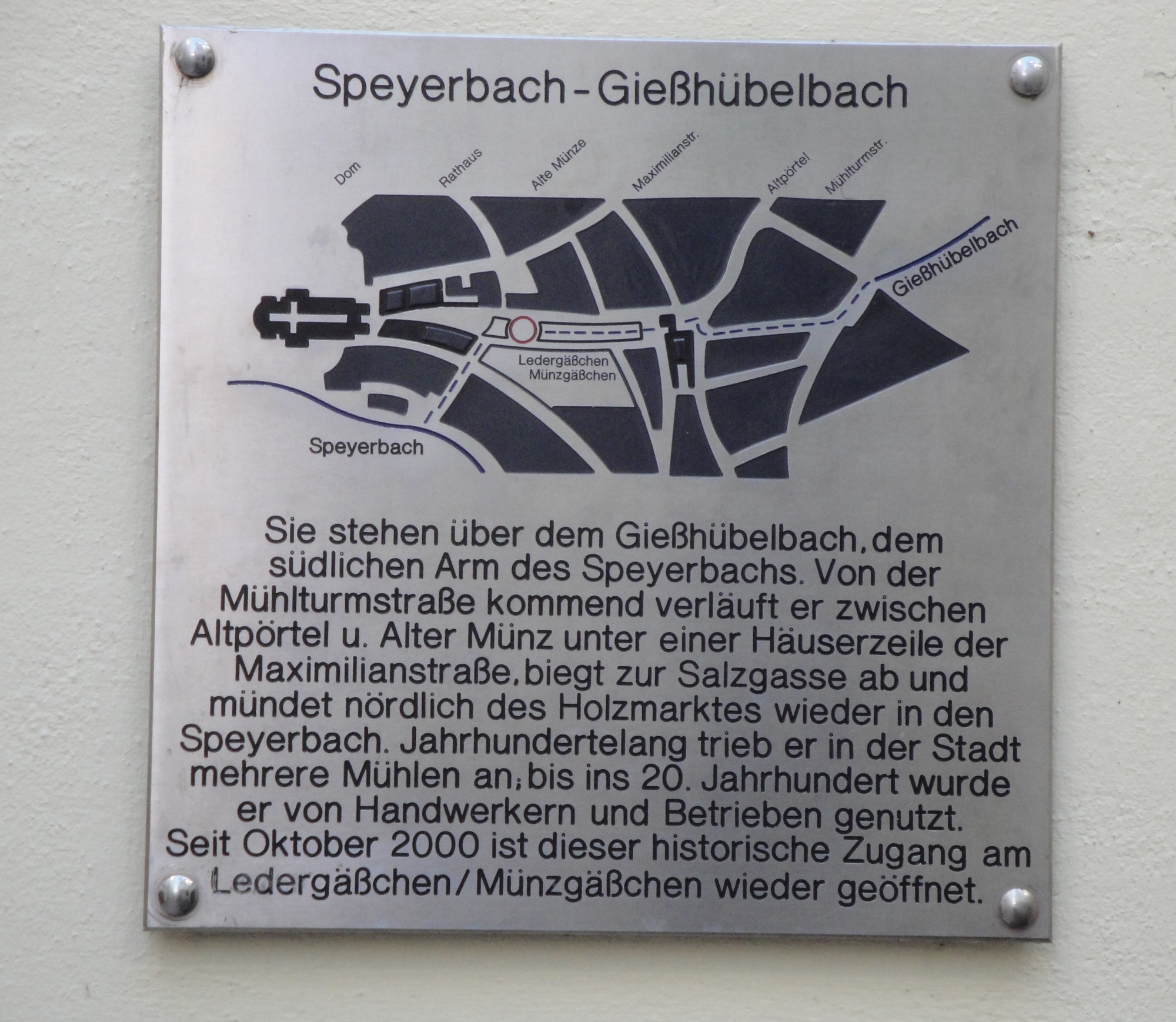
Course of the Gießhübelbach through Speyer

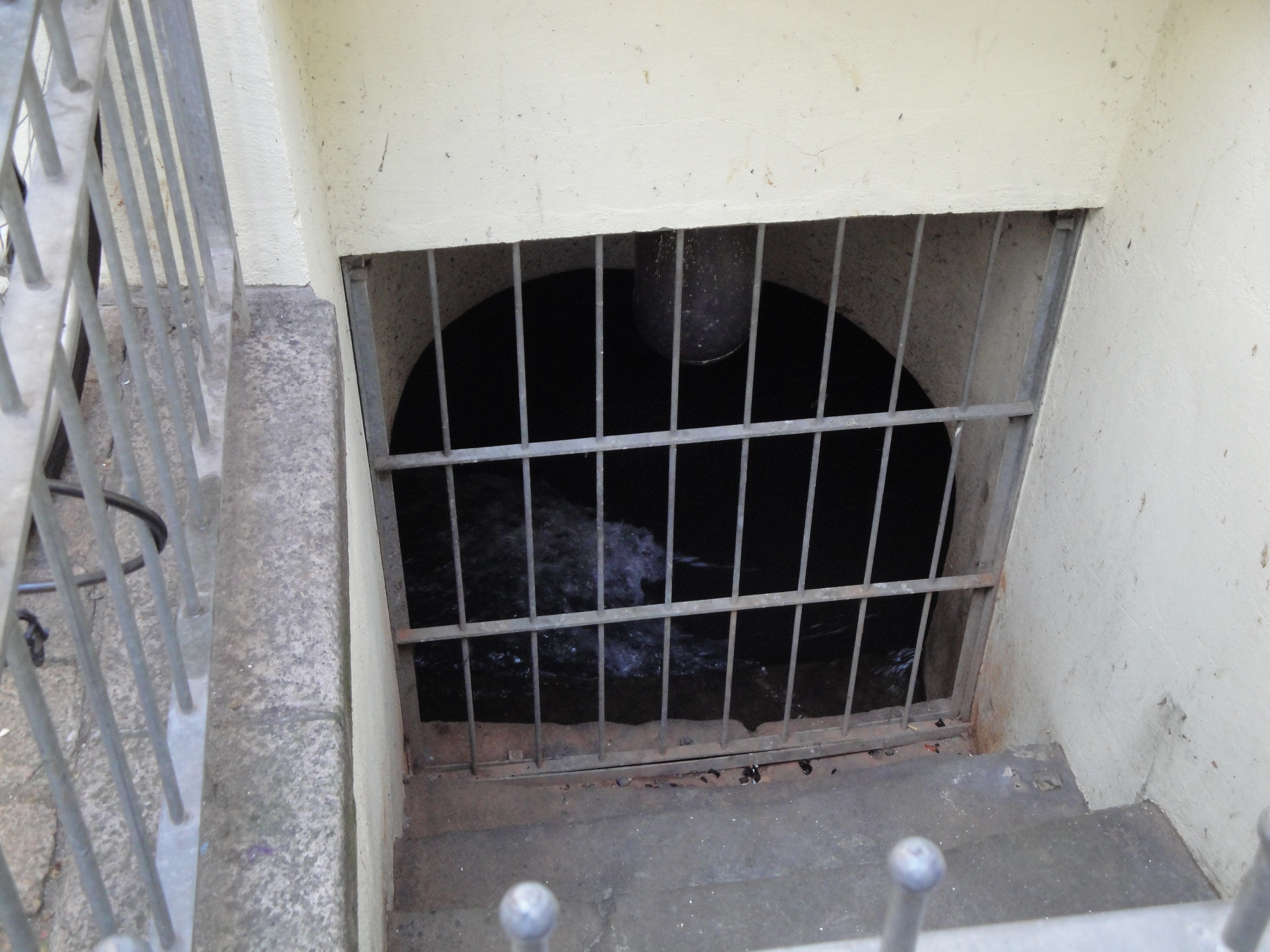
The Gießhübelbach below the historic town centre of Speyer

The Speyerbach (German pronunciation: [ˈʃpaɪɐbax]) is a left tributary of the Rhine in the Palatinate part of Rhineland-Palatinate, Germany. At Speyer, the river splits into the Gießhübelbach and the Woogbach. The Woogbach assumes the name Nonnenbach, then flows into Gießhübelbach shortly before the latter flows into the Rhine.

== Importance ==
Although only classified as a river of the third rank under German river classification system, the Speyerbach is the largest river of the Anterior Palatinate. It is 60 kilometres (37 mi) long; its catchment area is 596 square kilometres (230 mi^{2}); its discharge varies between 1 and 5 cubic metres per second (35 and 177 cu ft/s). In extreme weather conditions with heavy rain in a short time, the discharge may be much higher; the highest peak was 19.5 cubic metres per second (690 cu ft/s) on 25 May 1978.

== Course ==
The nominal source of the Speyerbach is located near the hamlet of Speyerbrunn in the municipality of Elmstein, in the middle of the Palatinate Forest, east of the Palatine Watershed. It has an elevation of 296 metres (971 ft) AMSL; the surrounding Frankenweide hills climbing up to 609 metres (1,998 ft) in height (Eschkopf). Soon after its nominal source, it is joined by the much larger Erlenbach, which rises at the Hussars Fountain, 5 kilometres (3 mi) further south, on the Eschkopf, at an elevation of 460 metres (1,510 ft). So, hydrologically speaking, the Hussars Fountain is the true source of Speyerbach.

From the Speyerbrunn, the Speyerbrunn winds through the narrow Elmstein valley, flowing east at first, then north-east, flowing past the main village of Elmstein. Above the valley, the ruins of four castles are lined in a row. Erfenstein Castle and Spangenberg Castle are well known from the Legend of the Leather Bridge. About 5 kilometres (3 mi) downstream from Elmstein, the Helmbach flows into the Speyerbach at the hamlet of the same name.

Below Frankeneck, where the broader Lambrecht valley begins, the Speyerbach takes from the left's most important water supplier, the nearly 20-kilometre (12 mi) long Hochspeyerbach, and changes its direction to the southeast. The small town of Lambrecht spreads on both sides of the river.

The Speyerbach breaks the eastern ridge of the Palatinate Forest shortly before Neustadt an der Weinstrasse. The ridge is about 300 metres (980 ft) above the river. On the left above the valley are the ruins of Wolfsburg Castle and Winzingen Castle, on the site where Haardter Castle was later erected. About 3 kilometres (2 mi) to the right of the valley is Hambach Castle, the symbol of the German democracy movement, which had an early peak with the Hambach festival of 1832.

In Neustadt an der Weinstrasse the Rehbach splits off to the left at the Winzinger Wassergescheid, carrying one third of the water. The Speyerbach then flows through a narrow valley in the hill country of the German Wine Route; both sides of the valley are lined with vineyards. It then continues through the Upper Rhine Valley, in a South-Easterly direction. In Speyerdorf the Ranschgraben splits off to the left. Here, the Speyerbach flows through the municipalities of Hanhofen and Dudenhofen. At the Hanhofer Wassergescheid, the Mühlbachgraben joins from the right, and the Woogbach split off on the left, taking half the water. Two more tributaries join in the next 3 kilometres: the Modenbach and the Hainbach. In Speyer, the Woogbach rejoins, and then the Speyerbach flows into the Rhine in the port of Speyer, at Rhine kilometre mark 400.3.

== Tributaries ==
- Erlenbach (right), 4.9 km (3.0 mi)
- Schwarzenbach (left), 3.8 km (2.4 mi)
- Enkenbach (left), 26 km (16 mi)
- Mückentalbach (left), 0.9 km (0.56 mi)
- Weltersbach (left), 2.8 km (1.7 mi)
- Oselbach (left), 2.1 km (1.3 mi)
- Legelbach (left), 4.2 km (2.6 mi)
- Möllbach (right), 1.1 km (0.68 mi)
- Haselbach (right), 3.2 km (2.0 mi)
- Helmbach (right), 11.0 km (6.8 mi)
- Argenbach (right), 5.5 km (3.4 mi)
- Breitenbach (left), 6.7 km (4.2 mi)
- Erfensteinertalbach (left), 1.5 km (0.93 mi)
- Höllischtalbächlein (right), 2.7 km (1.7 mi)
- Esthalbach (left), 4.4 km (2.7 mi)
- Hochspeyerbach (left), 21.3 km (13.2 mi)
- Luhrbach (left), 2.0 km (1.2 mi)
- Schlangentalbach (left), 3.8 km (2.4 mi)
- Heidenbrunnertalbach (right), 4.1 km (2.5 mi)
- Kaltenbrunnertalbach (right), 6.6 km (4.1 mi)
- Rehbach (left), 29.0 km (18.0 mi) (distributary)
- Bürgergraben (a.k.a. Enggraben) (right)

== History ==
In the past, the Speyerbach was an important freight transport route for timber. Transportation was done by drifting of logs or timber up to about 1.40 metres (4.6 ft) long; the water discharge was too low for rafts made of tree trunks. The timber was collected before being left in artificial ponds called Woogen or Klausen, to be drifted in spring, as the snow melt began. The timing was crucial, because during the drifting season, the water mills, sawmills and iron works could not be operated and mill workers had to be paid compensation. In an account from 1832, head teacher W. Häge reported the presence, in Elmstein Valley alone, of three mills, five sawmills, one forge and one paper mill, all of which the drifters had to take into account. Drifting on the Speyerbach was regulated by a "drifting order" of 1320, which decreed that drifting had to be completed on St George's Day (23 April).

After the palatinate had come under Bavarian rule in 1816, drifting on the Speyerbach and other rivers was expanded. In 1822, a "Drifting Office" was opened in Neustadt. When in 1852, a "Drifting Master's Office" was established in Elmstein, the Neustadt had more than 140 km of drifting waters. From 1882 onwards, drifting was gradually abandoned. On the Speyerbach, drifting was practised until 1902, but only above Frankeneck. The last drift contained 6193 stère of timber.

The middle and lower reaches of today's Speyerbach, are largely the product of human intervention, both in terms of its course and its being canalized. The meanders that existed during the Spanish Succession War led to the undoing of both French and Imperial troops during the Battle of Speyerbach in September 1703.

The elimination of the former meanders causes frequent floods, because overflow areas are now missing. In built-up areas, the aesthetics of the river suffered from the canalization and covering. In Neustadt both the Speyerbach and the Rehbach have largely disappeared from view during the second half of the twentieth century. In the first decade of the 21st century, the rivers were partially restored, in order to form a green corridor. The project was completed in June 2010, at a cost of 2.7 million euro, most of which was paid by the state of Rhineland-Palatinate

The lower reaches of the Speyerbach, east of Neustadt, flowing South-East to Speyer were probably created by the Romans to transport timberfrom the Palatinate Forest to Noviomagus Nemetum, the Germanic precursor of Speyer. The water level in this section is up to 3 metres (10 ft) above the surrounding terrain. Previously, it probably followed a more northerly course, south of Haßloch and then along the course of the current Ranschgraben, taking up the Rehbach near Limburgerhof-Rehhütte and flowing into the Rhine between Altrincham and Ludwigshafen.

The distributaries Rehbach (splitting off at Neustadt) and Woogbach (at Hanhofen) are both artificial; they were created in the Late Middle Ages.

== Tourist attractions ==
=== Castles ===
The ruins of Elmstein Castle, above Elmstein on the southwestern edge of the 458-metre (1,503 ft) high castle hill, is privately owned and can only be viewed from the outside. In the hamlet of Breitenstein are the ruins of Breitenstein Castle; just over 1 kilometre (0.6 mi) down the Speyerbach from the hamlet of Erfenstein and on the left are the ruins of Erfenstein Castle, on the right those of Spangenberg Castle.

=== Forest service museum ===
The Forestry Museum Elmstein, situated in the house of Heinrich Haag, the last blacksmith, provides the public since 1990 with information about working in the forest, including drifting on the Speyerbach.

=== Drift path ===
Otto Feyock, a retired ranger, has created the Drift Path Elmstein. It has large information panels and starts in the Appenthal part of Elmstein.

=== Museum railway line ===
The Cuckoo Railway (Kuckucksbähnel), a heritage railway line, runs historic steam locomotives and carriages between Neustadt and Elmstein. The reactivated part of the track from Lambrecht to Elmstein follows the Speyerbach and just under 13 kilometres (8 mi) long.

=== Mills ===
The Frohnmühle Mill on Speyerbach between Haßloch and the Neustadt district of Geinsheim is a mill in working order. It contains a Green restaurant and has a weeping willow classified a green monument.

The Aumühle Mill between Haßloch Hanhofen is another mill with a waterwheel in working order, as well as an appreciated restaurant.

=== Leisure facilities ===
Near the Speyerbach are Holiday Park and a pony farm with a stud farm.

== Economy and infrastructure ==
=== Economy ===
Because the raw material (wood) and a supply of energy (water) were available next to each other, large paper mills developed in Lambrecht valley in the 19th century. Because this was very labor-intensive work, they were at the time very important for the regional labor market. The paper mills still exist today, although technological progress has led to job cuts.

=== Transport ===
Federal road B39 Frankenstein – Neustadt – Speyer and the Palatine Ludwigsbahn railroad line between Saarbrücken and Mannheim run side by side through Lambrecht valley. The previously abandoned Cuckoo Railway line from Lambrecht to Elmstein was reactivated in 1984.

== See also ==
- List of rivers of Rhineland-Palatinate
