= Elmstein =

- Municipality
- Coat of arms

- Location of Elmstein within Bad Dürkheim district
- Interactive map of Elmstein
- Location within Germany Location within Rhineland-Palatinate
- Coordinates: 49°21′02″N 07°56′24″E
- Country: Germany
- State: Rhineland-Palatinate
- District: Bad Dürkheim
- Municipal assoc.: Lambrecht (Pfalz)
- Subdivisions: 10

Government
  - Mayor (2019–24): Rene Verdaasdonk (SPD)

Area
  - Total: 75.69 km^{2} (29.22 sq mi)
- Elevation: 225 m (738 ft)

Population (2025-12-31)
  - Total: 4,131
  - Density: 54.58/km^{2} (141.4/sq mi)
- Time zone: UTC+01:00 (CET)
  - Summer (DST): UTC+02:00 (CEST)
- Postal codes: 67471
- Dialling codes: 06328, 06306
- Vehicle registration: DÜW
- Website: www.elmstein.de

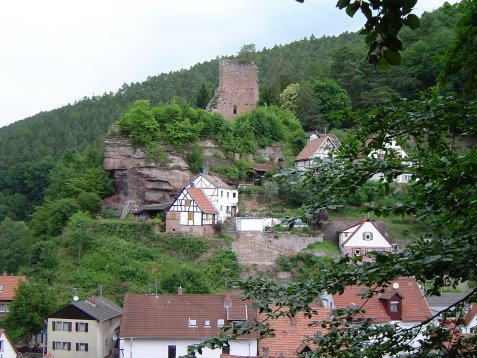
Elmstein – village and ruins

Elmstein is an Ortsgemeinde – a municipality belonging to a Verbandsgemeinde, a kind of collective municipality – in the Bad Dürkheim district in Rhineland-Palatinate, Germany.

== Geography ==
=== Location ===
Elmstein lies in the Palatinate Forest. The municipality belongs to the Verbandsgemeinde of Lambrecht, whose seat is in the like-named town.

=== Constituent communities ===
Elmstein's Ortsteile are, besides the namesake one, Appenthal, Erlenbach, Harzofen, Helmbach, Iggelbach, Mückenwiese, Röderthal, Schafhof, Schwabenbach, Schwarzbach, Stilles Tal, Speyerbrunn and Wolfsgrube.

=== Neighbouring municipalities ===
Clockwise from the northwest, these are Waldleiningen, Weidenthal, Esthal, an exclave of Kirrweiler, an exclave of Venningen, an exclave of Rhodt unter Rietburg, an exclave of Edesheim, an exclave of Landau in der Pfalz, Wilgartswiesen, Trippstadt and Kaiserslautern.

== History ==
Elmstein arose from the Castle Elmstein, which itself was built in the 12th century by the Counts Palatine of the Rhine. The outlying centres arose later, mostly as extension settlements for lumberjacks, as a location of a sawmill or, like Röderthal, as a mining settlement.

On 1 January 1976, a centre with 207 inhabitants was transferred from the municipality of Wilgartswiesen to Elmstein.

=== Religion ===
In 2007, 51.5% of the inhabitants were Evangelical and 30.3% were Catholic. One peculiarity is the Free Religious Community founded in 1921, which with a roughly 5% share of the population stands as the Palatinate’s second biggest Free Religious Community. The rest practised other faiths or none.

== Politics ==
=== Municipal council ===
The council is made up of 20 council members, who were elected at the municipal election held on 7 June 2009, and the honorary mayor as chairman.

The municipal election held on 7 June 2009 yielded the following results:

	SPD	CDU	Independent	WG Herter	Total
2009	5	8	1	6	20 seats
2004	9	9	2	-	20 seats

=== Coat of arms ===
The German blazon reads: In Silber zwei gekreuzte rote Doppelhaken, bewinkelt von vier sechsstrahligen goldenen Sternen.

The municipality's arms might in English heraldic language be described thus: Argent two cramps per cross gules, the one per fess surmounting the one per pale, between four mullets Or.

The arms were approved by the Reich governor in Bavaria (of which the Palatinate was an outlying part until after the Second World War) and date from a 1772 seal. The “forest hooks” refer to Elmstein's location in the middle of the forest (this charge is generally known as a “cramp” or “crampoon” in English heraldry, and is held to be a kind of brace for strengthening a building). It is unknown, however, what the mullets (stars) mean.

== Culture and sightseeing ==
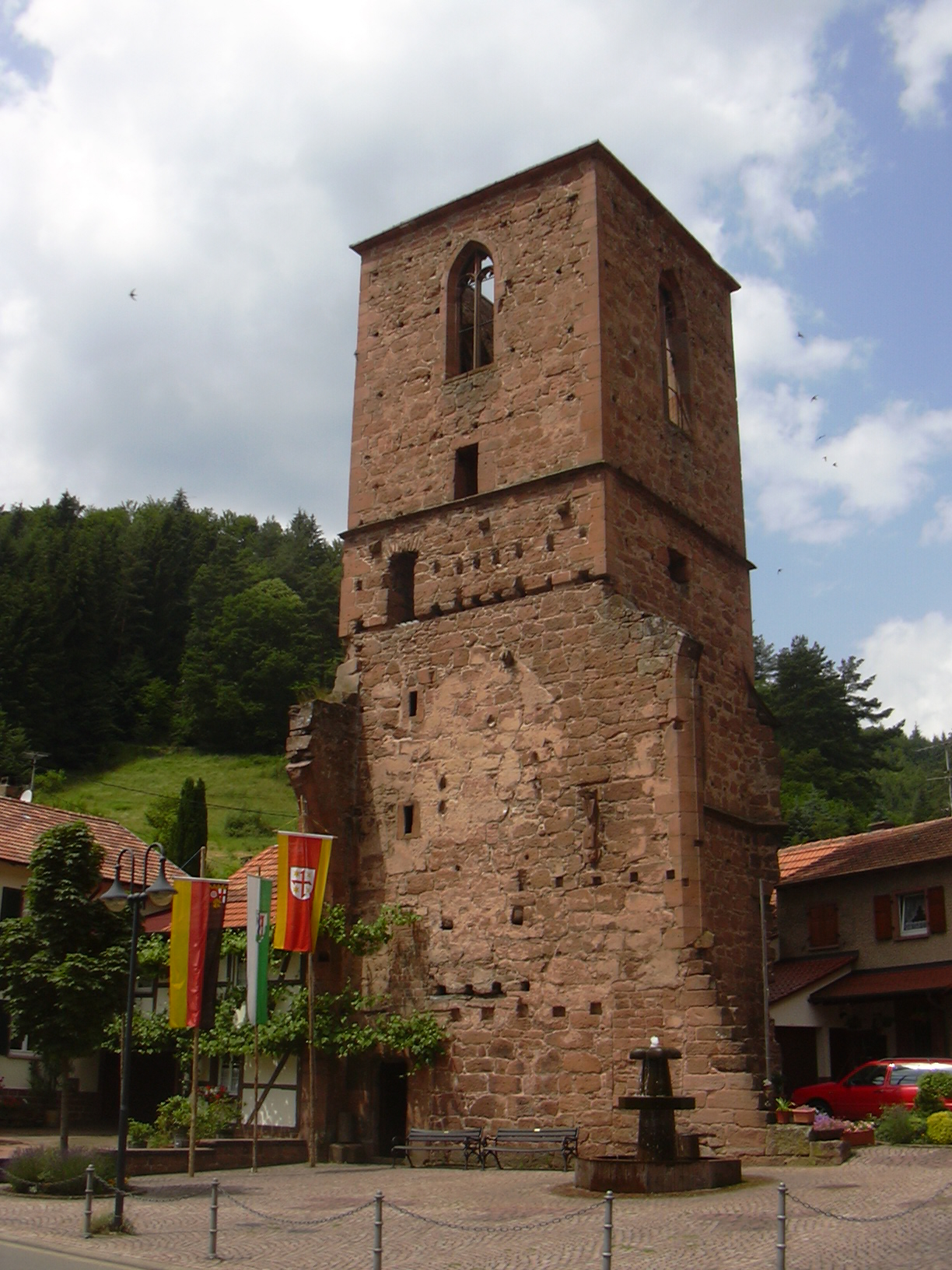
Appenthal churchtower ruins

=== Museums ===
- Waldarbeitsmuseum Elmstein (Collection about the history of logging)

=== Buildings ===
- Wappenschmiede Elmstein (historic, water-powered smithy)
- Water-powered sawmill in the Elmsteiner valley
- Geisskopf estate ruins near the Geisswiese (meadow, near Helmbach)
- Electoral Palatinate hunting lodge (Elmstein's oldest house) with:
- Wine cellar building from 1754 (the Verbandsgemeinde’s oldest such building)
- Katholische Kirche Herz Mariä (“Catholic Church of Mary’s Heart”) in Elmstein (architect Albert Boßlet, built 1950–52)
- Katholische Kirche Mariä Heimsuchung (“Catholic Church of the Visitation, built 1765) with historical Schlimbach organ (1887)
- Elmstein Protestant Church
- Elmstein Castle ruins
- Appenthal churchtower ruins, once part of the Pilgrimage Church of Mary, built in 1488.
- Katholische Kirche St. Wendelinus und St. Hubertus (“Saint Wendelin’s and Saint Hubertus’s Catholic Church”) in Speyerbrunn, built in 1931/1932
- Historical timber rafting sites near Erlenbach and in the Legelbach valley between Mückenwiese and Elmstein
- Belltower in Iggelbach, built in 1889
- Belltower in Appenthal with historical set of bells

== Economy and infrastructure ==
=== Transport ===
Running from Neustadt an der Weinstraße to Elmstein is the heritage railway known as the Kuckucksbähnel (Little Cuckoo Railway).

The municipality can be reached on Landesstraße (State Road) 499 from either Johanniskreuz or Frankeneck

Moreover, there is a bus link with route 517 (Neustadt an der Weinstraße to Iggelbach). The travel time on the bus is roughly an hour.

Owing to the many motorcycle accidents in the past, the road through the Elmstein valley (Johanniskreuz–Elmstein–Lambrecht) is closed to motorcycles on weekends from April to October; only residents – not even other locals – may drive motorcycles on this stretch of highway at these times.

== Famous people ==
=== Sons and daughters of the town ===
- Rudolf Kühner (1952– ), politician

== Sources ==
- Elmsteiner Heimatschriften Nr.1 Februar 2000
- Elmsteiner Heimatschriften Nr.2 Juni 2000
