= Karl August von Beckers zu Westerstetten =

Bavarian count and infantry general

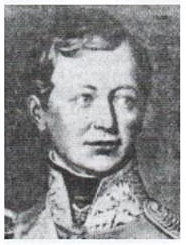
Karl August von Beckers zu Westerstetten

Count Karl August von Beckers zu Westerstetten (8 August 1770 in Mußbach, Palatinate – 8 November 1832 in Munich) was a Bavarian infantry general.

== Biography ==
In 1774, Karl August von Beckers zu Westerstetten became honorary ensign in the Electoral Palatinate Leibregiment in Mannheim. In 1784 he became a lieutenant in the Palatinate Count von Birkenfeld regiment, where he became a captain in 1787. In 1790 he fought in the 4th Palatinate Grenadier Regiment against the Liège revolutionaries. He also took part in battles against France in 1794 and 1795. In 1795, he was promoted to major in the 3rd Grenadier Regiment, and in 1805 he became a colonel.

== Literature ==
- Friedrich Münich: From the Life of His Highness by Prince Carl Theodor von Thurn and Taxis, Munich, 1869, page 180; (Digital scan)
- F. von Fabrice: The Royal Bavarian 6th Infantry Regiment "Kaiser Wilhelm, König von Preussen", Part 2 (1805 to 1835), page 3, Oldenbourg Verlag, 1896; (Clipping scan)
- Walter Schärl: Munich Historical Studies: Department of Bavarian History, Volume 1, 1955, page 246; (Clipping scan)
- New German Necrology, 10th year (1834), Part 2, Ilmenau, 1834, page 972; (Digital scan)
- Ernst Heinrich Kneschke: German Count's Houses of the Present, Volume 1, Leipzig, 1852, page 59; (Digital scan)
- Pierer's Universal Lexicon, Volume 2. Altenburg 1857, p. 469; (Online view)
- Carl von Landmann : Beckers, Karl Graf von . In: General German Biography (ADB). Volume 2, Duncker & Humblot, Leipzig 1875, p. 235 f.
