= Siamese occupation of Germany =

Zone of Thai occupation in postwar Germany (1918-1919)

- Territory under Siamese military administration of the Kingdom of Siam
- 1918–1919
- Unit Colour of the Siamese Expeditionary Force

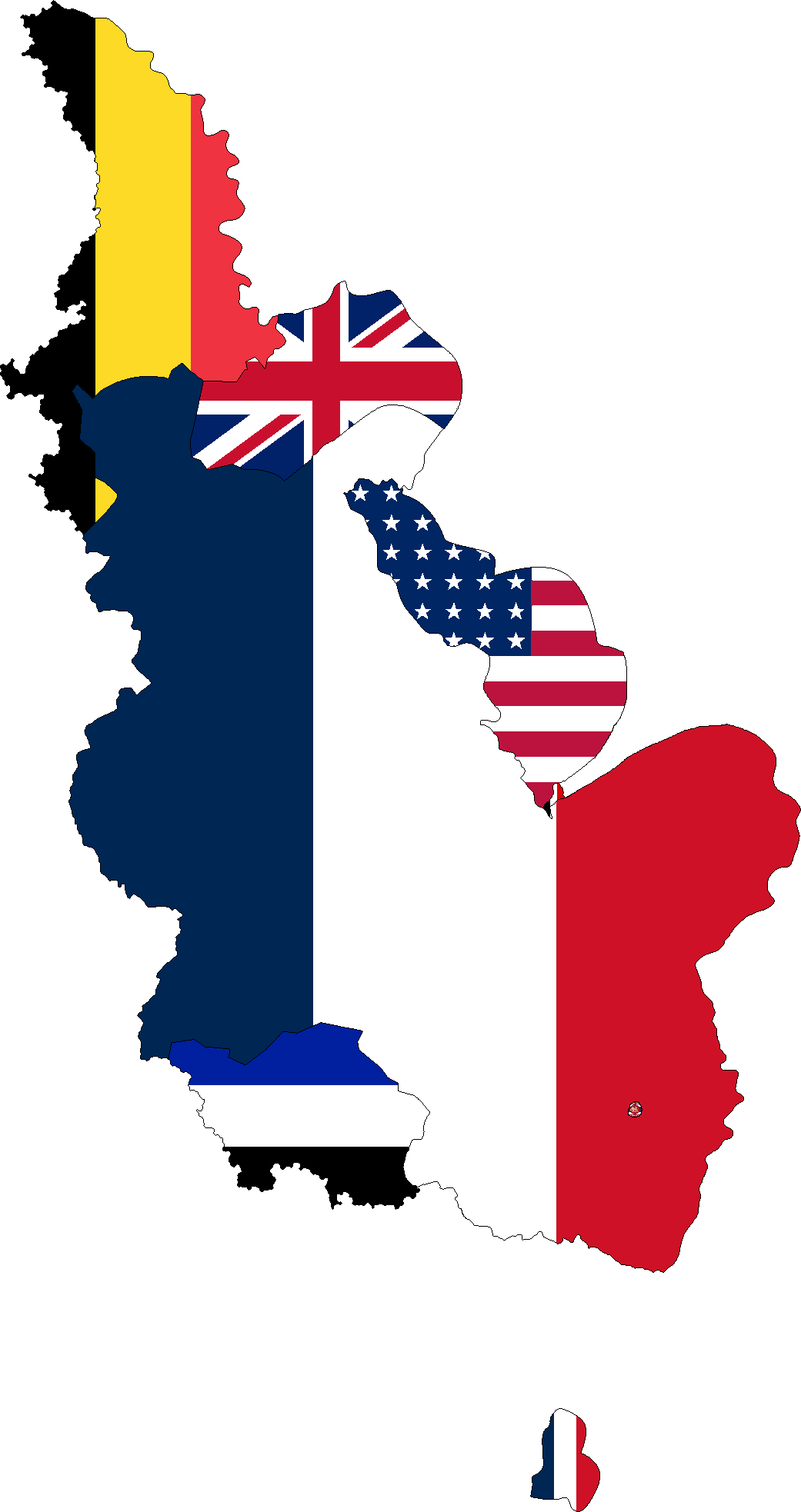
- The Rhineland was occupied by the Entente powers. The Siamese enclave, surrounded by the French occupation zone, was located to the southeast.
- Capital: Neustadt an der Weinstraße
- Population
- c. 20.000 people
- Government
  - Type: Military occupation
- King of Siam
  - 1918–1919: Rama VI
- Commander of the Siamese Expeditionary Forces
  - 1918–1919: Phat Thephatsadin na Ayutthaya
- Historical era: First World War
  - Establishment: 15 December 1918
  - French troops takeover: 10 July 1919
Preceded by	Succeeded by
French-occupied; Germany	French-occupied; Germany

The Siamese occupation of Germany (German: Siamesische Besetzung Deutschlands, Thai: การยึดครองเยอรมนีของสยาม) was a small enclave within the Rhineland occupation zone of Germany in 1918–1919, controlled by Siam (present-day Thailand) and entirely surrounded by the French occupation zone. The occupation pursued political aims: pressuring Germany to sign the Treaty of Versailles, strengthening Siam's alliance with France, and affirming its standing among the victorious powers.

Initiated by the French command after the Armistice of Compiègne, the Siamese occupation mission was also seen by King Vajiravudh as an opportunity to consolidate the nation. During their time in Germany, Siamese soldiers stationed at Mussbach and Hochspeyer faced a harsh winter and an outbreak of Spanish flu, which caused some fatalities. Despite initial difficulties and the language barrier, relationships formed between the Siamese servicemen and the local German population — relationships that were nonetheless viewed with ambivalence, including within the Siamese corps itself.

The occupation ended with Siamese units taking part in the Allied victory parades in Paris, London, and Brussels, symbolising international recognition of Siam's contribution.

== Background ==
In April 1917, when President Woodrow Wilson declared war on Germany, it was clear that US entry into World War I would probably turn the tide against the Central Powers (Austria-Hungary, Germany, Bulgaria, and the Ottoman Empire). Waiting on the sidelines and watching, King Vajiravudh (Rama VI) pondered his options. Thailand (Siam) had maintained neutrality since the outbreak of World War I in 1914, and the country had maintained friendly relations with Germany, but the monarch understood the political value of casting his lot with the Entente forces.

King Vajiravudh believed that joining the war offered Thailand a chance to achieve equal standing with other nations. The country had already lost control of Cambodia and Laos and ceded southern provinces between 1889 and 1909 due to British and especially French imperial ambitions, and it had been forced to accept extraterritorial rights for citizens of the UK, France, and the US. The king hoped that participating in the war would create an opening to revise these unequal treaties.

As the only expeditionary force fielded by an independent Southeast Asian country, the Siamese Expeditionary Force took part in the fighting in Europe during the First World War. Its relations with France, however, were marred by language misunderstandings and racist conduct on the part of the French command. The situation deteriorated to the point that the Siamese king and his senior advisers considered cutting the expeditionary corps' deployment short.

However, an armistice was signed on 11 November, and the fighting stopped. After the war, the French Ministry of Foreign Affairs pressed the military command into ordering the Siamese corps to move onto German territory behind its own troops. On 3 December 1918 the first French occupation troops arrived at Geinsheim, and were relieved on 15 December 1918 by 200 soldiers of the Siamese motor detachment. Thai forces occupied the German town of Neustadt an der Weinstraße as part of the occupation of the defeated enemy country, officially from 16 December 1918. The main tasks of the Siamese occupation troops were enforcing the terms of the armistice and pressuring Germany to sign the Treaty of Versailles.

This occupation was less a military necessity than a political move to smooth over strained Franco-Siamese relations —an arrangement that suited both the military command in Europe and the king in Bangkok. The Siamese were ready to leave old hostilities behind and focus on the political benefits to be gained from the enormous effort of deploying troops to Europe. The Thai occupation of Germany would have seemed unthinkable just a decade earlier.

== Course of the occupation ==
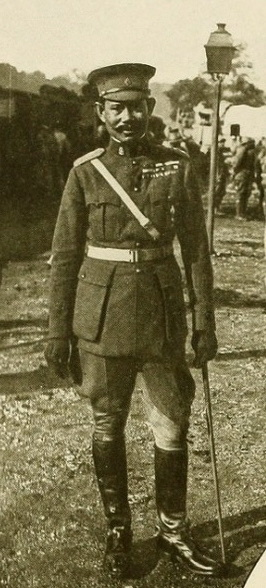
Major General Phraya Pichai Charnyarit (Phad Devahastin Na Ayudhaya), commander of the Siamese Expeditionary Forces.

In July 1917, despite the fears of some members of the royal government, King Rama VI declared war on Austria-Hungary and Germany. Thai forces interned and then confiscated at least 12 ocean-going ships of the North German Line as war reparations.

Siam sent an expeditionary force of 1,284 volunteers, led by Phraya Thephatsadin, to serve alongside French and British forces on the Western Front, including a contingent from the Army Air Corps. The troops arrived in France on 7 December 1918, and aviation personnel began training at French flying schools in Avord and Istres. More than 95 qualified as pilots (they were sent to gunnery school at Biscarrosse), with some sent on to gunnery, bomber, and reconnaissance schools. The sources differ on whether Thai pilots flew combat sorties in the war's final weeks or finished training too late to see action.

On 3 December 1918, the first French occupation troops reached Geinsheim; they were relieved on 15 December by 200 soldiers of the Siamese Automobile Detachment, who occupied the German town of Neustadt an der Weinstraße the following day. The Siamese motor corps remained in the Rhenish Palatinate —chiefly around Neustadt— from December 1918 to July 1919, with headquarters at the Hotel zum Löwen near the train station and troops distributed between Mußbach, Geinsheim, and Hochspeyer. The corps kept public order and demanded respect from the roughly 20,000 Germans under its authority, but acted with restraint; limited language skills meant the French usually served as intermediaries, and few conflicts with locals arose beyond some soldiers forming relationships with German women.

Conditions improved after the armistice, aided by local produce and tinned food shipped from Siam. The troops celebrated Christmas and the king's birthday (1 January 1919) together with their French allies at the Hotel zum Löwen with a feast, champagne, and Thai music. Daily life was otherwise quiet, filled with sports such as Muay Thai, which so impressed the French that they organized a joint sports festival in Metz in April 1919.

The harsh Rhineland winter took a heavy toll on troops from a tropical climate: nearly continuous snowfall in late 1918 and early 1919, combined with inadequate nutrition, caused frostbite, lung disease, and trench foot. Of the 19 total deaths, about half were attributed to the Spanish flu pandemic, while nearly half of all deaths were linked to cold exposure, including eight men officially recorded as dying of pneumonia brought on by hypothermia. No Siamese soldier died from combat or enemy fire.

On 19 July 1919, the Thai contingent marched in the victory parade in Paris before returning home in September. Thailand also took part in the Paris Peace Conference and, in January 1920, became a founding member of the League of Nations. The king's gamble paid off: the United States relinquished its extraterritorial rights in September 1920, France followed in 1925 after prolonged negotiations, and Britain signed a corresponding treaty that same July.

== Interactions and attitudes ==
=== Siamese reactions ===
King Vajiravudh welcomed the Allies' proposal that Siam take part in the occupation of Germany, seeing in it a chance to be counted among the war's victors and to defend his country's interests at the Paris Peace Conference. On 17 December 1918, the king received a telegram reporting that Siamese troops, together with the Allied occupation army, had crossed into Germany. His reaction was published in a local newspaper, in which he called the day his troops set foot on German soil the proudest day of his life. The episode served the king's wish to present himself as a soldier-king and comrade of the troops. He also sought to use Siam's participation in the war as a means of strengthening national unity and patriotism, with the soldier-king positioned at the centre of the nation and its war effort.

It was the proudest day in my life when I learnt that my troops had advanced into enemy territory, and the memory of this glorious event will ever live in mind as an incentive to further sacrifice on behalf of my beloved nation and motherland. (King Vajiravudh)

Since the Spanish flu was not recognised as viral until 1933, rumours initially circulated among the Siamese that the illness had been caused by German poison. These rumours died down once German residents gave them soap and chocolate, and some German women followed the Siamese on the civilian train to their final billets in Hochspeyer. The Siamese occupation troops were struck by everyday life in Germany, which seemed largely untouched by the war apart from food shortages. They were taken by the beauty of German women, and, despite the language barrier, some Siamese soldiers formed relationships with them. The nature of these relationships is not well studied, though at least two Siamese memoirists mention cases of fellow soldiers "taking wives". They also describe the emotional reaction of some women on learning that the Siamese troops would be departing in June.

Siamese servicemen retained positive memories of their time in occupied Germany. According to the recollections of Siamese Sergeant Kaysorn, the Germans' initial reception was cold, and he himself had to overcome an inner aversion to recent enemies. Relationships warmed over time, though Kaysorn expressed disappointment at fellow soldiers who took up with German women, believing this disgraced the Siamese army.

=== German population's reaction ===
This may have been the first time the population of the occupied territory had ever seen Asians. The local German papers Pfälzischer Burger Zeitung, General Anzeiger, and Stadt und Dorf Anzeige made no mention of the Siamese armed forces, mistakenly assuming they were French colonial troops — but Siam had never been anyone's colony. Pfälzischer Burger Zeitung, for instance, reported that half the Palatinate had been occupied by French troops by 6 December 1918, and that several new units had arrived that day. On 7 December, the evening paper Stadt und Dorf Anzeige reported that "around 300 men of colonial troops" with several officers had got off the train from Kaiserslautern at 1:45 pm and, wearing helmets and carrying rifles and pistols at the ready, marched along Friedrichstraße toward the village of Mußbach. These were "Frenchmen and Moroccans ... dark-skinned and Black ...". A further "500 colonial soldiers" were reported to be arriving that afternoon and to be billeted at the school. No Siamese soldiers, or any non-French allies, were mentioned. The American Black press of the period, in covering the makeup of the occupation forces in the Rhineland, likewise listed Siamese troops alongside soldiers from the French colonies of Senegal and North Africa.

Not everyone welcomed contact between German women and the Siamese. The German teacher Karl Berg wrote that the long occupation had also done great moral harm to young people, since many young girls had frequently violated proper conduct and trampled on German honour and character, and that such conditions were bound to act on schoolchildren like poison, with the consequences soon to follow. German nationalist propagandists later cited the presence of dark-skinned troops on German soil as evidence of an assault on German civilisation, a campaign known as the "Black Horror on the Rhine". The relationships with German women mentioned in Siamese soldiers' memoirs were likely part of the wider context of propagandists' allegations of sexual violence supposedly committed by non-European troops during the occupation.

Overall, the occupation was peaceful. There were no uprisings against the Siamese occupiers, and only minor incidents were recorded.

== Education ==
The effects of the war continued to disrupt Germany's education system after it ended: lessons were severely curtailed and often interrupted for years afterward, so normal results could not be expected of pupils, a fact that had to be taken into account. One teacher in Geinsheim, for example, made the following entry in the school logbook on 29 April 1919, noting that in view of the serious difficulties that had beset teaching in most primary schools of the Palatinate, particularly over the previous year, the final and graduation examinations in all primary and continuing-education schools had been cancelled. A guard was permanently posted in the Geinsheim school building. Teacher Karl Berg recorded in his school logbook the disruptive effect of the Siamese occupation troops on lessons, while also expressing relief at the end of the Siamese occupation, noting that the daily running of vehicle engines parked in front of the school had badly disturbed classes, and that the guard posted in the school building made such noise almost daily that pupils' own words could often not be heard, so that calmer days were welcomed with great joy.

== Media ==
External images
- A Siamese soldier helping bring in the harvest for a local family
- Karl Scilling with a Siamese soldier
- Siamese soldiers in front of the school building in Geinsheim
- A Siamese soldier

On Christmas Eve, Stadt und Dorf Anzeige published a table matching French uniform insignia to ranks. There were several advertisements for French-language courses and a number of columns warning the population about the need to guard against "sexual diseases," without specifying how. One advertisement offered "treatment for women's problems," without saying what it treated or by whom. The German civilian population, too, received only scant advice.

== War memorial in Bangkok ==
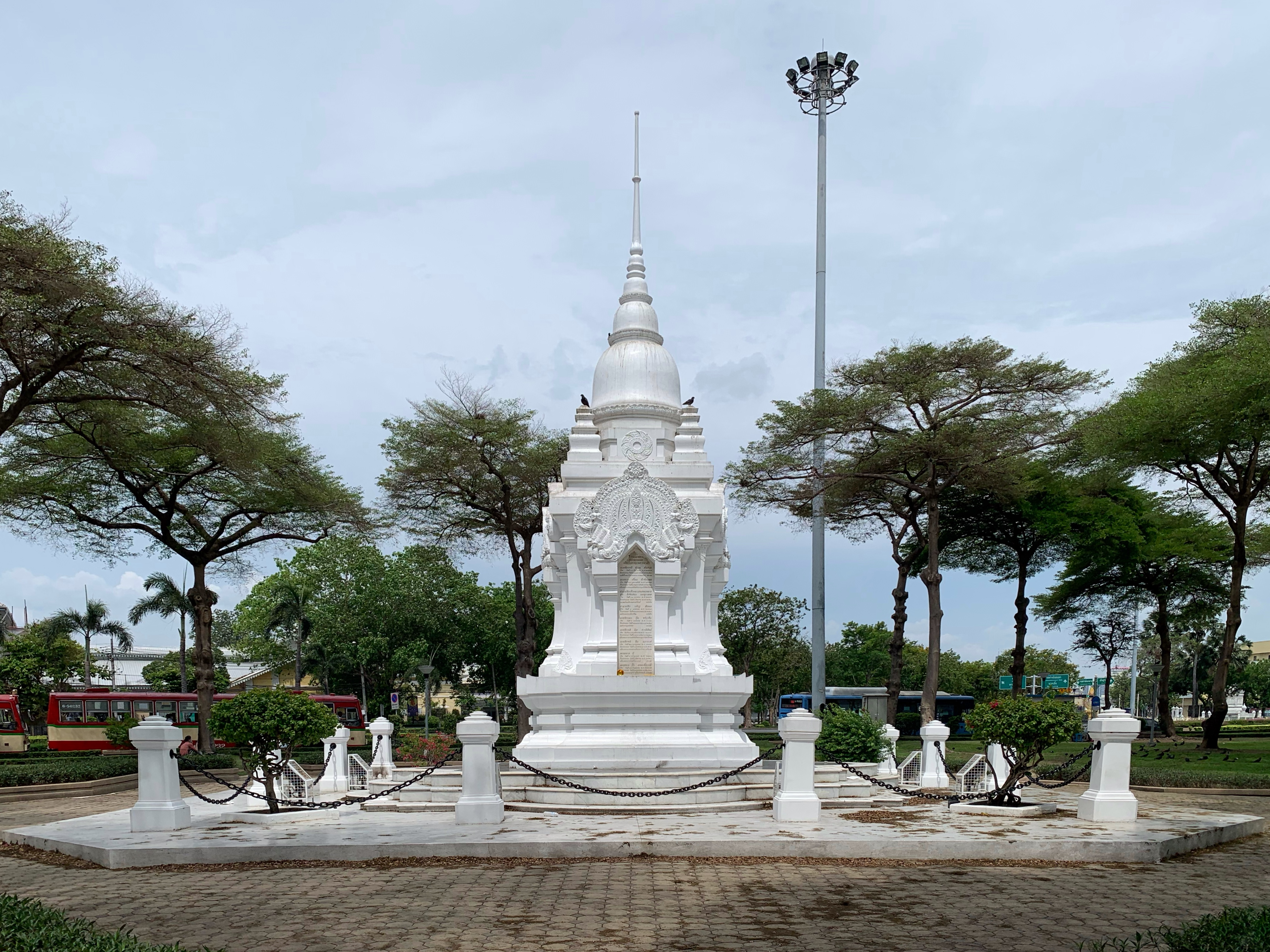
Thai World War Volunteers Memorial in Bangkok

A war memorial, described as a Srivijaya Buddhist stupa, was erected in honor of the Thai soldiers and is located at the northwestern corner of Sanam Luang park in central Bangkok. The monument is called the Volunteer Soldiers' Monument (Thai: อนุสาวรีย์ทหารอาสา) and commemorates the 19 soldiers of the Siamese Expeditionary Force who died during the First World War. The ashes of the nineteen dead were interred in the base of the monument on 24 September 1919.

== See also ==
- Thailand in World War II
- Occupation of the Rhineland
- Siam in World War I
- Rhineland bastard
- Remilitarisation of the Rhineland

== Bibliography ==
- Khwanchai Phusrisom; Stephen Martin (2016). "The Siamese Expeditionary Force of World War I and the Spanish Flu". Hektoen International Journal. Mahasarakham, Thailand. Archived from the original on July 3, 2022.
- Hell, Stefan (2018). "Die thailändische Besatzung Deutschlands". Thailand-Rundschau (in German). 31 (2): 48–52.
- Hell, Stefan (2015). "Siam". 1914-1918-Online International Encyclopedia of the First World War. Berlin: Free University of Berlin. doi:10.15463/IE1418.10596.
- Kästel, Norbert (2014). Der Erste Weltkrieg und Geinsheim in der Pfalz (in German). pp. 60–62.
- Ruth, Richard A. (2024). ""Put this in our Great History"". The Routledge History of the First World War. London: Routledge. doi:10.4324/9781003363439-25. ISBN 978-1-003-36343-9.
