= Haardt Castle =

Coordinates: 49°21′42.31″N 8°8′10.19″E

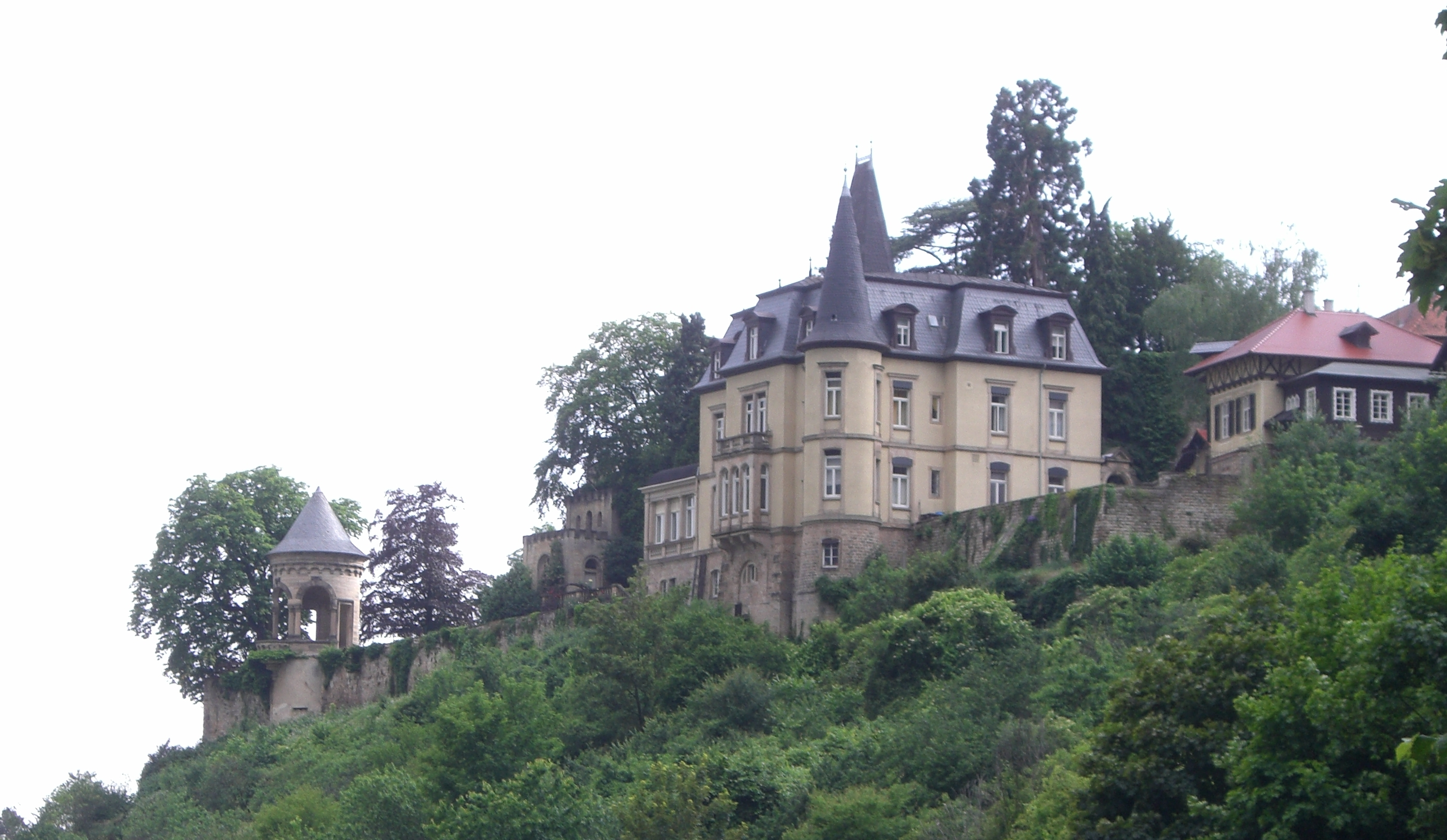
Haardt Castle

Haardt Castle (German: Haardter Schloss [ˈhaːɐ̯tɐ ˈʃlɔs], more rarely also Haardter Schlössel [-ˈʃlœsl̩] due to its daintiness) or Villa Clemm after its builder, is a schloss-like villa in the municipality of Haardt near the town of Neustadt an der Weinstraße in the German state of Rhineland-Palatinate.

== Location ==
Haardt Castle lies on the eastern slopes of the Haardt mountains above the eponymous village on the northeastern edge of the site of the medieval Winzingen Castle, which once belonged to the Counts Palatine of the Rhine.

== History ==
Winzingen Castle was first built in the 10th and 11th centuries and repaired several times after times of war. In 1696, it was so badly damaged by shellfire in the War of the Palatine Succession that, despite provisional repairs, it finally fell into ruins during the 18th century. In 1804, after French Revolutionary Troops had conquered the Left Bank of the Rhine for the French state, the nobility and the church had their estates seized and their land auctioned. As a result, the dilapidated Winzingen Castle and its surrounding land went into private ownership. The wealthy Neustadt businessman, Schuster, converted the estate at considerable expense into a park-like gardens and built the remains of the medieval palas into a wine press hall.

Commerzienrat August Ritter von Clemm, one of the co-founders of BASF, bought the land in 1875 and had the villa built in 1876 in order to use it as a lordly mansion. Not until 1893, when a circular pavilion and a large terrace were completed, did construction work finally end. From 1928 to 1971, Haardt Castle was a Kur and recovery home, and later a hotel and restaurant. In 1971, the current owner bought the entire complex. The main building was restored and converted in 2002, during the course of which 19th century wallpaper was found behind the wall coverings.

== Use today ==
Today, Haardt Castle contains residential accommodations and a guest house. Part of the land is open to the public; but the owner reserves the right to close the estate whenever desired.
