= Wolfsburg Castle, Neustadt =

Castle in Rhineland-Palatinate, Germany

Wolfsburg
- Neustadt an der Weinstraße
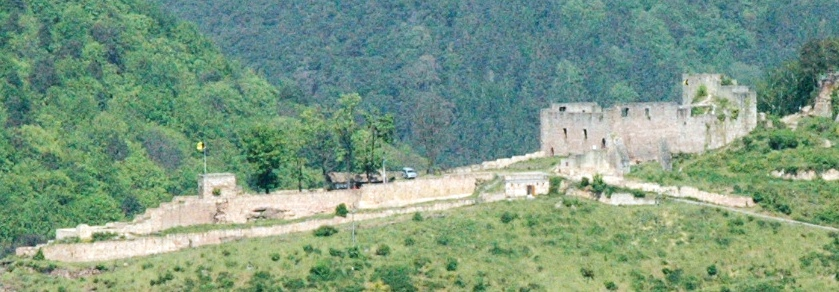
- Ruins of Wolfsburg seen from the Zigeunerfelsen

Site information
- Type: Hill castle
- Code: DE-RP
- Condition: Curtain walls

Location
- Coordinates: 49°21′36″N 8°06′29″E
- Height: 270 m above sea level (NN)

Site history
- Built: 1120 to 1300

Garrison information
- Occupants: Counts, clerics

The ruins of the Wolfsburg by the western approach to Neustadt an der Weinstraße in the German state of Rhineland-Palatinate, lie on a rocky crag on the Wolfsberg hill about 130 metres over the left (northern) bank of the Speyerbach at a height of 270 metres above sea level (NN). From here the original thalweg may still be made out in the direction of Lambrecht, along which traces of Roman settlements were uncovered.

== Literature ==
- Alexander Thon, ed. (2005), "Wie Schwalben Nester an den Felsen geklebt..." – Burgen in der Nordpfalz (in German) (1. ed.), Regensburg: Verlag Schnell und Steiner, pp. 162–165, ISBN 3-7954-1674-4
