= Neustadt an der Weinstraße =

Neustadt an der Weinstraße Naischdadt an de Woischdrooß (Palatine German)
- Town
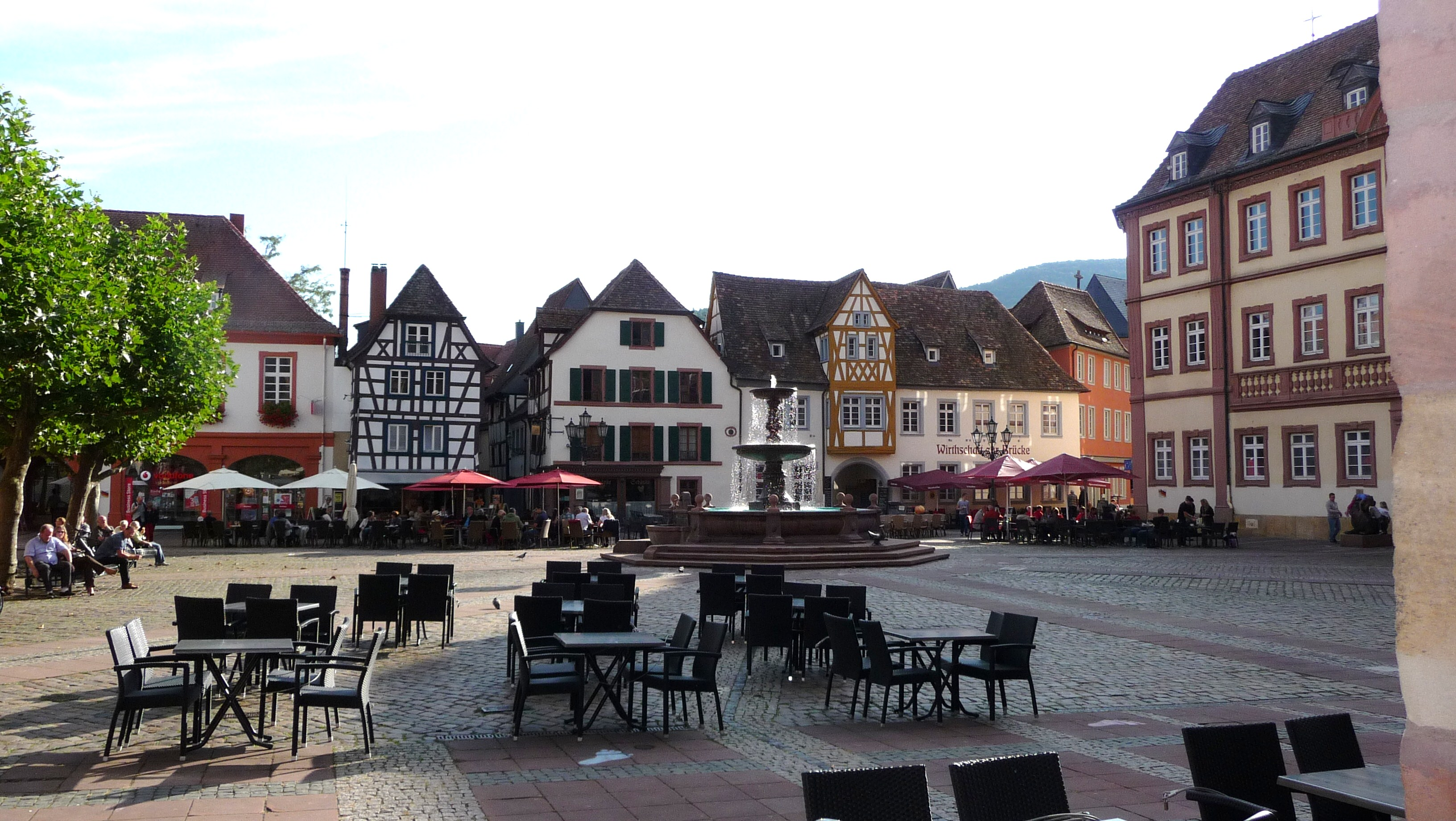
- Market square in the centre of Neustadt (2015)

- Flag Coat of arms
- Interactive map of Neustadt an der Weinstraße
- Location within Germany Location within Rhineland-Palatinate
- Coordinates: 49°21′N 08°09′E
- Country: Germany
- State: Rhineland-Palatinate
- District: Urban district

Government
  - Mayor (2017–25): Marc Weigel (FW)

Area
  - Total: 117.09 km^{2} (45.21 sq mi)
- Elevation: 136 m (446 ft)

Population (2025-12-31)
  - Total: 52,882
  - Density: 451.64/km^{2} (1,169.7/sq mi)
- Time zone: UTC+01:00 (CET)
  - Summer (DST): UTC+02:00 (CEST)
- Postal codes: 67433, 67434, 67435
- Dialling codes: 06321, 06327
- Vehicle registration: NW
- Website: www.neustadt.eu

Neustadt an der Weinstraße (German: [ˈnɔʏʃtat ʔan deːɐ̯ ˈvaɪnˌʃtʁaːsə]; lit. 'New City on the Wine Route'; Palatine German: Naischdadt an de Woischdrooß), formerly known as Neustadt an der Haardt, is a town in Rhineland-Palatinate, Germany. With 53,300 inhabitants as of 2020, it is the largest town called Neustadt.

== Geography ==
=== Location ===
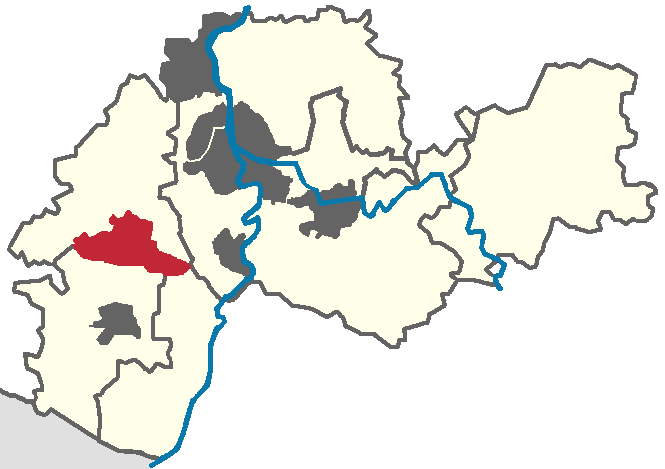
The Rhine-Neckar metropolitan region: Neustadt highlighted in red

The town itself lies in the western part of the Rhine-Neckar Metropolitan Region between the Haardt mountains, the eastern edge of the Palatinate Forest, and the western edge of the Upper Rhine Plain in the middle of the Palatinate wine region, an area that is around 10 km wide and 85 km long. The Speyerbach river flows through the town from west to east as does the Rehbach, which separates from the Speyerbach within the town at the Winzinger Wassergescheid before emptying into the River Rhine several kilometres further north than the Speyerbach.

The borough, with its incorporated parishes, measures 22.5 km (14.0 mi) from west to east and 9.5 km (5.9 mi) from north to south. Its highest point is 619 m above sea level (NN) at the Hohe Loog House at the top of the Hohe Loog mountain and its lowest is 108 m above NN in the village of Geinsheim.

=== Municipal divisions ===
==== Town and town quarters ====
Over time the original town and its surrounding settlements, hamlets and farmsteads have grown together, blurring the original boundaries of the town. Today these have become the town quarters of Branchweilerhof in the southeast, the Hambacher Höhe to the southwest, the Afrikaviertel (so named because its streets are named after researchers into Africa) and the Schöntal to the west. These quarters do not have any particular privileges and are not legally incorporated districts, although some voting precinct borders match part of the boundaries.

The best-known quarter is Winzingen which was first recorded in 774 and thus much older than the Neustadt or "new town" founded in the early 13th century. It was a wine growing village that lay below the Speyerbach, i.e. to the east of the new settlement. In 1892, it was incorporated into the then Neustadt an der Haardt. Since then the town has grown beyond Winzingen to the east.

Inclusive all its incorporated subdistricts, Neustadt covers an area of 11,713.5 hectares. Of that, 5,020.0 ha is woodland, 2,216.0 ha are vineyards, 2,300.0 ha are used for other agricultural purposes, 1,607.0 is built up and 50.0 ha are industrial and retail areas.

==== Subdistricts ====
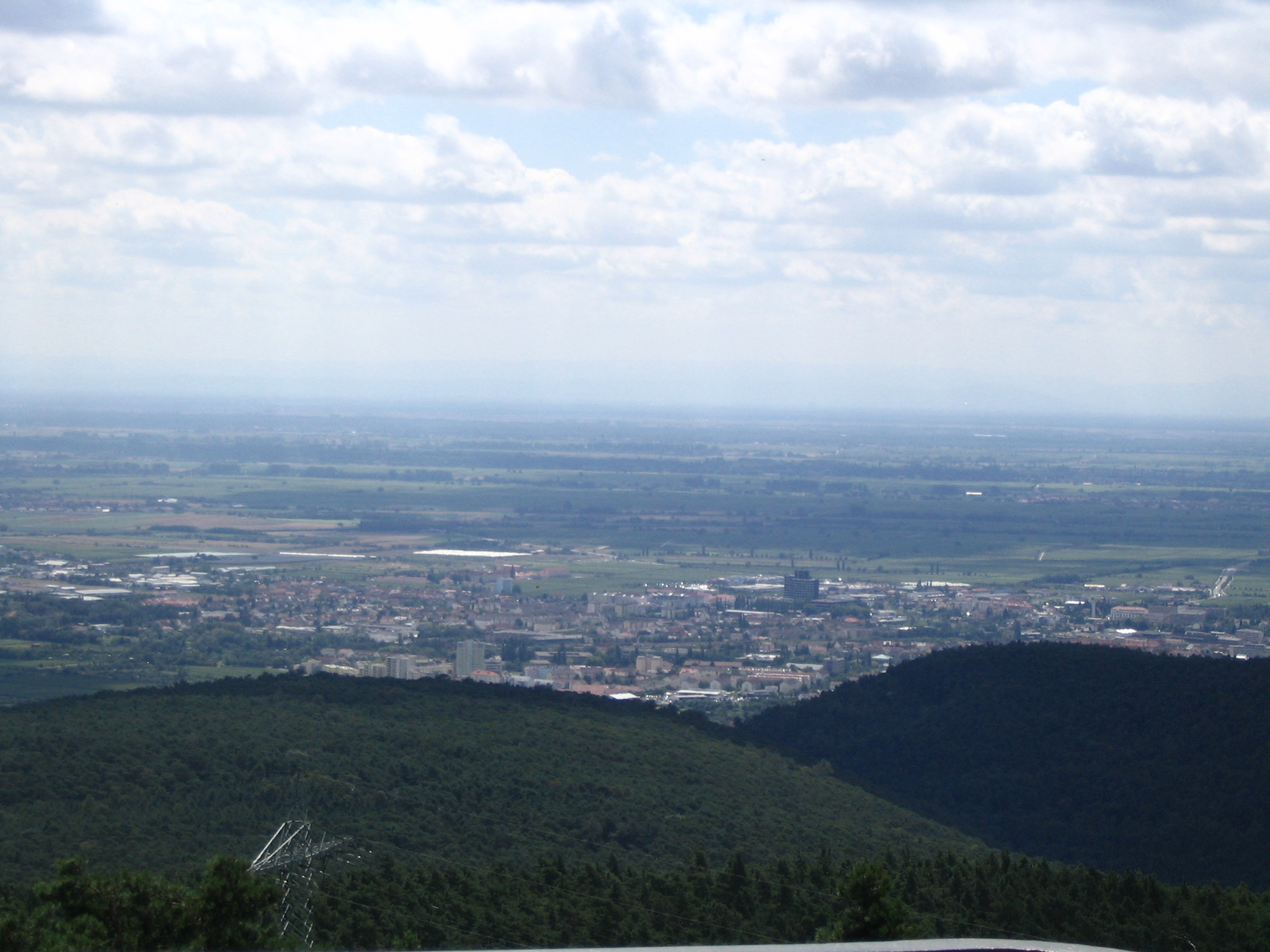
Neustadt seen from Steinberg

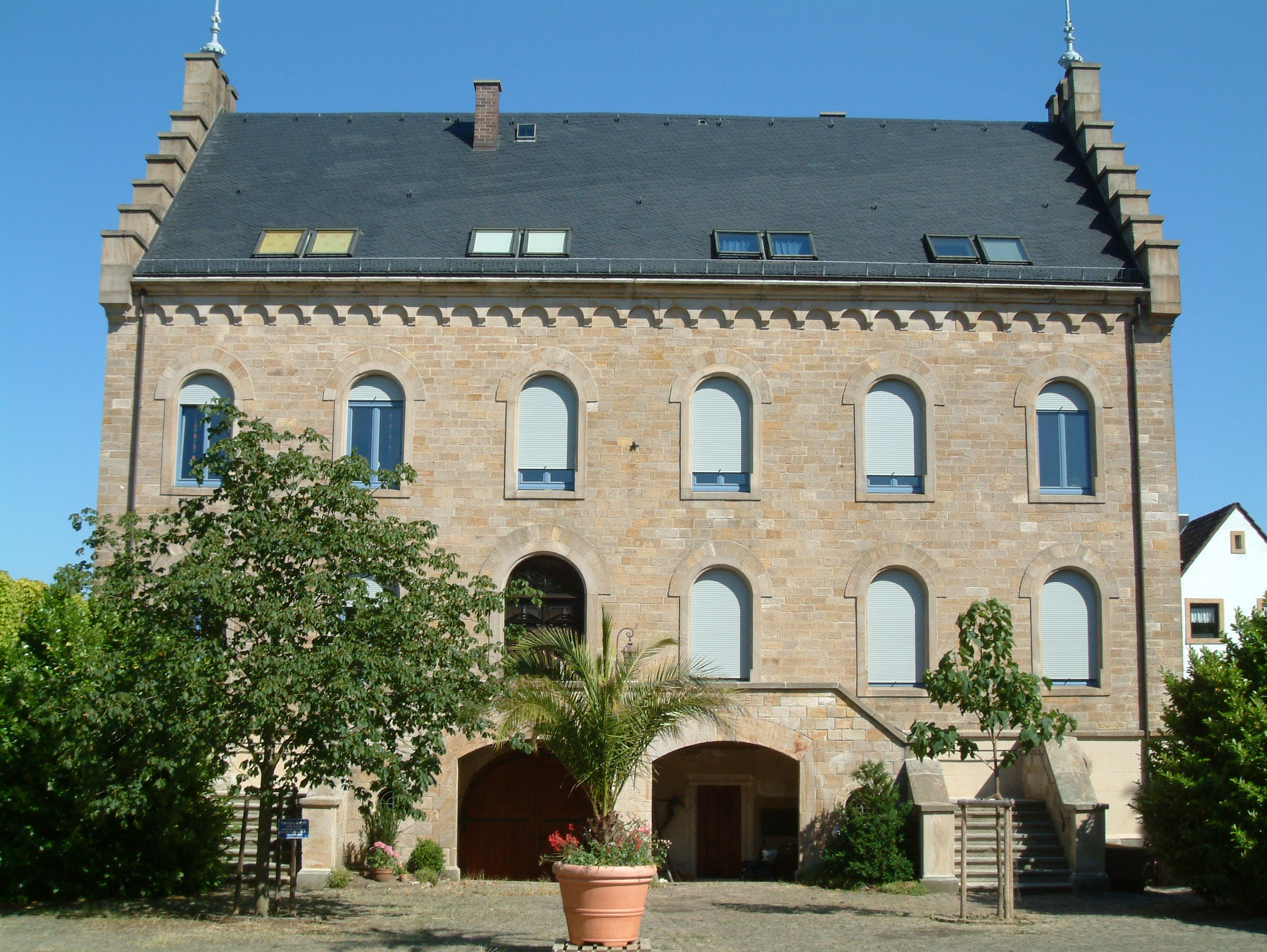
The White House in Mußbach

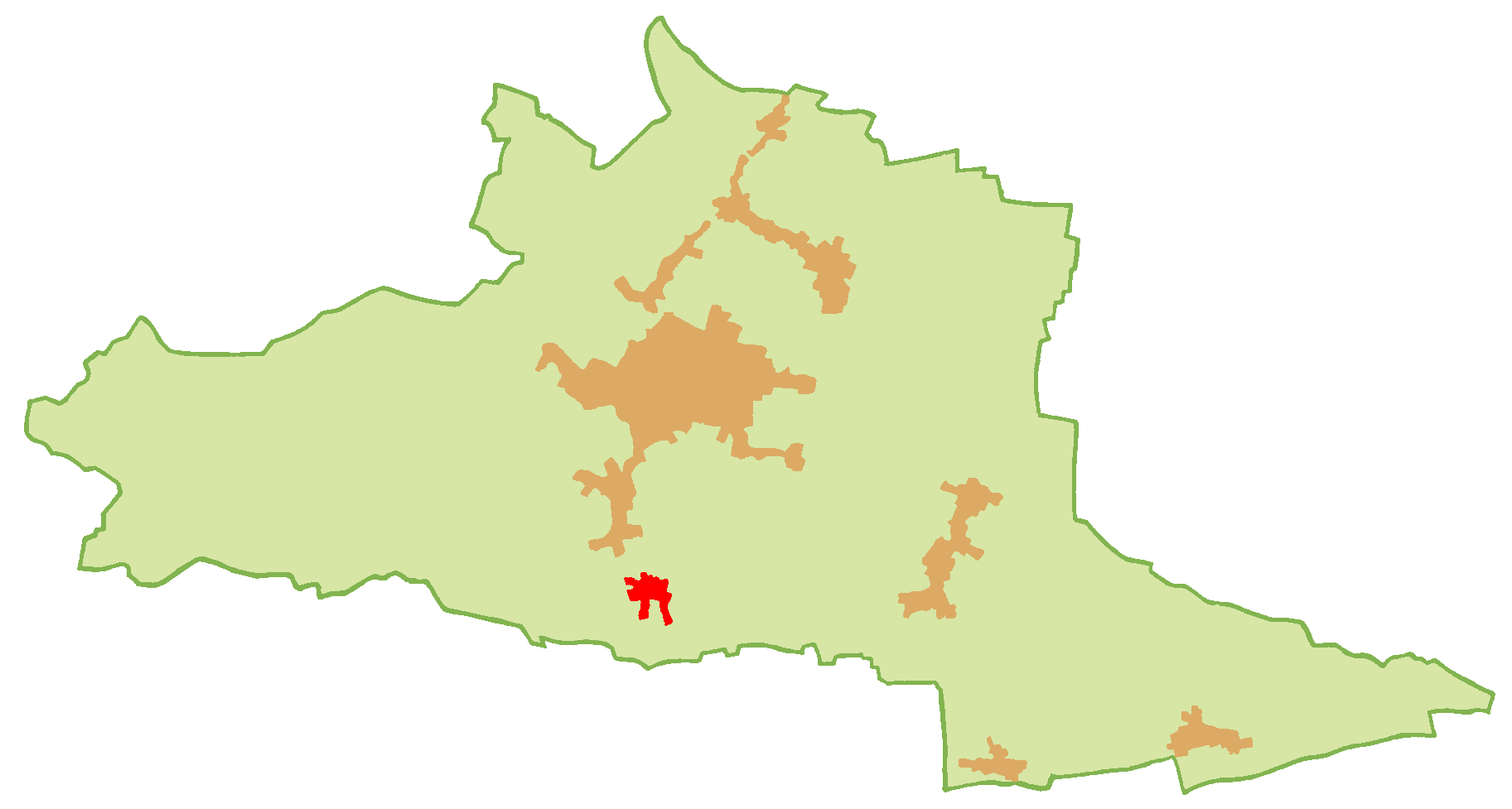
Diedesfeld

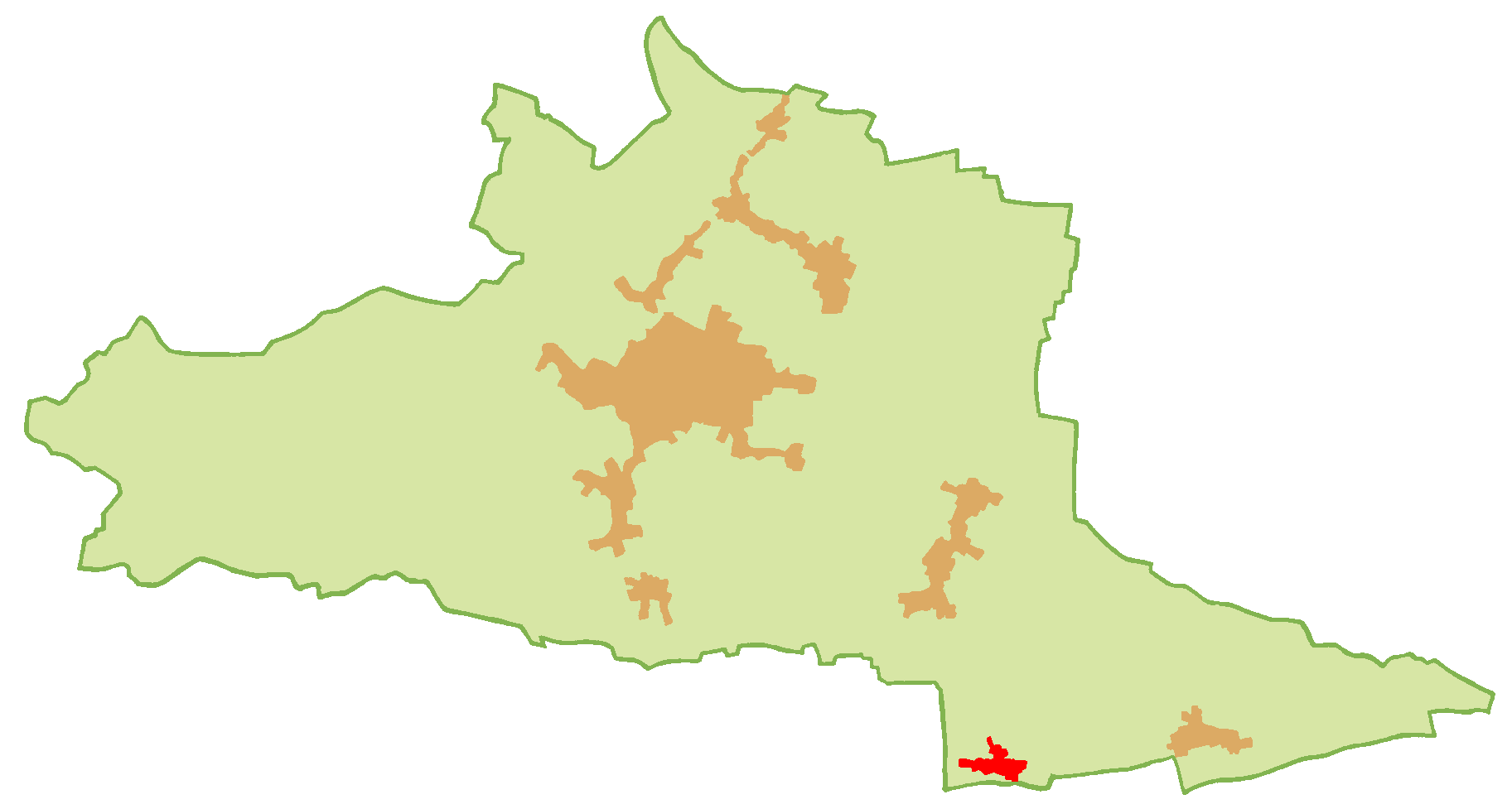
Duttweiler

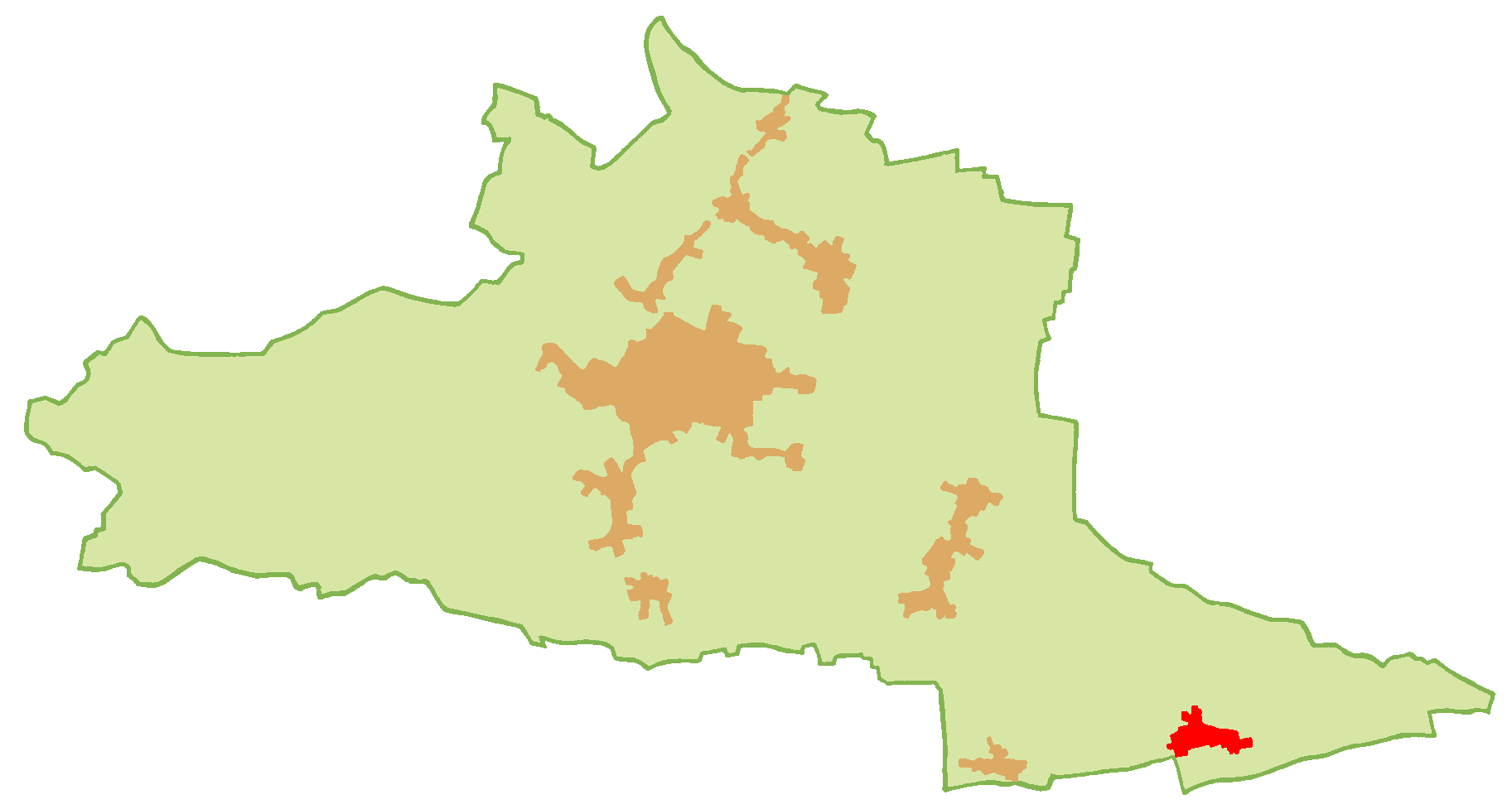
Geinsheim

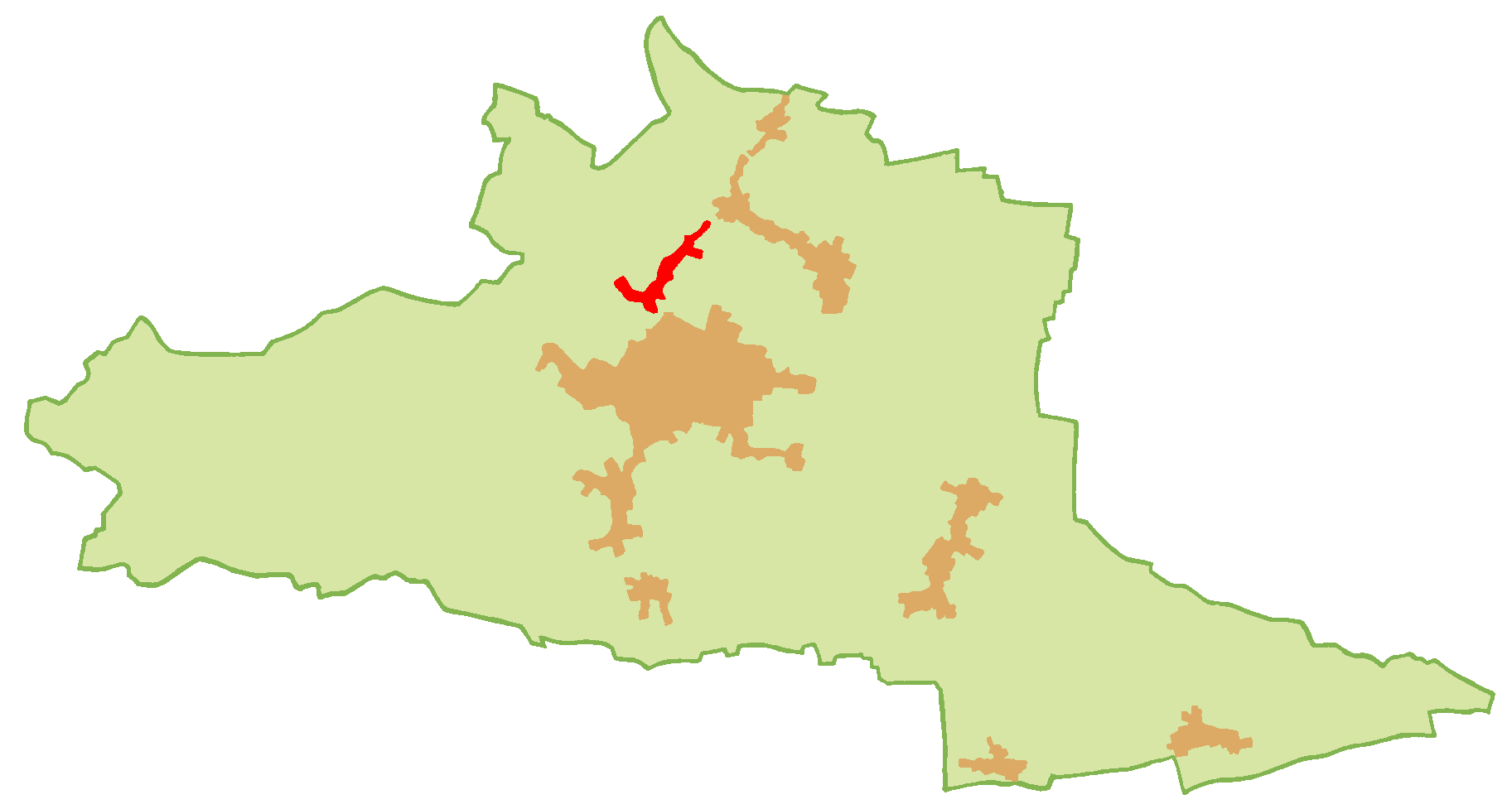
Haardt

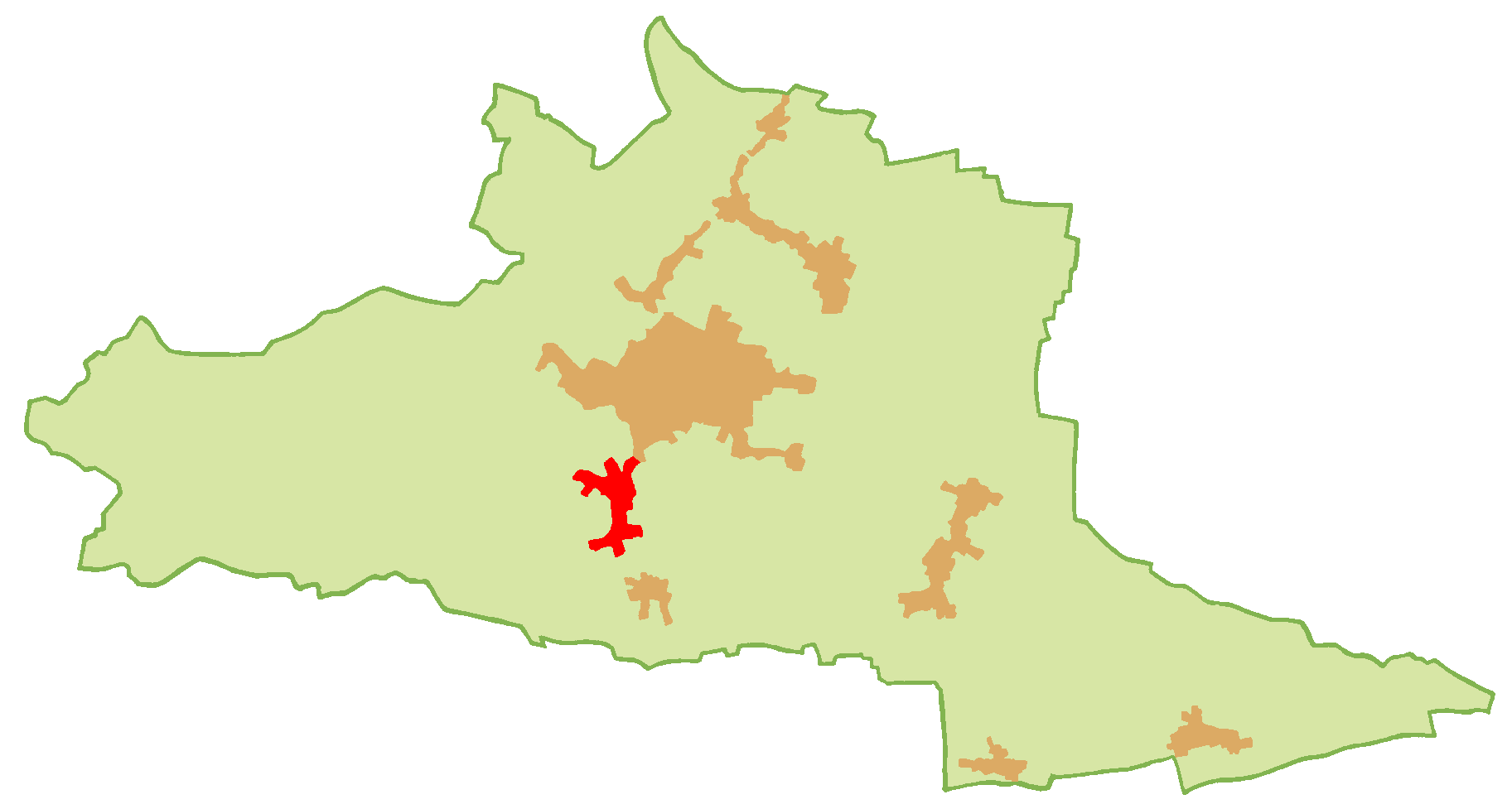
Hambach

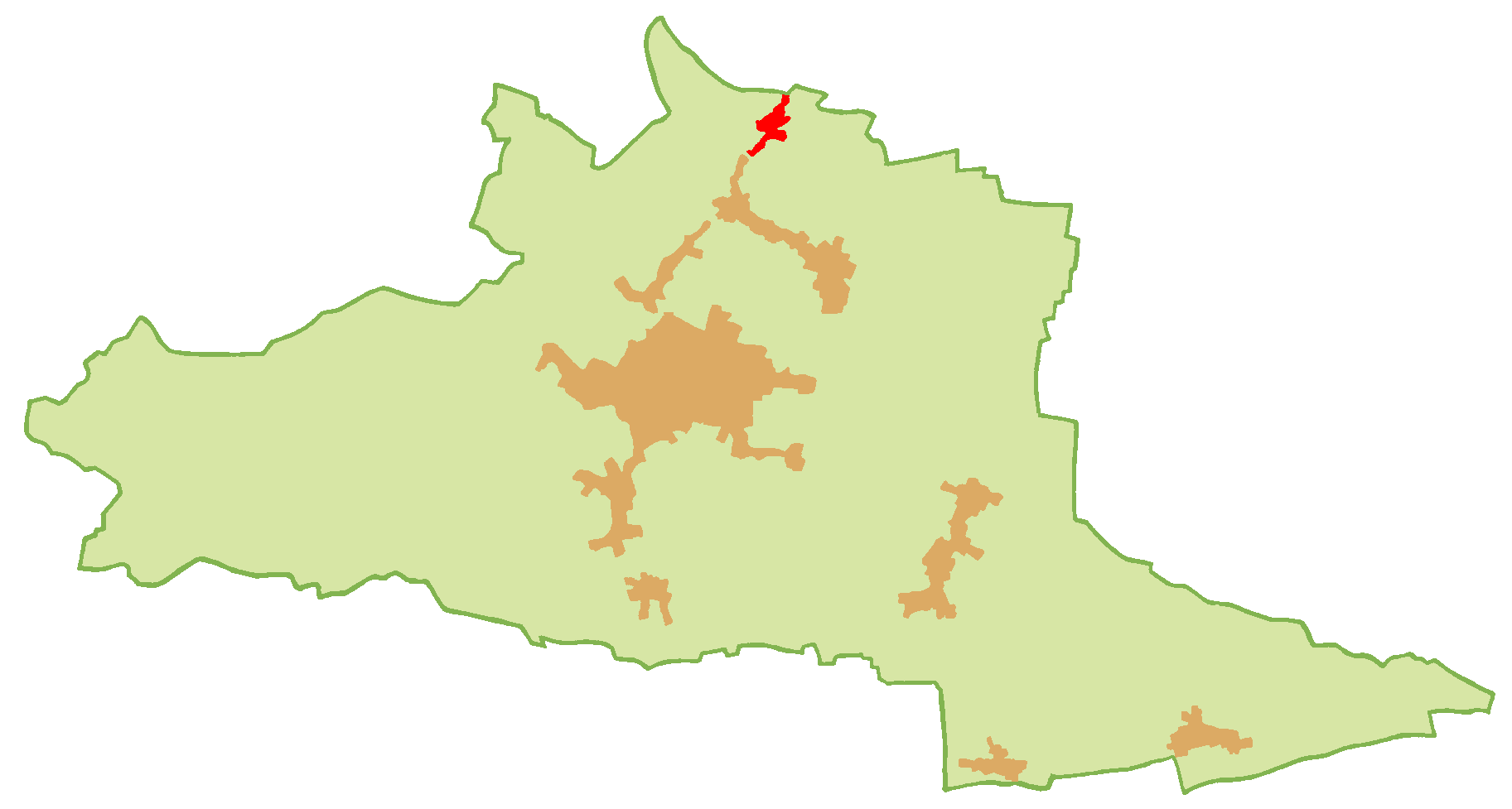
Königsbach

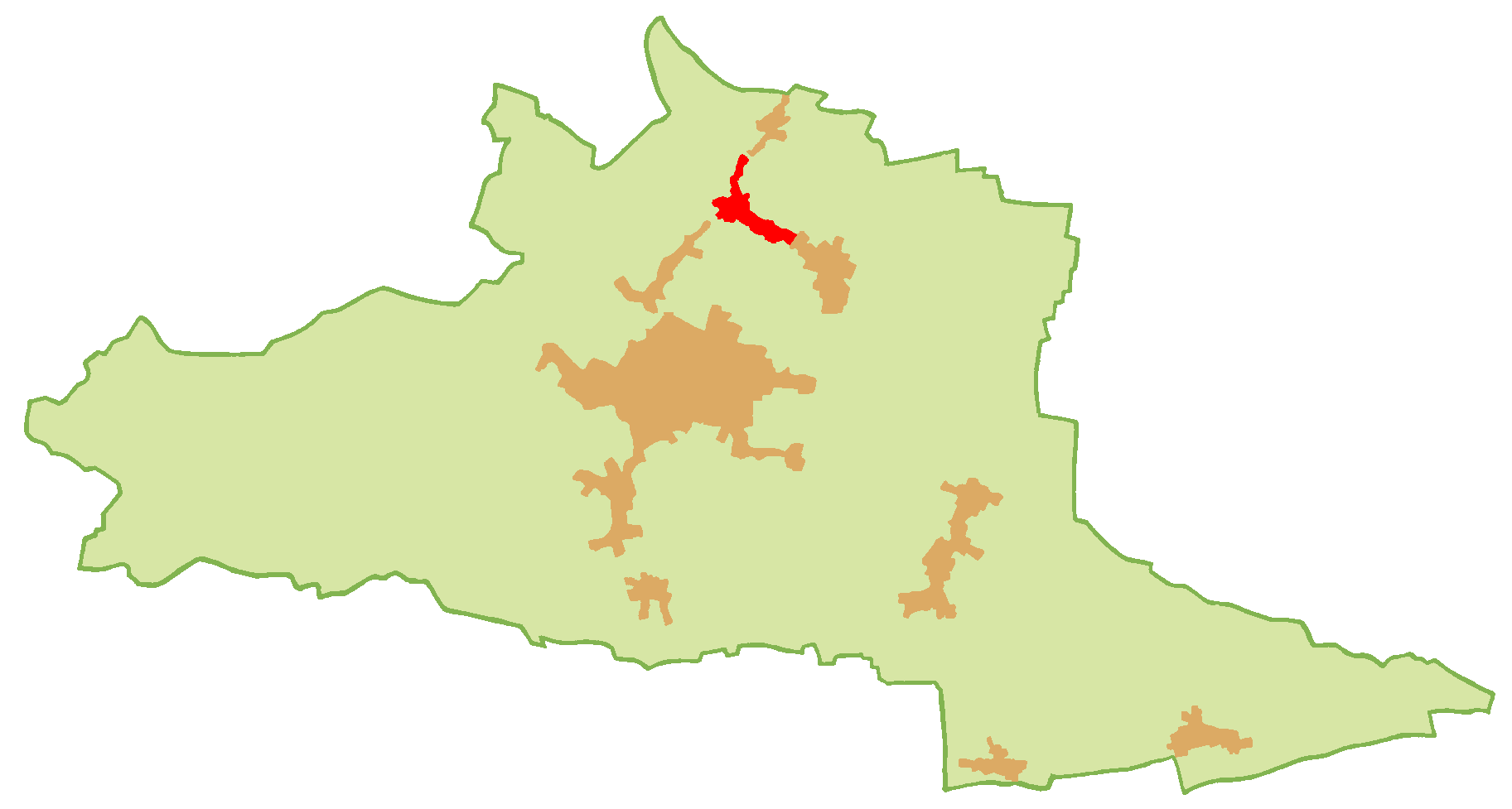
Gimmeldingen

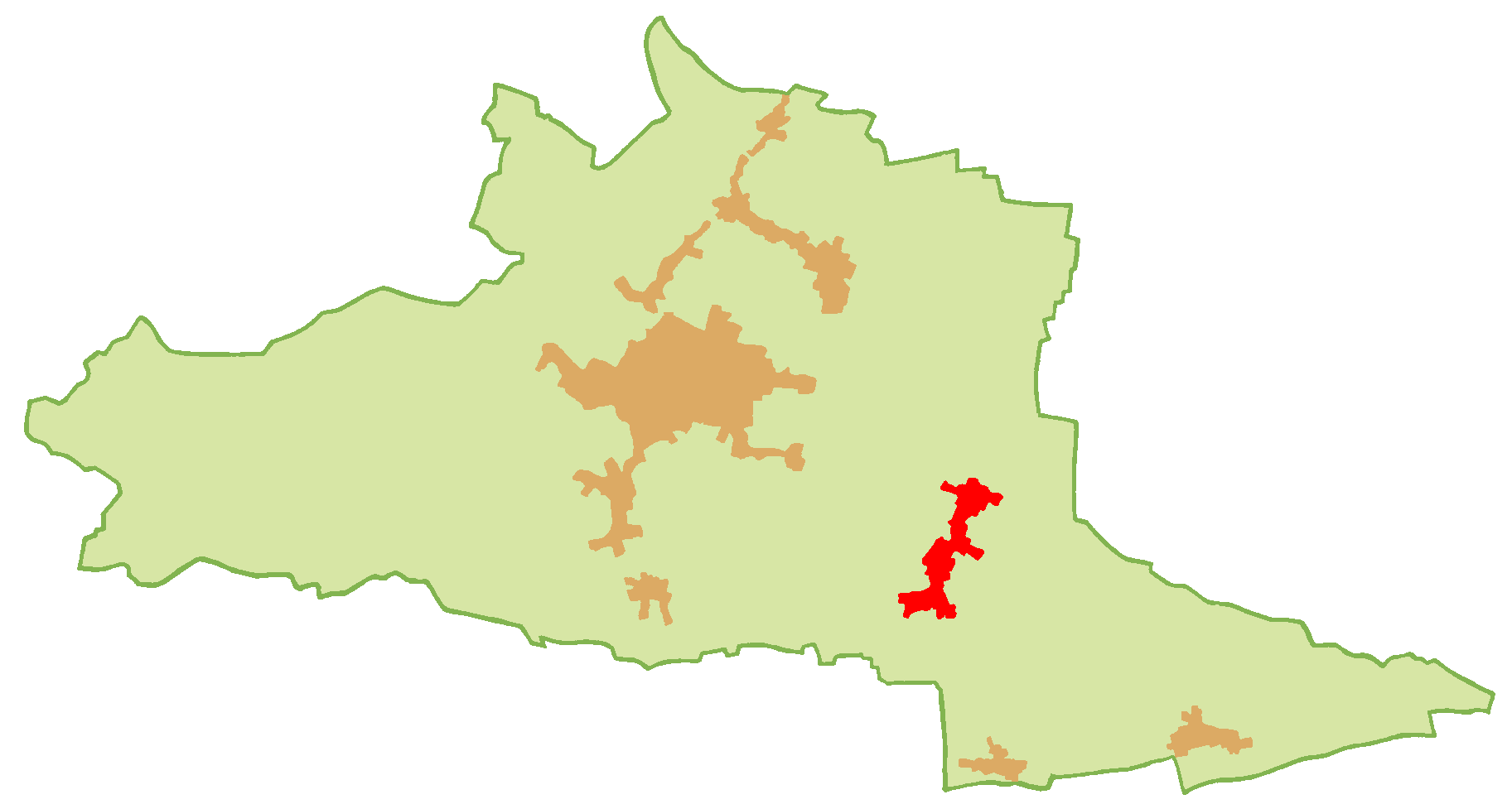
Lachen-Speyerdorf

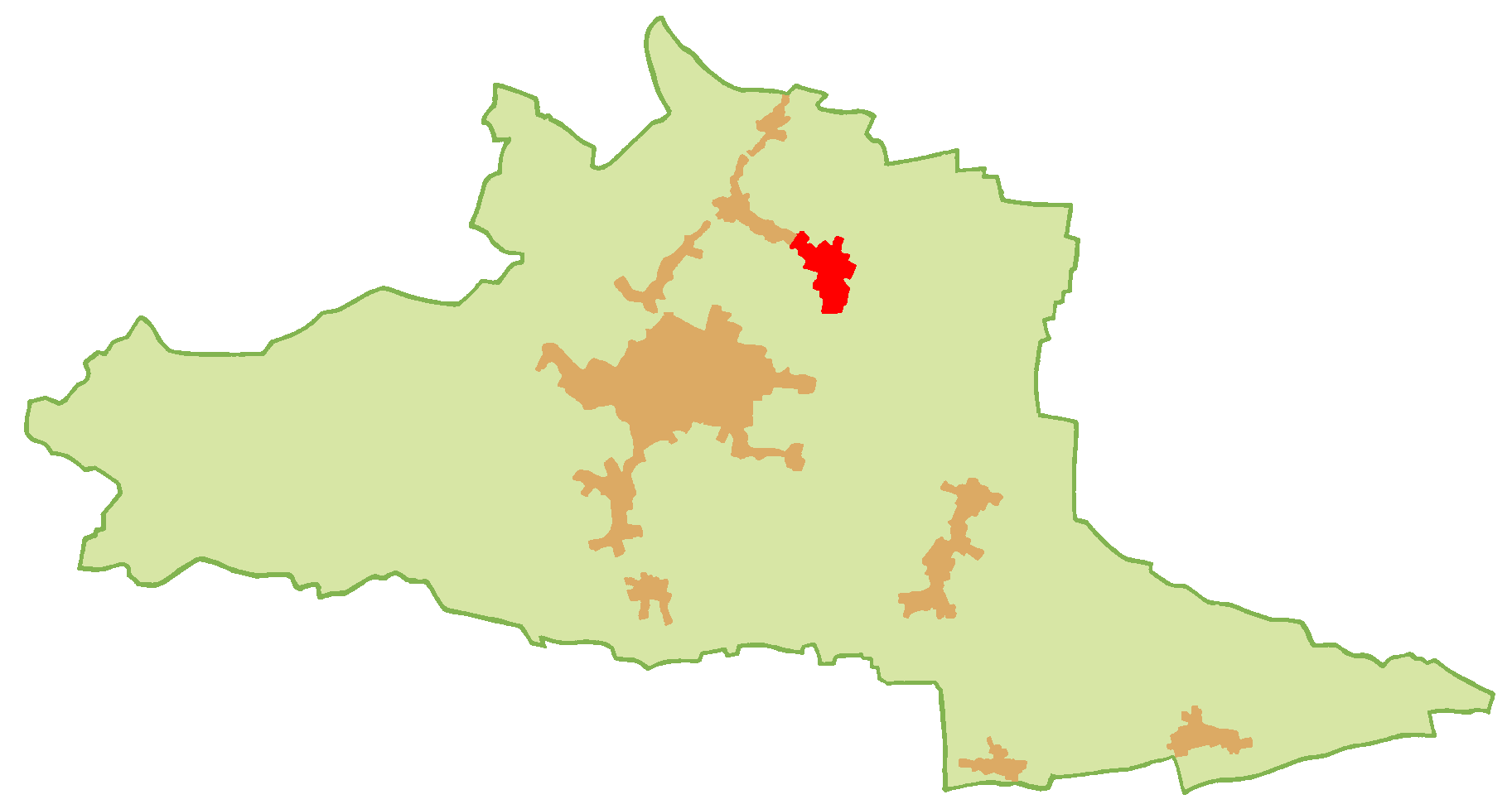
Mußbach

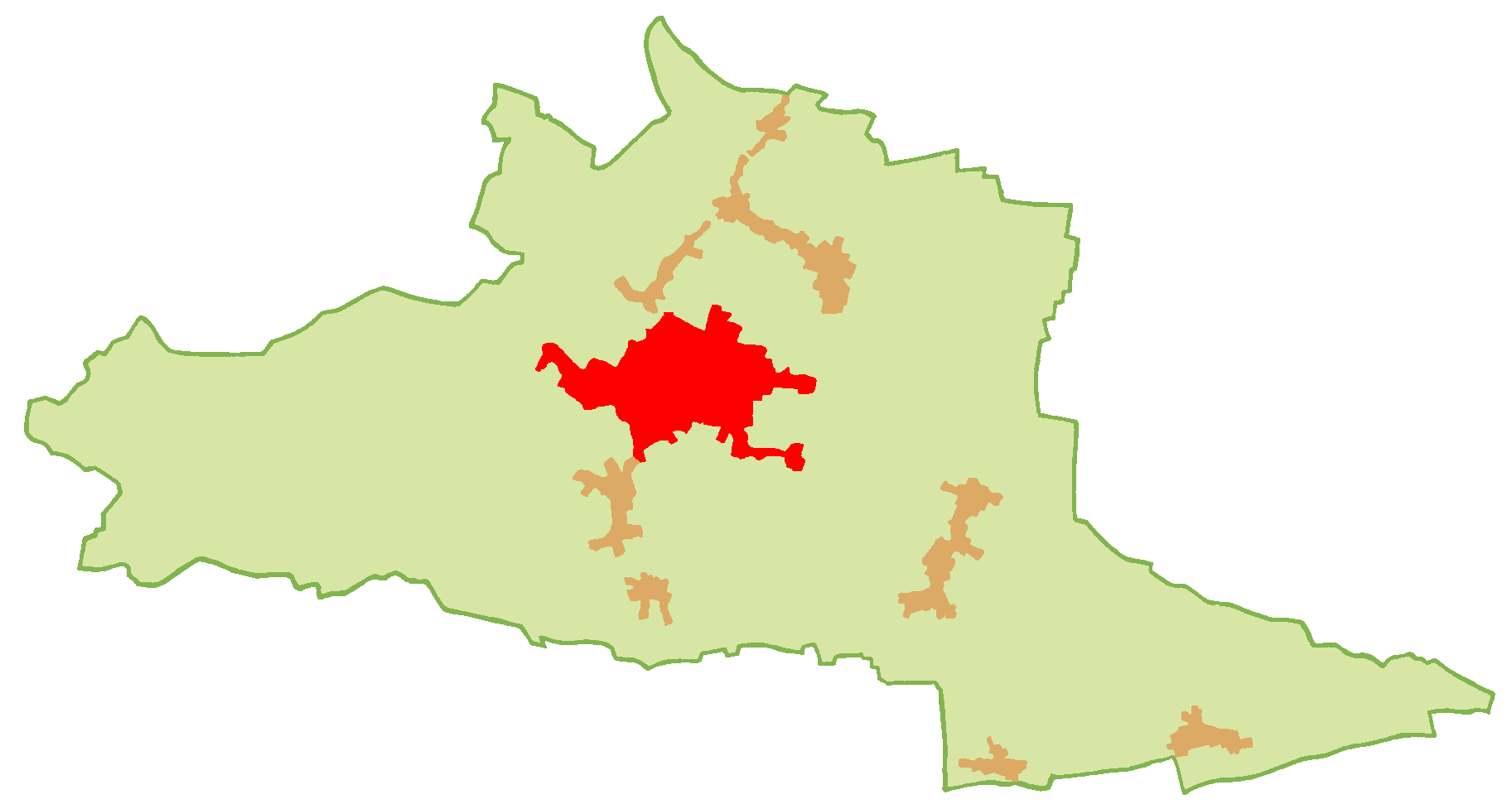
Neustadt (Kernstadt)

In 1969 the villages of Diedesfeld, Geinsheim, Gimmeldingen, Haardt, Hambach, Königsbach, Lachen-Speyerdorf and Mußbach were incorporated into the borough, followed in 1974 by Duttweiler. These villages lie between one and ten kilometres from the main town. They are legally constituted subdistricts, are known as Ortsteil and have a parish chair (Ortsvorsteher) to whom some of the functions of the former mayors have been transferred.

==== Population in 2012 ====
Main town and quarters	26,685
Diedesfeld	2,030
Geinsheim	1,954
Gimmeldingen	2,426
Haardt	2,656
Hambach	5,288
Königsbach	1,144
Lachen-Speyerdorf	5,470
Mußbach	4,184
Duttweiler	1,018
Total	52,855

=== Neighbouring communities ===
Neustadt's neighbouring municipalities running clockwise from the north are the small town of Deidesheim the municipalities of Ruppertsberg, Meckenheim, Haßloch and Maikammer, the small town of Lambrecht and the municipality of Lindenberg.

=== Climate ===
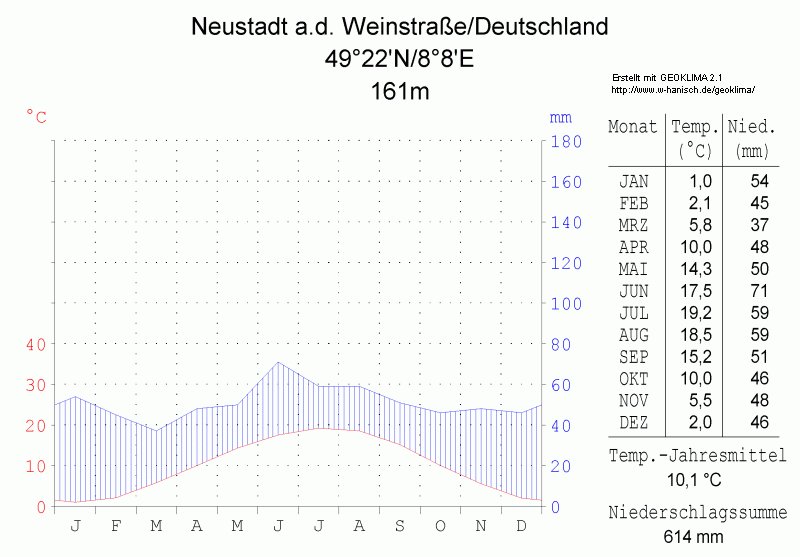
Climatic diagram of Neustadt an der Weinstraße

Neustadt has an equable climate, like that of the whole of Anterior Palatinate: warm summers (around 20 °C (68 °F); lower curve of the climatic diagram) during which most of the precipitation falls, albeit the annual total of 500 mm (20 in) (upper curve) is quite low, and mild, yet drier winters. Annual precipitation figures are in the lower quartile of those recorded in Germany; only 12% of the monitoring stations of the German Weather Service register lower values. The driest month is March; the most rain falls in June, 1.7 times more than in March. However, they vary only slightly and are very evenly distributed throughout the year; only 3% of the weather stations register lower seasonal variations in precipitation.

However, this climate chart is from a weather station at 161 m above NN in the subdistrict of Haardt above the town, which is 25 metres lower. So the values differ, with temperatures being a little lower and rainfall higher. The chart shows an annual average temperatures of 10.1 °C (50.2 °F) to 18.4 °C (65.1 °F) in the summer months dropping 1.7 °C (35.1 °F) during the winter. Its annual precipitation measured 614 mm (24.2 in).

Climate data for Neustadt an der Weinstraße (Pelzerhaken) (1991–2020 normals)
Month	Jan	Feb	Mar	Apr	May	Jun	Jul	Aug	Sep	Oct	Nov	Dec	Year
Mean daily maximum °C (°F)	4.0 (39.2)	4.4 (39.9)	7.8 (46.0)	12.4 (54.3)	16.5 (61.7)	20.2 (68.4)	22.6 (72.7)	22.1 (71.8)	18.6 (65.5)	13.8 (56.8)	8.7 (47.7)	5.3 (41.5)	13.1 (55.6)
Daily mean °C (°F)	0.1 (32.2)	0.8 (33.4)	4.3 (39.7)	8.4 (47.1)	12.7 (54.9)	16.2 (61.2)	17.9 (64.2)	17.7 (63.9)	13.3 (55.9)	9.0 (48.2)	4.2 (39.6)	1.0 (33.8)	8.9 (48.0)
Mean daily minimum °C (°F)	−0.1 (31.8)	−0.4 (31.3)	1.0 (33.8)	3.6 (38.5)	7.3 (45.1)	10.9 (51.6)	13.4 (56.1)	13.4 (56.1)	11.1 (52.0)	8.0 (46.4)	4.2 (39.6)	1.5 (34.7)	6.2 (43.2)
Average relative humidity (%)	88.5	86.1	82.5	80.0	78.7	77.2	77.9	80.5	82.5	86.0	87.9	88.6	83.0
Source: World Meteorological Organisation

== History ==
=== Chronological table ===
Period	Event
774	First recorded mention of the villages of Winzingen, Lachen and Speyerdorf
around 1200	Construction of Wolfsburg Castle by Count Palatine Louis I
early 13th Century	Founding of the new town (Neue Stadt) by Count Palatine Louis I and his son, Otto II below their Winzingen Castle
1254	Member of the Great Rhenish Town Federation (Großer Rheinische Städtebund)
1275	Granting of town rights
until 1797	Part of the Electorate of the Palatinate, seat of the Oberamt of Neustadt an der Haardt
1797–1815	Neustadt in the French (Département du Mont-Tonnerre)
1816–1945	Neustadt part of the Bavarian (Rhenish Palatinate, later Rheinpfalz)
1832	Hambach Festival: Demonstration by 30,000 people at Hambach Castle for democracy and state unity
1847	Opening of the Ludwigshafen am Rhein & Neustadt Railway
1892	Incorporation of the village of Winzingen
1969–1974	Incorporation of nine surrounding parishes

=== Early history ===
The oldest traces of settlement and archaeological finds indicate that Celts used to live in the area of the present town. They have left behind ringworks, clay pots, coins and weapons that date to the time around 150 B.C. The Romans probably took possession of the land around 20 A.D. Around 400 it was taken by the Alemanni who were superseded in turn around 500 A.D. by the Germanic Franks.

There are no precise details for the centuries after the end of Roman rule, but it is known that villages already existed before the actual town of Neustadt was founded: Winzingen, today a town quarter, was already mentioned in 774. The subdistricts of Mußbach, Lachen-Speyerdorf, Geinsheim, Duttweiler and Hambach are also considerably older than the main town. In general it is fair to say that the history of Neustadt is closely linked to that of the Palatinate region.

=== Middle Ages ===
Just a few decades after its foundation in the early 13th century, Neustadt was granted town rights on 6 April 1275 based on those given to Speyer.

==== Town quarters ====
In the Late Middle Ages Neustadt was divided into four town quarters, whose names indicate the status and occupations of their inhabitants or give important local information:

In the Lauerviertel (from Loheviertel = "Tanbark Quarter") next to the Speyerbach worked the tanners. The Kesselringviertel was named after an influential family of the 14th century. In the Frauenviertel ("Women's Quarter") were ecclesiastical possessions under the patronage of Saint Mary's. The Jewish community lived in the Judenviertel ("Jewish Quarter").

Towards the end of the 15th century, other quarters were established outside the town fortifications: the Stadtgasserviertel, the Kirschgartenviertel and the Ägyptenvorstadt.

=== Reformation ===
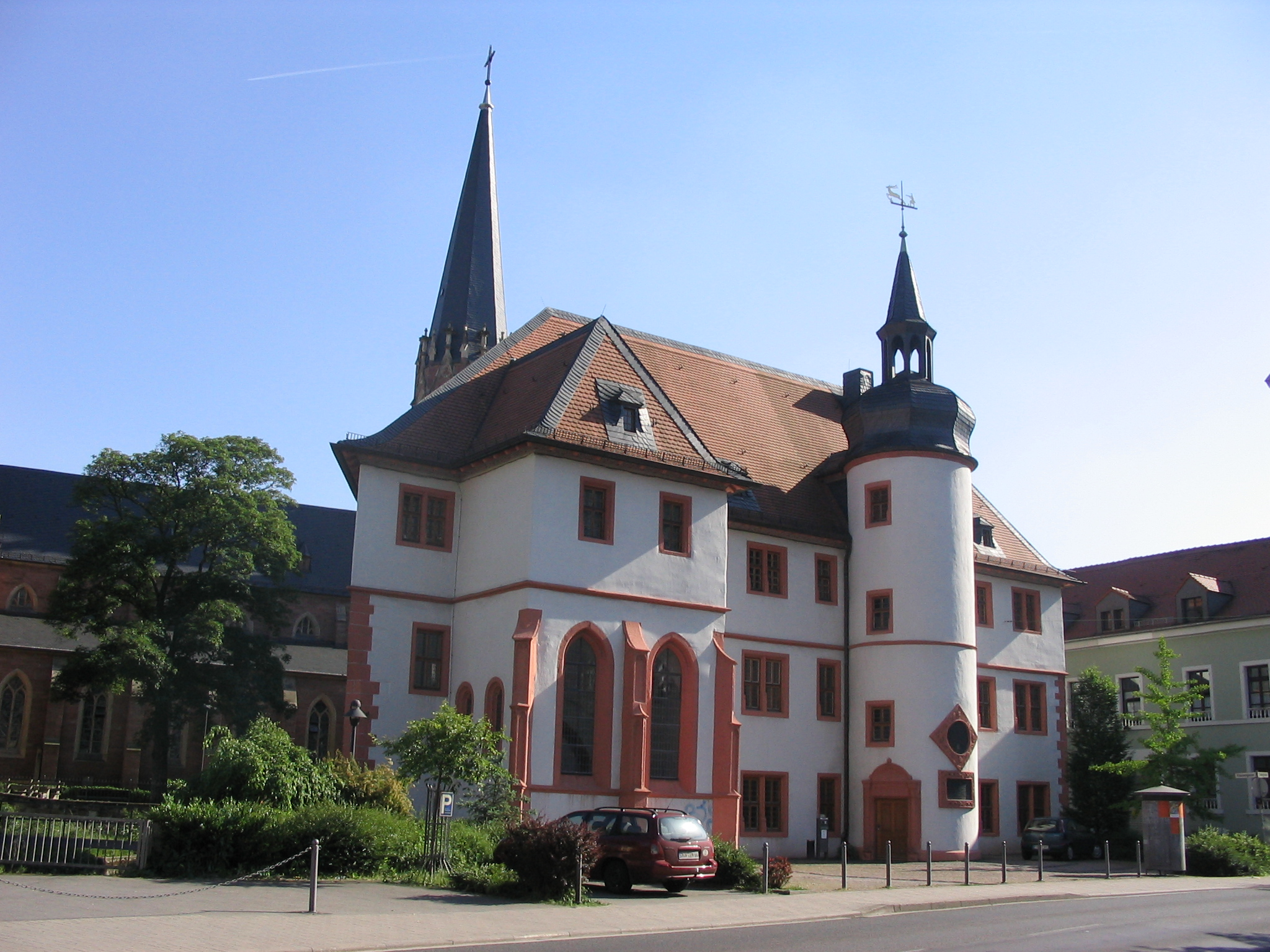
The Casimirianum

In the Peasants' Uprising, rebellious peasant bands entered the town unopposed on 6 May 1525. During the Reformation, Louis the Pacific ruled the Palatinate until 1544 and strove for reconciliation. His 1538 religion edict allowed Lutherans to preach and take communion. Equally even-handed was his brother and successor, Frederick the Wise. Not until his successor were there strict Protestant rulers. When Frederick III died in 1576, he left a clause in his will that his Lutheran son, Louis VI should not inherit the Ämter of Kaiserslautern and Neustadt, but that they should go instead to his Calvinist brother, John Casimir.

In 1578, Count Palatine John Casimir founded the Neustadt College that was named after him, the Casimirianum, because his Lutheran brother, Louis V, had cleared the university in Heidelberg of Calvinists; John Casimir was active as an advocate of the reformed faith and offered the exiled professors and students asylum. When he moved to Heidelberg in 1583 in order to take over the regency for his still under-age son there after the death of the brother's reign, Neustadt's short time as a university seat ended.

=== 17th century ===
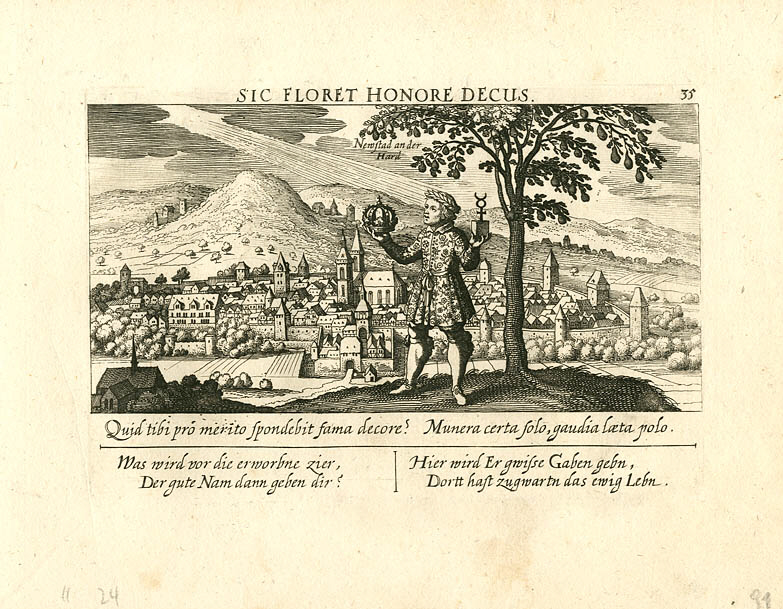
Neustad an der Hard, a copperplate from Daniel Meisner's Schatzkästlein, 1624

Denominational disputes over the following century were no longer pursued purely by argument, but with weapons, and the Palatinate was invaded by one campaign after another. Neustadt was conquered six times during the Thirty Years' War; in 1622 by the Spaniards, in 1631 by Sweden, in 1635 by Imperial troops, in 1638 by troops of Duke Bernard of Saxe-Weimar, in 1639 by the French under Field Marshal Henri II d'Orléans, Duke of Longueville and 1644 again by the French. After each occasion, the occupying forces attempted to enforce their confession.

Unlike other Palatine towns, Neustadt survived the War of the Palatine Succession (1689–1697) almost unscathed.

=== 18th and 19th centuries ===
In 1744 of the town population of 2,496; 1,676 were reformed, 620 were Roman Catholics and 200 were Lutherans. Jews were not included in these statistics.

In the 18th century, the town lost its medieval appearance, because its militarily obsolete and superfluous town walls were demolished. When, in 1722, the state road to Mannheim, the new residence of the Elector had been built (today the B 38), in 1723 the northern town wall was pierced.

Following the seizure of the Left Bank of the Rhine during the French Revolution in 1797–98, Neustadt became just an insignificant administrative centre, the canton capital of the département of Donnersberg. Napoleon passed through the town on his retreat from Erfurt to Paris and its official celebrated his visit. When, five years later, parts of the emperor's army, defeated near Leipzig, marched through the town the sentiment was, however, quite the opposite.

In 1815, Neustadt became part of the Kingdom of Bavaria until 1945, along with the rest of the Palatinate which was one of 8 Bavarian districts (Rhine District). As of 1837, the district was renamed as Pfalz. As a result of this resubordination, in 1818 the town became the seat of a Landkommissariat (called a Bezirksamt from 1862 and a Landkreis from 1939). In 1832, the Hambach Festival took place near the town. In 1847, Neustadt was connected to the railway network by the Palatine Ludwig Railway.

=== 20th century ===
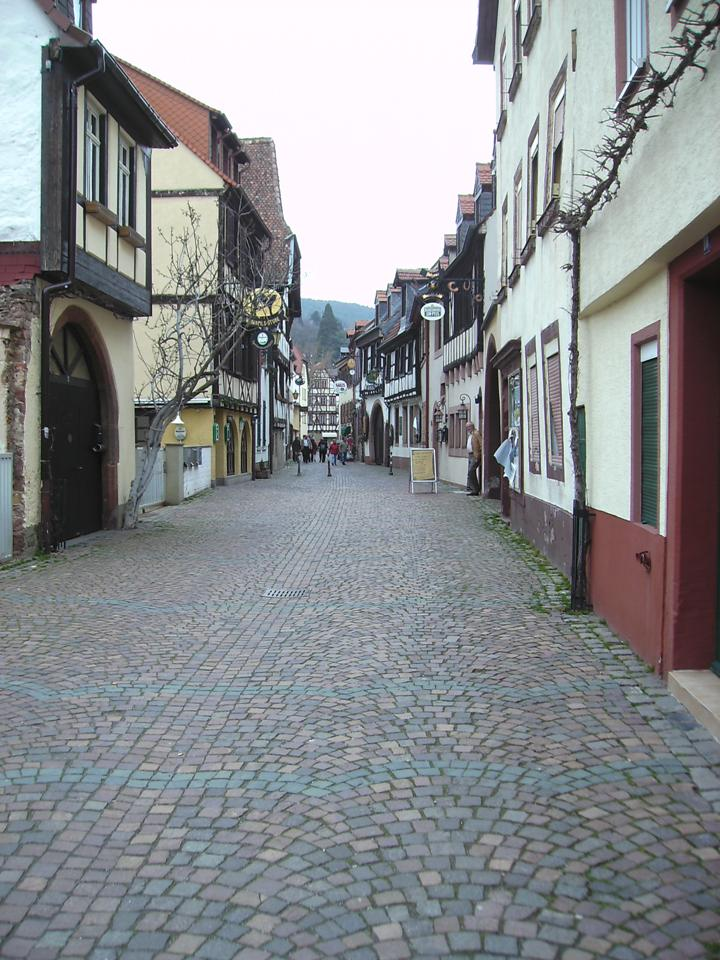
Hintergasse in the Old Town

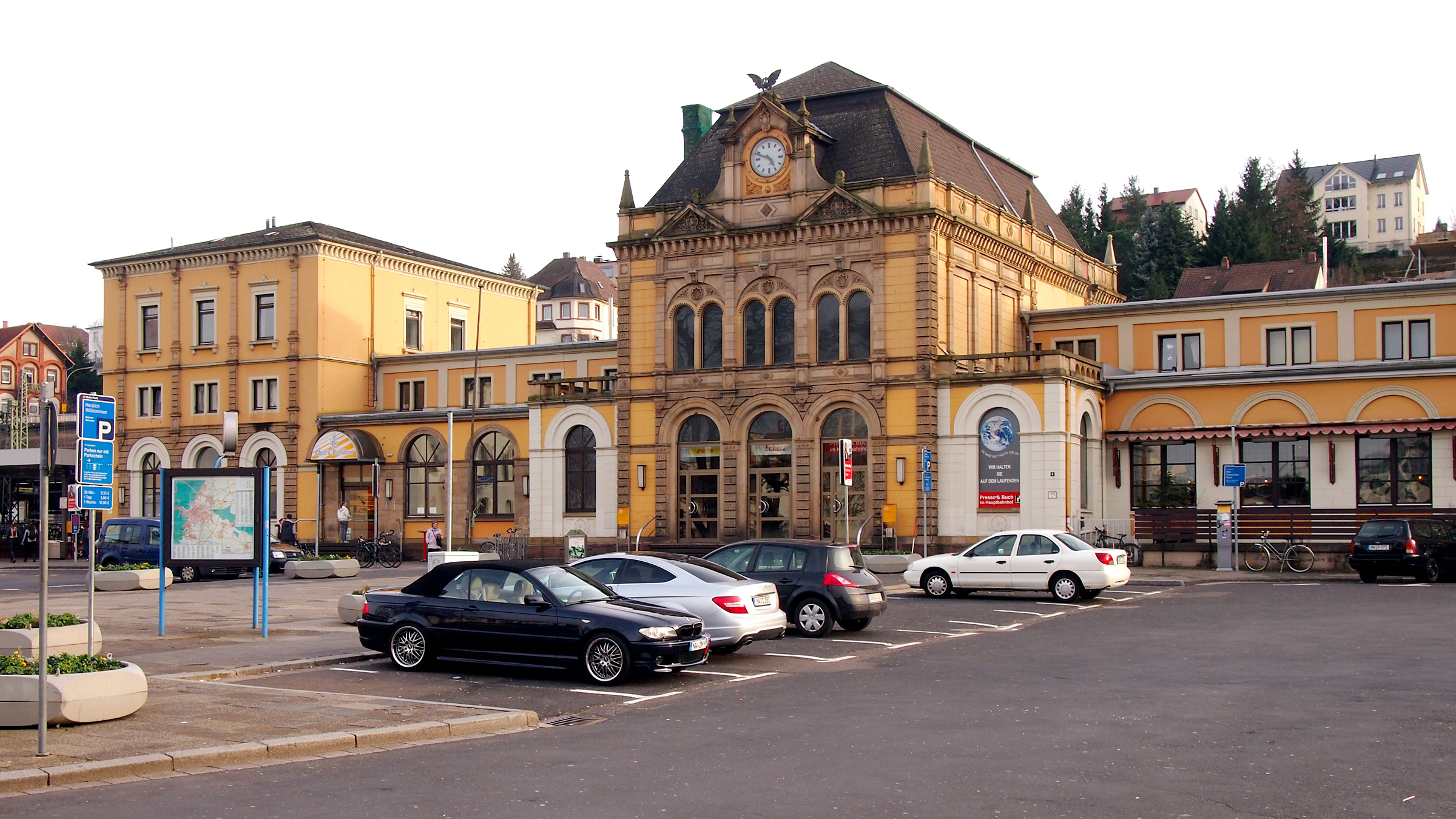
Central station

A Workers and Soldiers Council was established during the German Revolution of 1918. Three delegates were sent to see Kurt Eisner, the premier of newly founded People's State of Bavaria. These delegates consisted of a member of the Majority Social Democratic Party of Germany, a member of the emergent German People's Party and a third linked to the interests of the local wine trade. However, Eisner failed to take notice of their concerns and despite his subsequent assertion that the Pfalz was an integral part of Bavaria, this indifference helped fuel separatist sentiment in the area.

According to the Armistice Agreement the Pfalz region fell within the French zone during the occupation of the Rhineland. The Siamese Expeditionary Forces occupied Neustadt following the end of World War I.

In 1920, Neustadt, like six others in the Palatinate, separated from its Bezirksamt and became an independent town.

Neustadt's role during the Nazi era began in 1927 when it became the seat of the Gauleiter for the Nazi Party. It retained this function de facto until 1945, although in 1939 Kaiserslautern was nominated as the Gauhauptstadt ("Capital of the Gau") and the state authorities, who were formed in 1940 from the Palatine and Saarland administrations in Speyer and Saarbrücken and were led by the Gauleiter in personal union, were also not based in Neustadt. The town was given the function of a normal Palatine seat of administration on 8 September 1945, In 1946, it became the seat of the Rhineland-Palatinate province (Regierungsbezirk) of the Palatinate.

On 7 June 1969, the hitherto independent municipalities of Geinsheim, Gimmeldingen, Haardt an der Weinstraße, Hambach an der Weinstraße, Königsbach an der Weinstraße, Lachen-Speyerdorf, Mussbach an der Weinstraße and Diedesfeld were incorporated into the town's borough. On 16 March 1974 they were followed by Duttweiler.

=== Etymology ===
Officially abbreviated as Neustadt a. d. Weinstr., the name can be shortened as Neustadt/Weinstrasse (as on train departure and arrival boards) or Neustadt (Weinstrasse). The name literally means "new town on the wine route", as it lies on the German wine route (Deutsche Weinstrasse), in Rhineland-Palatinate, in Germany.

It is one of several dozen German and Austrian places called Neustadt. These new towns are typically differentiated by the rivers upon which they lie (e.g., Neustadt (Aisch)), the regions they are located in (e.g., Neustadt/Hessen) or, in this case, a peculiar distinctive feature – namely Weinstraße – "Wine Route."

== Culture, nature and sights ==
=== Culture ===
The following venues are available for cultural events: the Saalbau as a theatre and concert hall, the restored Herrenhof Mußbach as a cultural centre, the open air stage in the grounds of Villa Böhm, the Kleinkunstbühne, die reblaus in the Catacombe Theatre, the Theater in der Kurve in Hambach and the historic Steinhäuser Hof as the home venue of Jazzclub NW.

=== Nature ===
Neustadt's borough extends from the Rhine Plain into the Palatine Forest Nature Park, the largest contiguous forest region in Germany and part of the Palatine Forest-North Vosges Biosphere Reserve. There is a total of twelve nature reserves in the borough: Naturschutzgebiet am Wolfsberg, Lochbusch-Königswiesen, Mußbacher Baggerweiher, Haardtrand–Am Häuselberg, Haardtrand–Berggewanne, Haardtrand–Am Wetterkreuz, Haardtrand–Im Erb, Haardtrand–Am Klausental, Haardtrand–Schloßberg, Haardtrand–Am Heidelberg, Haardtrand–Am Sonnenweg und Rehbachwiesen-Langwiesen.

=== Structures ===
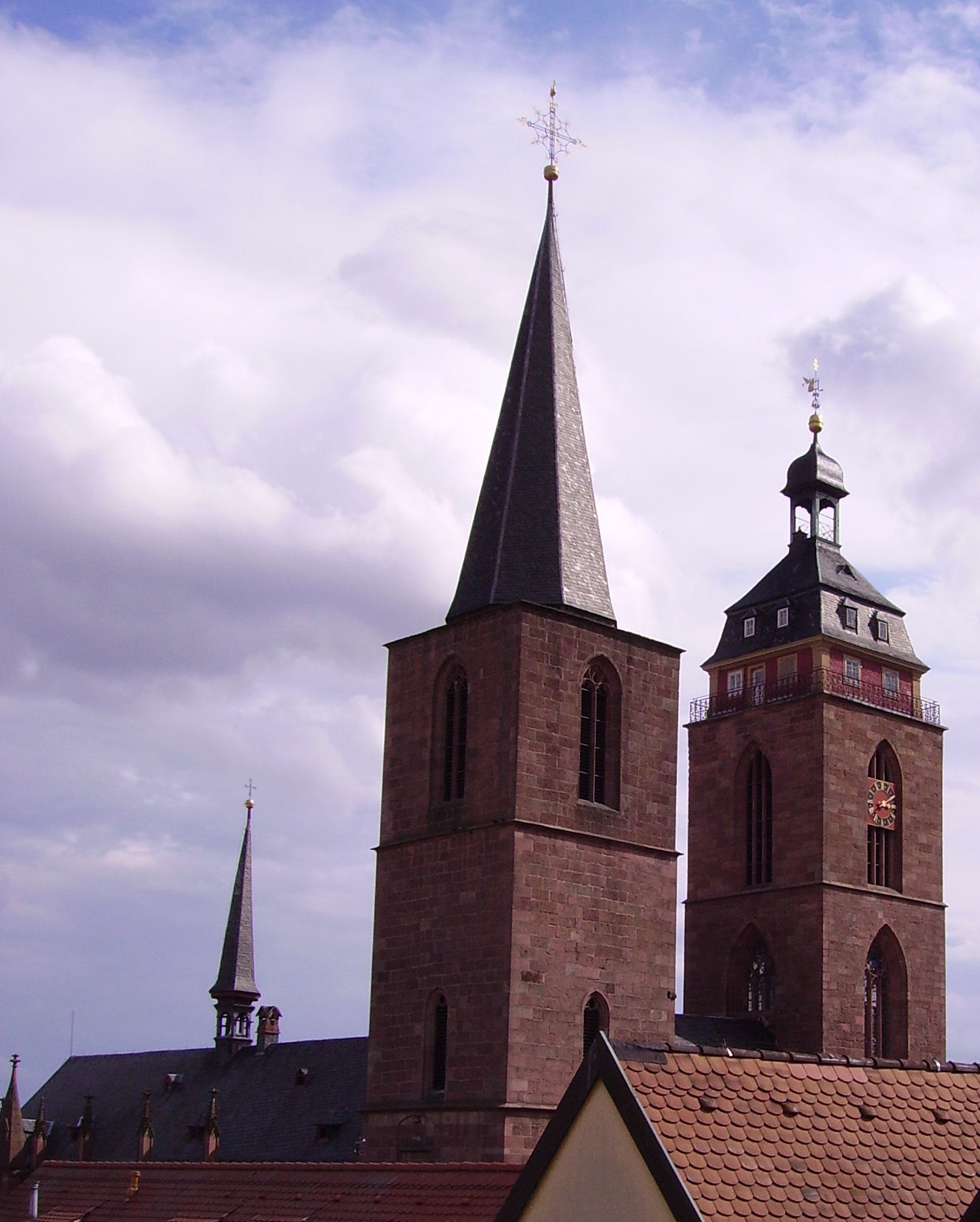
The towers of the abbey church

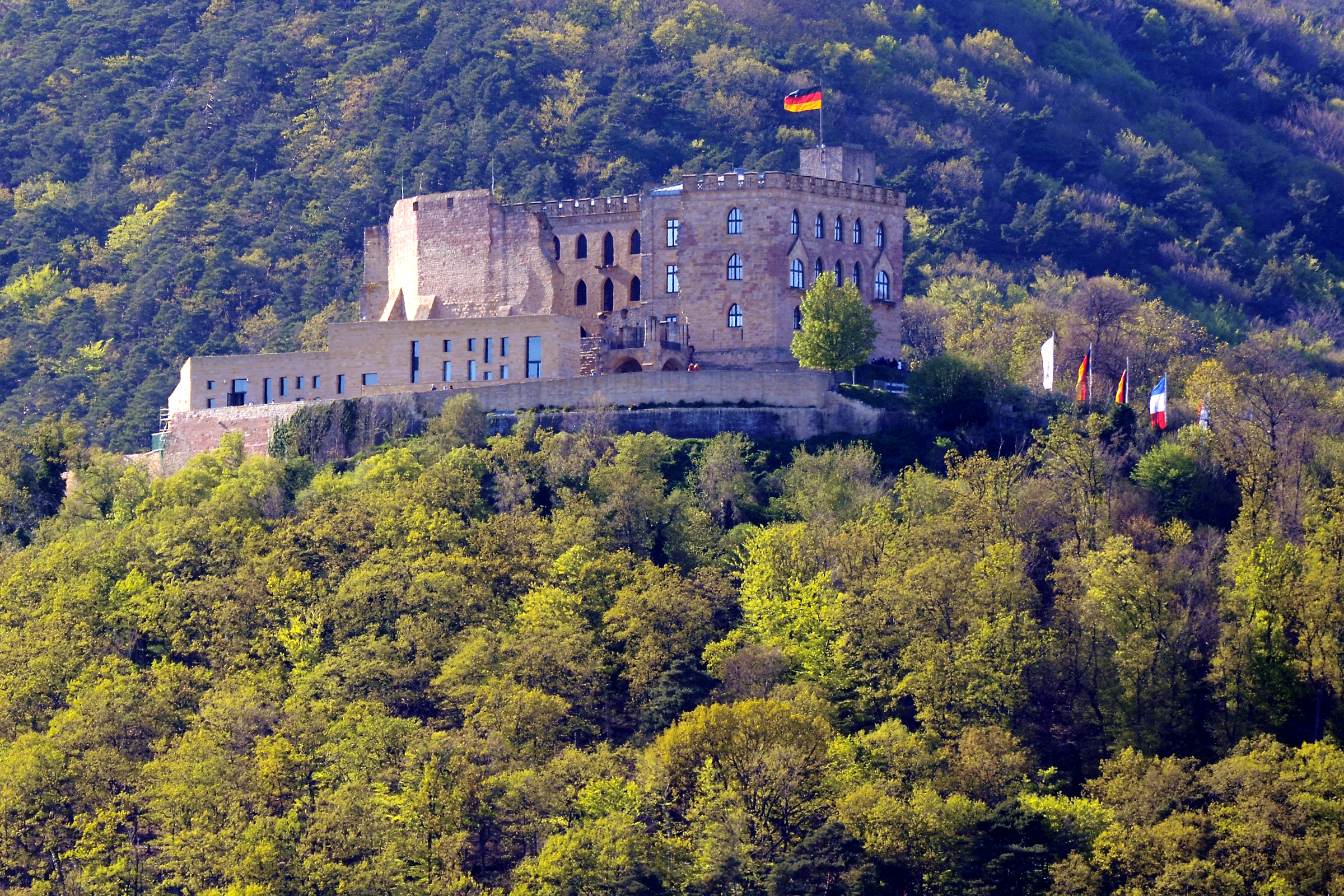
Hambach Castle

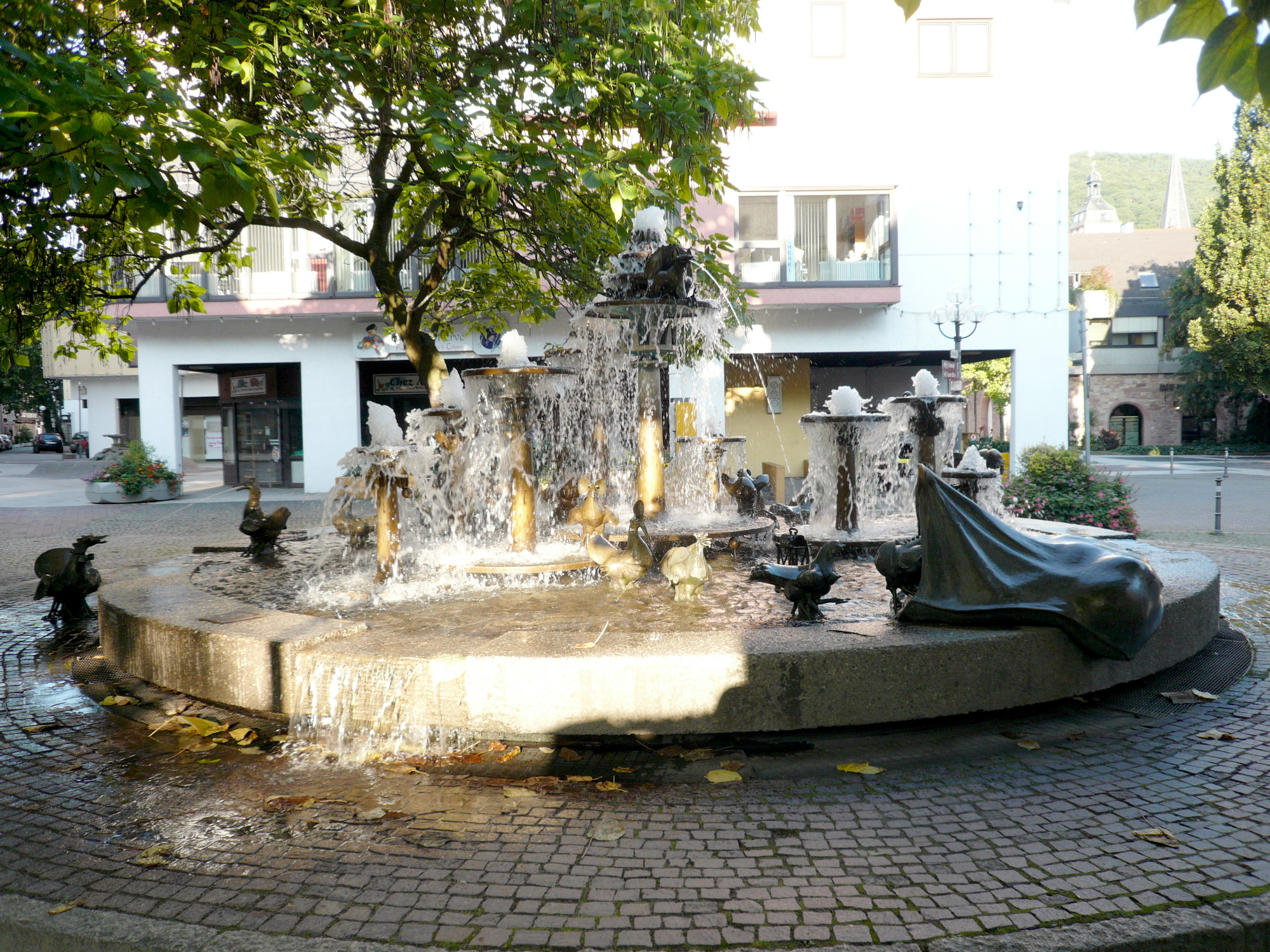
The Elwetritsche Fountain

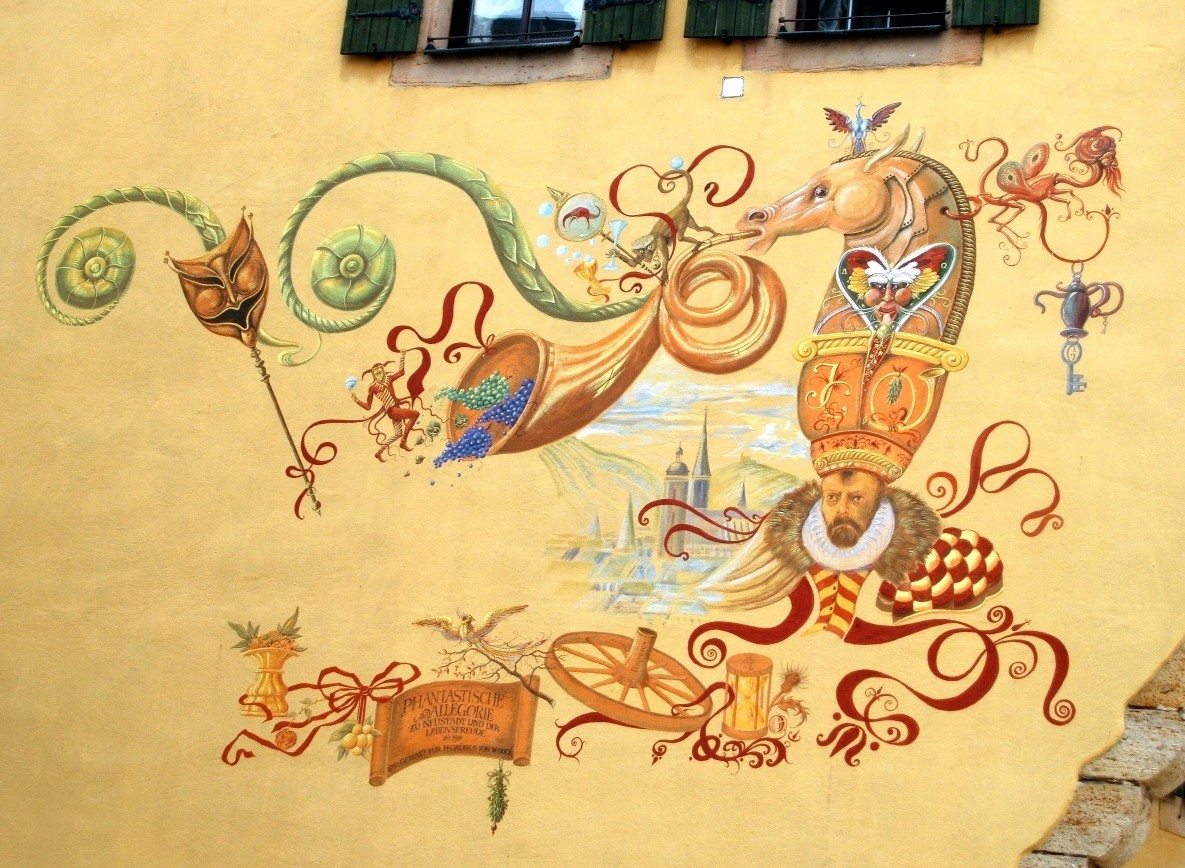
Mural by Werner Holz: "Phantastische Allegorie zu Neustadt a. d. Weinstrasse"

Neustadt's main attraction is its historic Altstadt or Old Town. Notable buildings include its 14th century collegiate church, the former university of Casimirianum and the Steinhäuser Hof. More recently the Elwetritsche Fountain by Gernot Rumpf and the murals by Werner Holz have been added.

Outside the residential areas there are palaces and castles: Hambach Castle, the Wolfsburg, Winzingen Castle, Haardt Castle and the rather more distant Spangenberg Castle above the Elmstein Valley. In the quarter of Hambacher Höhe, by the edge of the Haardt, lies the Abbey of the Sacred Heart.

The outlying villages also have their sights; for example Mußbach with its Old Church of St. John, the manor house, White House and Carl Theodor Hof; or Gimmeldingen with St. Nicholas' Church, the Mithras Shrine, the Old Castle and King Ludwig's Pavilion.

=== Monuments ===
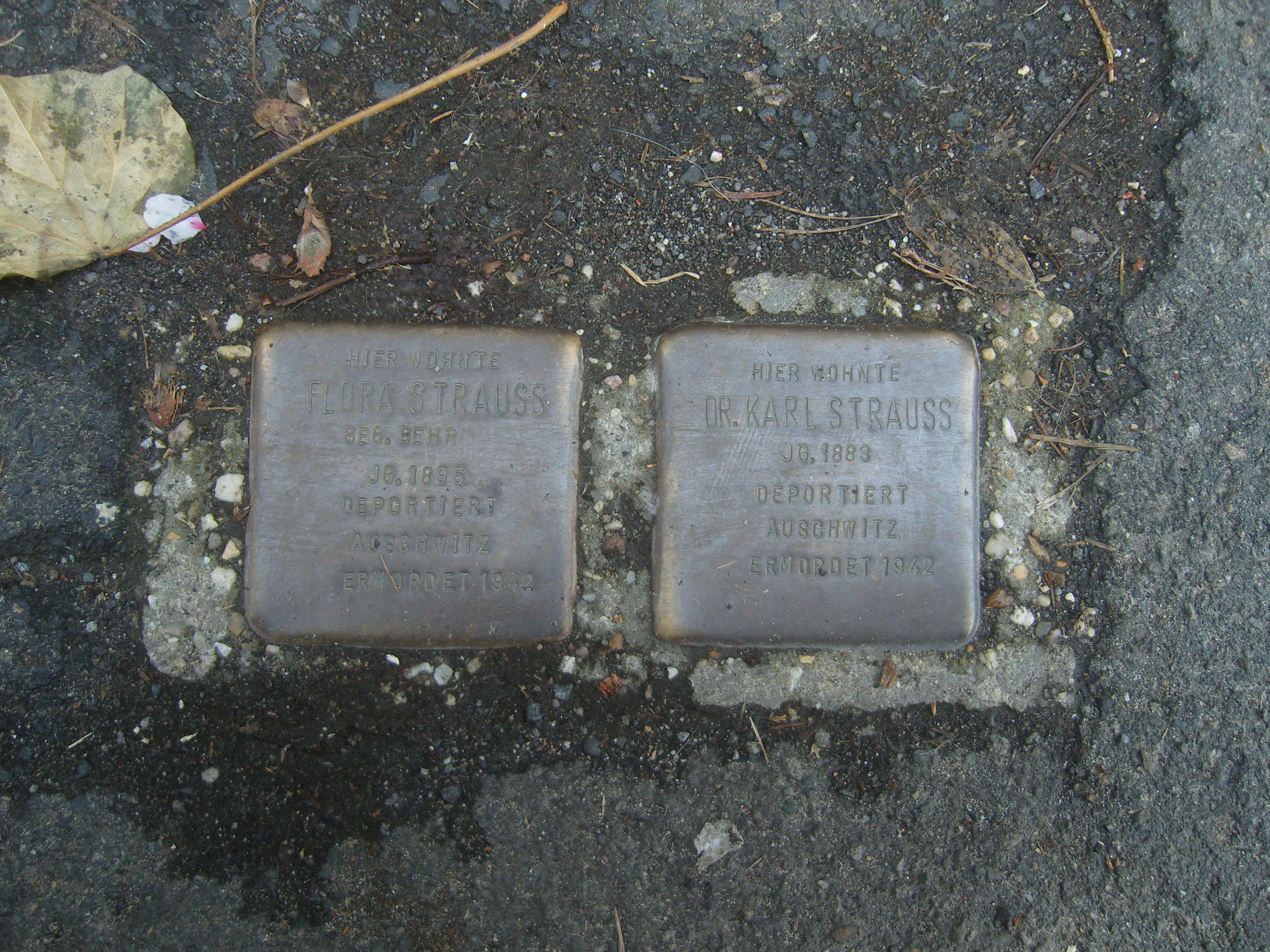
The Stolpersteine for Karl and Flora Strauß

In Neustadt, the artist, Gunter Demnig, has laid 41 so-called Stolpersteine, metal paving stones, in memory of the Jewish victims of Nazism. The first Stolperstein was laid on 6 December 2002 in front of the Kurfürst Ruprecht Gymnasium in Landwehrstraße in memory of Karl Strauß, a former teacher at the school.

On 10 March 2013, the Justice Minister for Rhineland-Palatinate, Jochen Hartloff, and Neustadt's Lord Mayor, Hans Georg Löffler, opened the memorial site to Nazi victims which had been established in the prison building of the old Turenne Barracks by a friends' association founded in 2009. Eighty years earlier, on 10 March 1933, the Nazis had established a concentration camp in the barracks for several months under the title of Schutzhaft- und Arbeitslager ("Protective Detention and Labour Camp"). About 500 men from over 80 Palatine municipalities were detained here who, due to their political or religious activities, had fallen foul of the authorities.

=== Museums ===
The town is home to the following museums: the town museum, Villa Böhm, the Otto Dill Museum, the Palatine Bible Museum, the "Getreidekasten" Vineyard Museum in the Herrenhof and the Neustadt/Weinstraße Railway Museum.

=== Regular events ===
Since 1949, as part of the German Wine Festival, the German Wine Queen has been chosen and crowned in Neustadt. The high point of the festival, which traditionally takes place at the end of September/beginning of October, is the largest Vintners' Parade in Germany.

Other wine festivals take place regularly, usually at weekends from almond blossom time in March/April until October. Especially well known are the Gimmeldingen Almond Blossom Festival, the Eselshautfest in Mußbach and the Andergasser Fest in Hambach.

At the end of August, the German Wine Road Adventure Day takes place, when the German Wine Road is closed to motorised traffic – even in Neustadt – and is only open to cyclists and pedestrians.

There's also a Christmas festival at the Marktplatz square in the Altstadt. A large Christmas tree is usually put on the north side of the square.

=== Patronage ===
Neustadt was the patron of the U-boat U 26 in the German Bundesmarine. Since 1978, it has sponsored a Lufthansa Airbus and, since 2000, ICE train of the Deutsche Bahn. In March 2007, it took on the sponsorship of a train on the Rhine-Neckar S-Bahn.

== Symbols ==
The symbols of Neustadt are Elwedritsche, mythical animals of local folklore. Depictions of them are carved on a well in the town centre.

== Transport ==
Neustadt is less than an hour away from the larger cities of Ludwigshafen, Mannheim, Kaiserslautern, Heidelberg, Karlsruhe and Frankfurt.

== Twin towns – sister cities ==
Neustadt an der Weinstraße is twinned with:

- Echt-Susteren, Netherlands
- Lincoln, United Kingdom
- Mâcon, France
- Manchester, United States
- Quanzhou, China
- Wernigerode, Germany
- Yenişehir, Turkey

== People ==
- Frederick II, Elector Palatine (1482–1556), Elector of the Palatinate from 1544 to 1556
- Johannes von Geissel (1796–1864), Cardinal, Archbishop of Cologne, Bishop of Speyer
- August Rothpletz (1853–1918), geologist, paleontologist
- Georg Balthazar von Neumayer, German polar explorer and scientist, died here in 1909
- Ludwig Wolff (1857–1919), chemist
- Franz Xaver Kugler (1862–1929), astronomer, chemist, mathematician, theologian
- Albert Fraenkel (1864–1938), physician, tuberculosis and heart researcher
- Karl Helfferich (1872–1924), banker, politician (DNVP) in the Weimar Republic
- Hans Geiger (1882–1945), physicist, inventor of the Geiger counter
- Hermann Künneth (1892–1975), mathematician
- Friedrich Siebert (SS member) (1903–1966), jurist, SS official
- Walter Bruch (1908–1990), electrical engineering technician, inventor of the PAL colour television system
- Willi Geiger (1909–1994), lawyer
- Fritz Wiedemann (1920–1987), painter, sculptor
- Herbert Culmann (1921–1998), lawyer, CEO of Deutsche Lufthansa AG
- Karlheinz Rudolph (1923–1994), television journalist
- Günther Osche (1926–2009), evolutionary biologist, ecologist, parasitologist
- Alfred Mechtersheimer (1939–2018), political scientist, politician, Member of Bundestag
- Jörg Zimmermann (born 1944), diplomat
- Heiner Goebbels (born 1952), musician, composer, radio play director, director
- Gregor Braun (born 1955), track cyclist, road bicycle racer
- Malu Dreyer (born 1961), jurist, politician (SPD), Rhineland-Palatinate Minister President since 2013
- Randolf Stich (1966–2023), politician (SPD)
- Uwe Wolf (born 1967), footballer
- Mario Basler (born 1968), football player, coach
- Bernhard Hoëcker (born 1970), comedian
- Sin With Sebastian (born 1971), pop singer
- Gustav Policella (born 1975), football player, coach
- Danko Bošković (born 1982), footballer
- Moritz Oeler (born 1985), water polo player
- Joseph Moog (born 1987), classical pianist and composer
- Dominique Heintz (born 1993), footballer
- Kevin Akpoguma (born 1995), footballer
