= August von Clemm =

German businessman and politician (1837–1910)

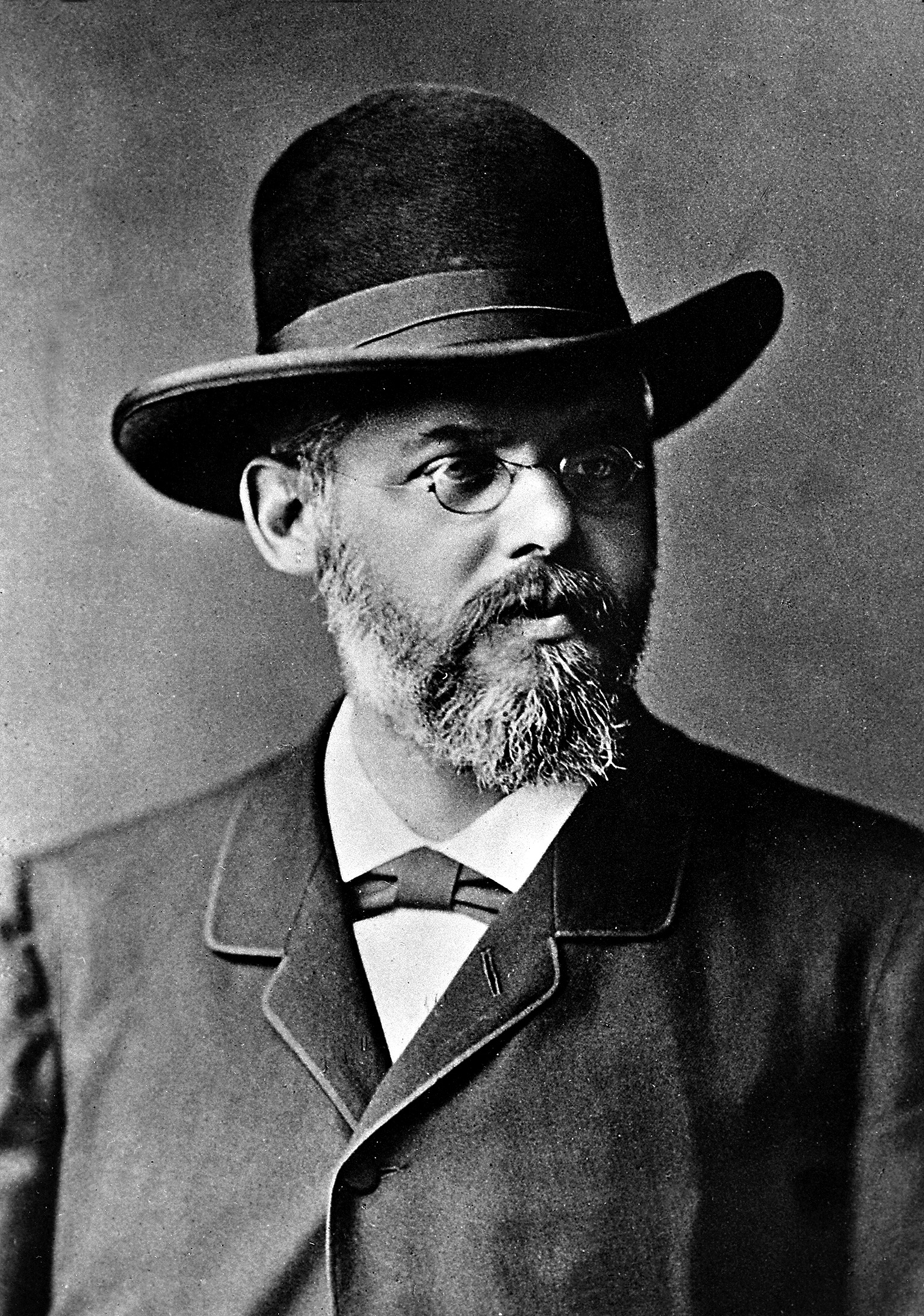
August von Clemm

August Ritter von Clemm (8 December 1837 in Gießen – 28 October 1910 in Haardt) was a German businessman and politician.

== Life and entrepreneurial career ==
After studying chemistry, Clemm relocated to Mannheim in 1862 to work for the Sonntag, Engelhorn & Clemm aniline fabrication company which had been founded by his brother Carl Clemm and Friedrich Engelhorn. In 1865, he founded BASF with his brother, Engelhorn, Seligmann Ladenburg, Friedrich Reiß and others and took over the management of aniline production in Ludwigshafen. When he became the representative of Engelhorn 1869, he left in 1882, BASF in a dispute with his brother. After the departure of Carl Clemm in 1885, Clemm went back to the supervisory board, which he headed from 1897 to 1903.

From 1872 to 1898, Clemm was President of the Palatine Trade and Commerce Bank (German: Pfälzischen Handels- und Gewerbebank) and in 1886 he co-founded the Palatine Mortgage Bank (German: Pfälzischen Hypothekenbank). In addition, Clemm was chairman of the board until the nationalization of the Palatine railways.

== Political career ==
From 1883 to 1899, Clemm was one for the National Liberal Party members of the Bavarian Chamber of Deputies (German: der Bayerischen Abgeordnetenkammer des Königreichs Bayern). In 1893, Clemm became its Vice-President and from 1897 to 1899, he served as its President.

== Honours ==
In 1892, Clemm was awarded with an honorary citizenship from the city of Ludwigshafen. In 1893, he was elevated to the status of nobility, and was thereafter known titled Ritter von Clemm and made a member of the Bavarian Imperial Council (German: Reichsrat).

== Literature ==
- Gustaf Jacob: Friedrich Engelhorn: Der Gründer der Badischen Anilin- und Sofa-Fabrik. Mannheim 1959
- Peter Ruf: Ludwigshafener Abgeordnete im Landtag, Reichstag und Bundestag. Ludwigshafen 1993, ISBN 3-924667-20-9
- Stadtarchiv der Stadt Ludwigshafen am Rhein (Hg.): Geschichte der Stadt Ludwigshafen am Rhein: Bd. 1: Von den Anfängen bis zum Ende des Ersten Weltkrieges. Ludwigshafen am Rhein 2003, ISBN 3-924667-35-7
