= Mußbach an der Weinstraße =

- Stadtteil of Neustadt an der Weinstraße
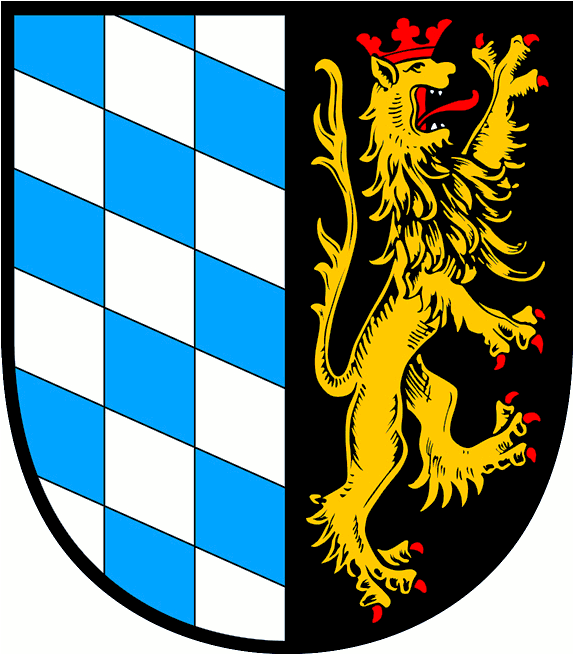
- Coat of arms

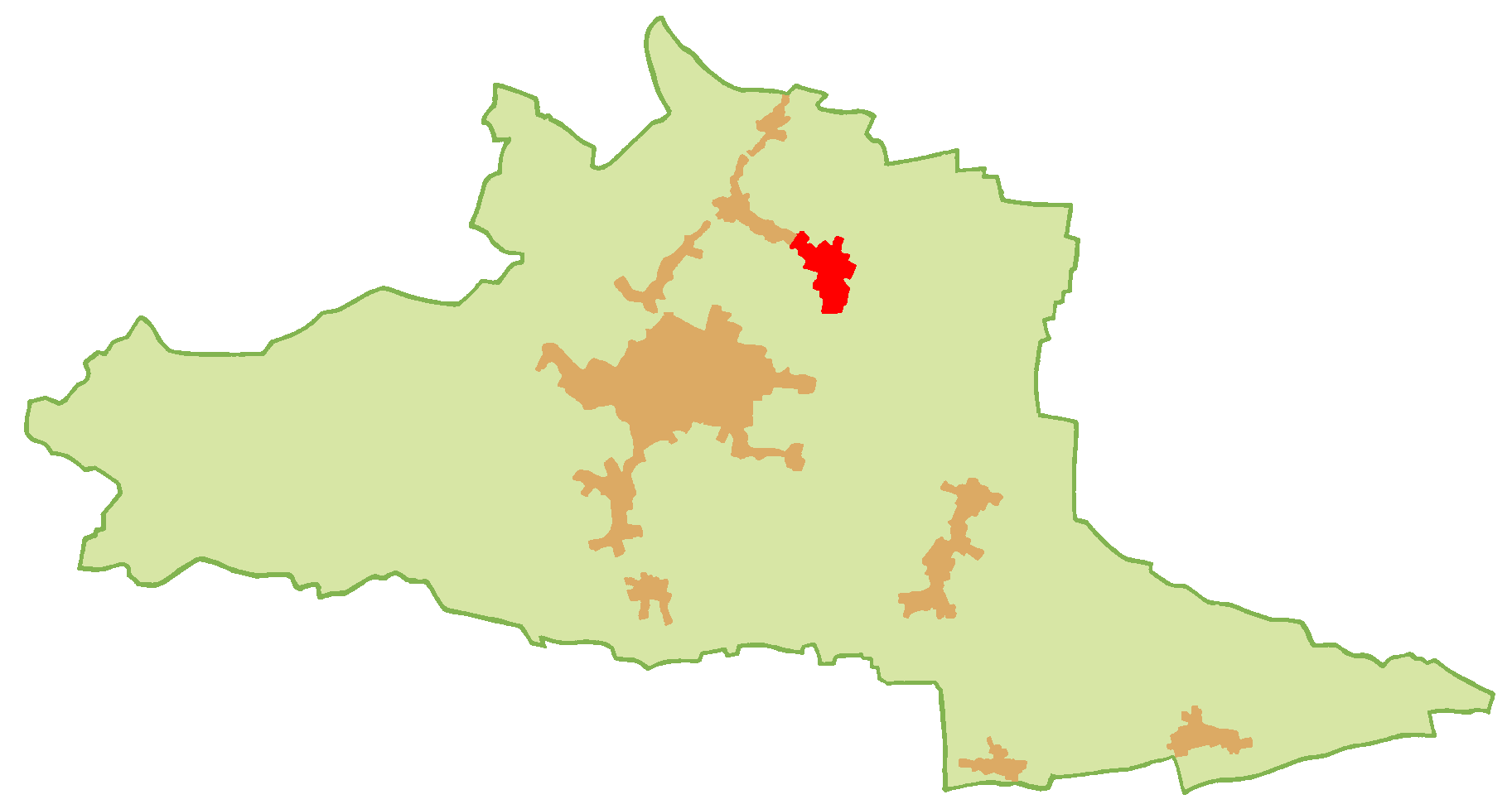
- Mußbach (red) within the city of Neustadt
- Interactive map of Mußbach an der Weinstraße
- Location within Germany Location within Rhineland-Palatinate
- Coordinates: 49°22′12″N 8°10′12″E
- Country: Germany
- State: Rhineland-Palatinate
- District: Urban district
- Town: Neustadt an der Weinstraße

Area
  - Total: 14.596 km^{2} (5.636 sq mi)
- Elevation: 145 m (476 ft)

Population (2019)
  - Total: 3,986
  - Density: 273.1/km^{2} (707.3/sq mi)
- Time zone: UTC+01:00 (CET)
  - Summer (DST): UTC+02:00 (CEST)
- Postal codes: 67435
- Dialling codes: 06321

Mußbach, in the local dialect Muschbach, was instituted as a city district of Neustadt an der Weinstraße in 1969 by the Rhineland-Palatinate regional reforms. In 1935 it received the oeconym 'on the Weinstraße' due to its wine-growing status. Since its institution the number of residents has grown to around 4000, making it the third most populous district of Neustadt. First mention of the locality as Muosbach is found in the inventories of the Abbey of Fulda from around 780.
