= Walking routes in the Palatine Forest =

Guide Through the Routes of Palatine Forest

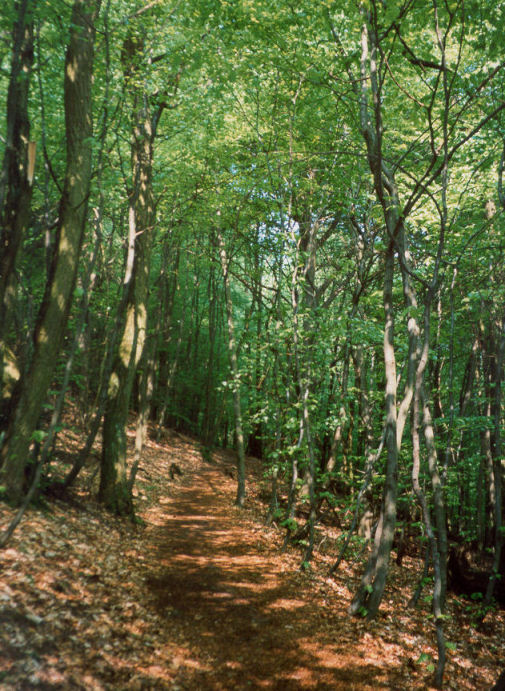
Typical waymarked Palatine Forest footpath

Walking routes in the Palatine Forest fall into two categories. The first are longer walking routes, most of which are maintained by the Palatine Forest Club (German: Pfälzerwald-Verein), or PWV, and which are linked to the national and international network of long distance paths. The second category are those local circular walks and themed walking routes, some of which are of wider regional importance, and which are maintained by municipal authorities. The Palatine Forest, as part of the Palatine Forest-North Vosges Biosphere Reserve, is an important conservation area. As a result, the Palatine Forest, the bunter sandstone landscape of the Palatine Forest Nature Park, the castles in the Dahner Felsenland and the cross-border paths into Alsace and the Vosges make the region particularly popular with ramblers and walkers.

== Long distance paths ==
This section lists those long distance paths that run through the Palatine Forest.

=== International long distance paths ===
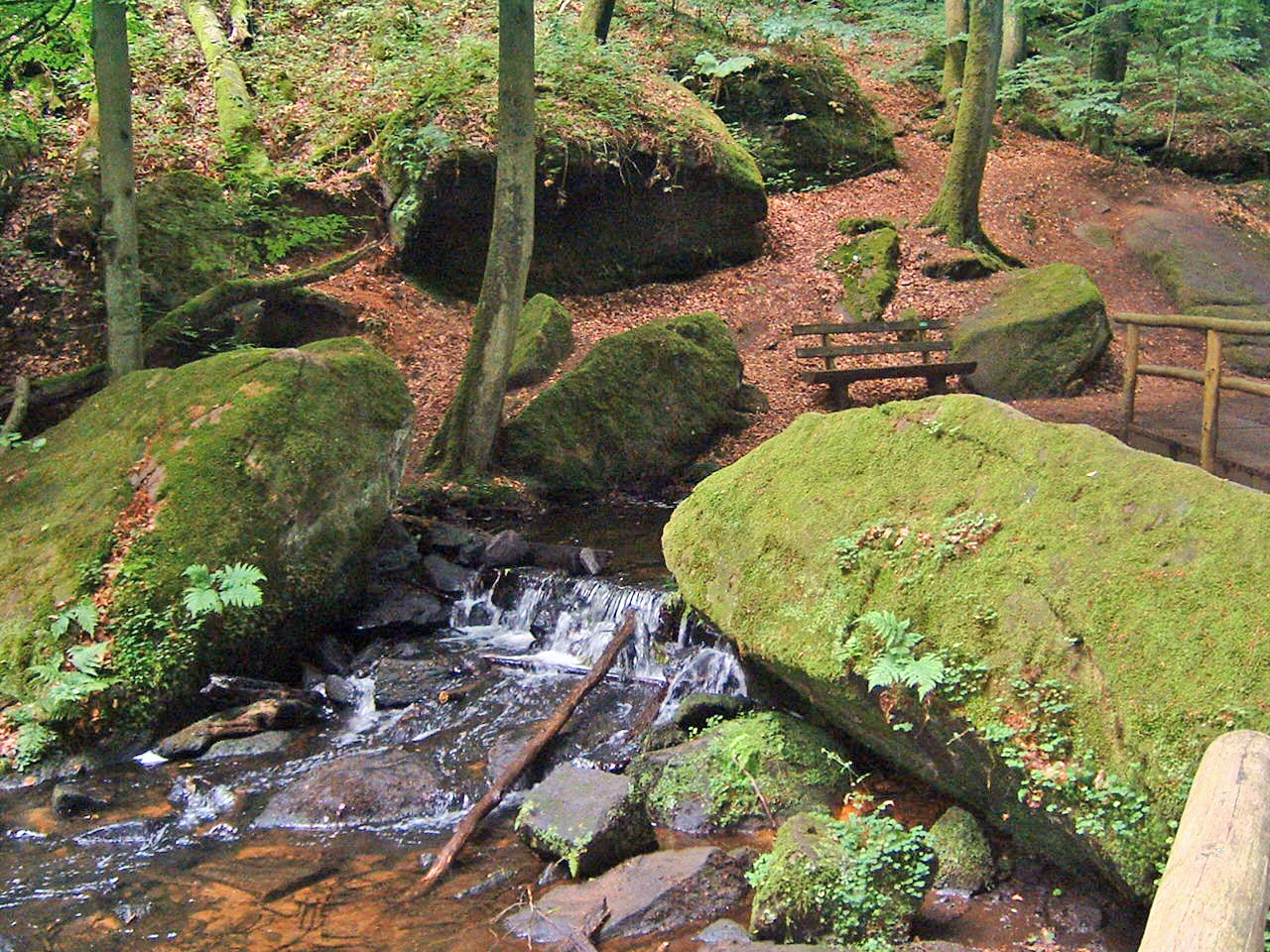
Path through the Karlstal valley along the Moosalb

The Palatine Ways of St. James are two historic pilgrimage routes from Speyer to Santiago de Compostela, signed by waymarks with a white scallop on blue field (German: Weiße Muschel auf blauem Grund), the symbol of Saint James. The historic, northern route ran along the Speyerbach, through the Frankenweide and the Karlstal valley towards the Landstuhl Marsh, past the pilgrimage church in Vogelbach, via Karlsberg to Homburg and from there via Hornbach Abbey to France. The present-day, less well known southern route runs partly along the Klingbach stream, through the Wasgau, and along the French border to Hornbach Abbey.

The E8 European long distance path from Ireland to Turkey runs through the state of Rhineland-Palatinate from the north along the River Rhine to the Donnersberg hill, then via Worms in the Odenwald (Hesse). An alternative E8 southern route runs through the Palatine Forest, as follows:

- along the Nahegau-Wasgau-Vosges long distance path (white cross) from Niederhausen an der Nahe via the Donnersberg and Hochspeyer to Johanniskreuz, and
- along the red cross trail from Johanniskreuz over the Eschkopf and Edenkoben to Speyer.

The international Nahegau-Wasgau-Vosges long distance path is waymarked by a white cross and runs from Niederhausen an der Nahe over the Donnersberg, the Schorlenberg, via Hochspeyer and Waldleiningen to Johanniskreuz (to here it is part of the southern branch of the E8 European long distance path). From Johanniskreuz, the trail runs via Leimen and Münchweiler an der Rodalb to Pirmasens. Heading for France, the route then runs via Pirmasens-Erlenbrunn, the Palatine Forest Club hut of Drei Buchen, Eppenbrunn, the Altschlossfelsen rocks and then over the border to Bitche and Wingen-sur-Moder in France.

The international Donnersberg-Donon long distance path is waymarked by a red bar and runs from Bad Kreuznach through the Donnersberg area and Palatine Forest to the Donon in Alsace. Its route through the Palatine Forest takes it via Kaiserslautern, the Aschbacherhof, Trippstadt, past Oberhammer and Leimen to the ruins of Gräfenstein Castle. From there it continues via Hinterweidenthal and the Neudahn Castle ruins, through Dahn, Bruchweiler and Rumbach to the French border at the Emperor William Rock (Kaiser-Wilhelm-Stein). The trail is designated as GR 53 on the French side and runs in several stages through the Alsace to the summit of the Donon.

The international Staudernheim-Soultz-sous-Forêts long distance path is signed with a blue bar and heads from Staudernheim on the River Nahe, through the Palatinate to Soultz-sous-Forêts in Alsace.

The international Pirmasens-Belfort long distance path is waymarked by a yellow bar and runs Pirmasens to Belfort south of the Vosges. Details of the various stages of the route are given below.

=== National long distance paths ===
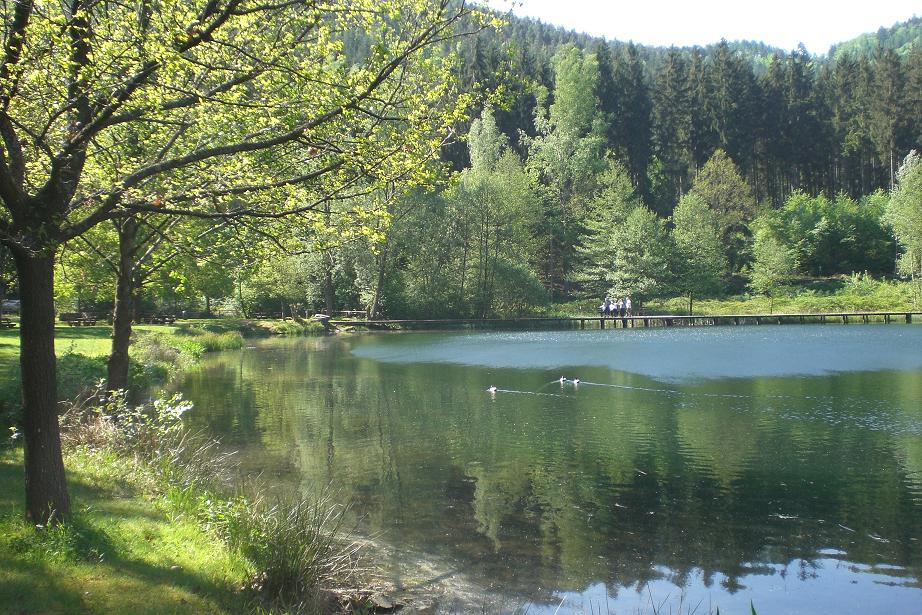
Several paths run past the bathing lake of Helmbachweiher.

The Saar-Rhine-Main long distance path (Fernwanderweg Saar-Rhein-Main) is signed with a yellow cross and runs through the Palatine Forest and Rhenish Hesse to the River Main, more specifically from Homburg via Höheinöd, Waldfischbach, the Hundsweiher Sawmill and the Schwarzbachtal to Johanniskreuz. From there it continues through Elmstein, along the Helmbach to Erfenstein, then via Lambrecht to the Palatine Forest Club hut of Lambertskreuz. The last stage of the path within the Palatine Forest runs over the Hardenburg, Altleiningen and Eisenberg to Rhenish Hesse, and there via Alzey to Wörth am Main.

The Franconia-Hesse-Palatinate long distance path (Fernwanderweg Franken-Hessen-Kurpfalz) runs from Aschaffenburg via Speyer and finally through the Palatine Forest, waymarked with a red cross, to Lichtenberg Castle. Its route through the Forest goes fromd Edenkoben, Naturfreundehaus Sauermilchtälchen, via Taubensuhl and the Eschkopf to Johanniskreuz (to this point it is part of the southern branch of the E 8 European long distance path). From Johanniskreuz it continues to the Oberhammer and through the Karlstal valley to the Friends of Nature house (Naturfreundehaus) of Finsterbrunnertal, then runs past the Gelterswoog to Landstuhl. Passing Kusel the path finally reaches Lichtenberg Castle.

==== Saar-Rhine trails ====
These two trails run from Saarbrücken through the Palatine Forest to the River Rhine near Wörth.

The green bar footpath in the Palatine Forest runs from Zweibrücken-Niederauerbach via Contwig, Walshausen, and Bottenbach to Kröppen. From there it goes via Eppenbrunn and Ludwigswinkel, Petersbächel and Schönau to Nothweiler, before finally passing through Bobenthal heading for Sankt Germanshof on the French border. The route continues further via Schweigen-Rechtenbach towards Bienwald.

The path waymarked by a black dot on a white bar runs from Saarbrücken (Schafbrücke) through the Palatine Forest into the Anterior Palatinate as far as Rülzheim. Its course through the Forest goes from Landstuhl, via the Gelterswoog and Kaiserslautern, continuing on the historic mountain road past Hochspeyer to Frankenstein, through the Jägertal valley to Bad Dürkheim, before heading along the Haardt to Bad Bergzabern, and then finally east via the Bienwald to Rülzheim.

== Regional paths ==
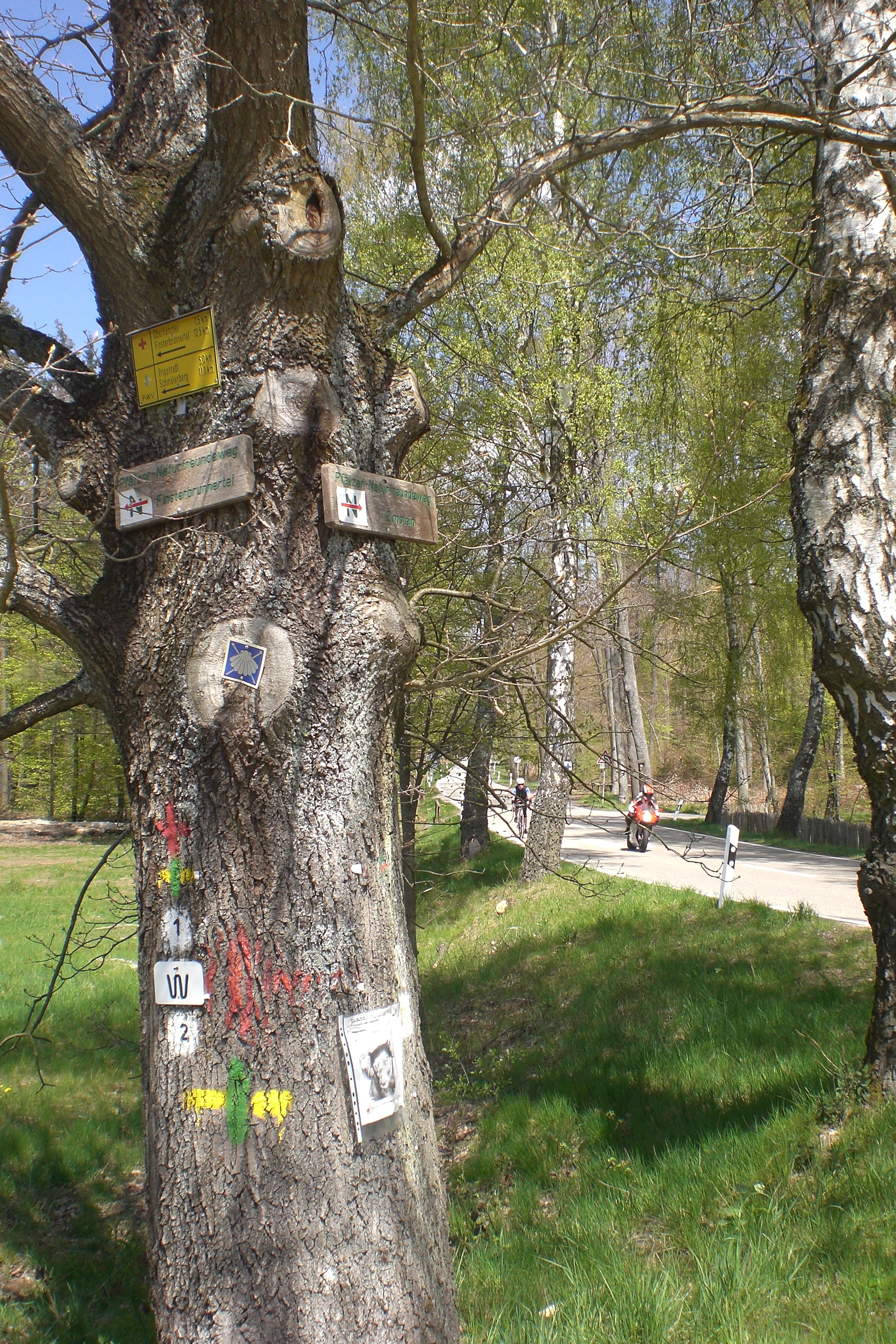
Waymarks at the hamlet of Johanniskreuz

This section lists the walking routes of the Palatine Forest region.

=== Walking network of the Palatine Forest ===
==== Paths through Johanniskreuz (waymark: coloured cross) ====
In addition to the long distance paths waymarked by a white cross, red cross and yellow cross, all other paths in the Palatine Forest that are marked with a cross pass through the hamlet of Johanniskreuz (the name means "St John's Cross"):

Blue cross: from Niederhausen on the River Nahe via Kaiserslautern to Johanniskreuz, then via the Weißenberg mountain and Bad Bergzabern to Sankt Germanshof.

Green cross: from Freinsheim via Weidenthal to Johanniskreuz, then via Münchweiler an der Rodalb and Pirmasens-Ruhbank to the Erlenkopf hill.

Green and yellow cross: from Oberbexbach via Schopp and Trippstadt to Johanniskreuz, via Iggelbach and Neustadt an der Weinstraße to Ludwigshafen-Rheingönheim.

==== West Palatinate Way (waymark: coloured W) ====
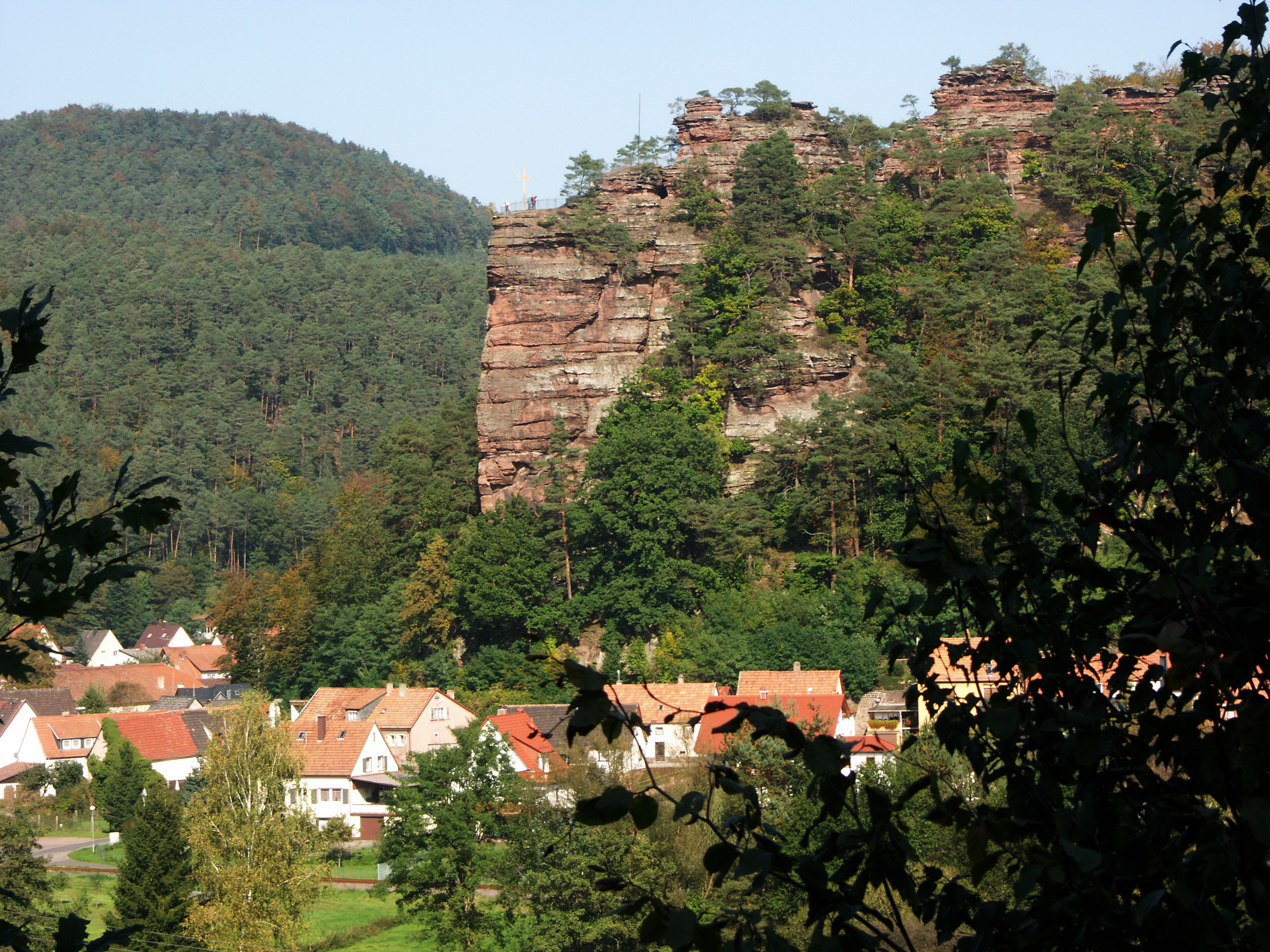
Dahner Felsenland

On the West Palatinate Way, waymarked with a coloured letter W, the Association for the Promotion of Tourism in the West Palatinate (Verein zur Förderung des Tourismus in der Westpfalz) used to offer guided tours with luggage transfer. Both this service and its waymarking have not been maintained since 2009.

==== Waymark: coloured bars ====
Green and blue bars: this route runs from Göllheim to Eppenbrunn. Its waypoints include Alsenborn, Frankenstein, Schwarzsohl Hut (PWV), Breitenstein, Eußerthal, Rinnthal, Schwanheim and Erfweiler.

Green and white bars: starting at Wasener Kreuz (west of Hertlingshausen, on the A6 motorway) this route runs through Lambertskreuz, Neidenfels, Esthal, Breitenstein, Forsthaus Heldenstein and St. Martin.

White and blue bars: called the Alsenz Valley Trail, this path runs from Bad Münster am Stein via Rockenhausen to the Palatine Forest, and then runs via Alsenborn and Hochspeyer to the Palatine Forest Club hut of Forsthaus Schwarzsohl. From there it continues to Helmbach, through the Dörenbach valley to Eußerthal, and via Annweiler and Waldrohrbach to Klingenmünster. From here the trail passes through Gleiszellen, runs past the Silzer Linde, and the Palatine Forest Club hut of Hirzeck on the French border to St. Germanshof.

White and blue bars: the second route with this waymark is further east in the Palatine Forest. The starting point os Battenberg. Running past the Hardenburg castle, Eckkopf (west of Deidesheim), with a branch to the Stabenberg mountain, and Weinbiet to Neustadt an der Weinstraße, Haßloch, Germersheim before ending in Wörth am Rhein.

White and red bars: one path with this waymark runs from the Palatine Forest to Speyer on the Rhine. Its waypoints are Kaiserslautern, Waldleiningen, Schwarzsohl, Esthal, Erfenstein, Hellerplatz, Neustadt an der Weinstraße, Ordenswald/Haßloch, Fronmühle and Speyer.

White and red bars: another route with this waymark begins in the Krumbachtal valley, runs to Bad Dürkheim, continues along the edge of the Haardt mountains, before passing Heidenlöcher, St. Michael's Chapel near Deidesheim and Gimmeldingen before reaching Neustadt.

Blue and yellow bars: This path, which runs from Lauterecken through the North Palatine Uplands to the Palatinate Forest, then passes through Otterberg and the Eselsfürth heading for Hochspeyer; from here it goes via Waldleiningen and the Mückenwiese to Speyerbrunn in the Elmstein valley. It then continues along the Erlenbachs stream to Hofstätten and the Annweiler Forsthaus, then via Wilgartswiesen and Hauenstein to the Palatine Forest Club hut of Dicke Eiche. Finally it goes via Erlenbach bei Dahn and Reisdorf on the French border to St. Germanshof.

White and green bars: the path runs from the Obere Eselsmühle mill via Enkenbach-Alsenborn, Diemerstein and Frankenstein to Weidenthal. It continues via the Goldbrunnen, Esthal and Erfenstein to the Palatine Forest Club hut of Totenkopf. It then makes its way through the Hüttenhohl to the summit of the Kalmit which, at 673 metres, is the highest mountain in the Palatine Forest (with a managed Palatine Forest Club hut), before descending from the Haardt mountains to Maikammer.

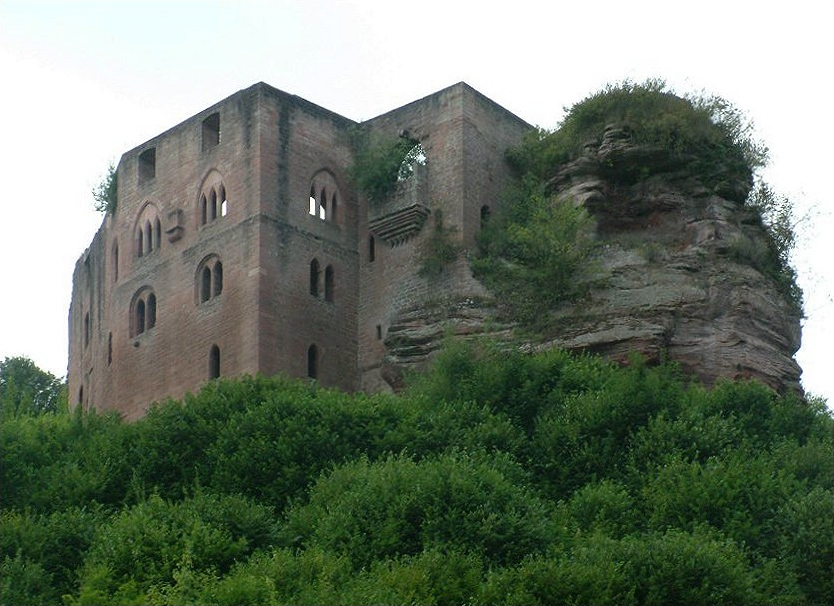
Frankenstein Castle, which may be reached on the green and red, green and blue and black dot on white bar trails

Green and red bars: the path from Kaiserslautern into Leininger Land heads initially eastwards past Hochspeyer and through Fischbach to Frankenstein, then turns north via Hertlingshausen, past Altleiningen and Altleiningen Castle as far as Kleinkarlbach, below Neuleiningen Castle.

Blue and red bars: the footpath starts in Kirchheimbolanden and runs via Elmstein, Iggelbach, Hofstätten, Hermersberger Hof and Hinterweidenthal toPirmasens.

Yellow and red bars: One of these waymarked paths is unusual in that it does not begin (or end, depending on your viewpoint) in a settlement, but on the B 48 federal road in Wellbachtal. Its route takes it through Wilgartswiesen, Hauenstein, Dahn, Schindhard, past the ruins of Lindelbrunn Castle, through Silz and the ruins of Landeck, out of the Palatine Forest into the Anterior Palatinate to Rülzheim.

Yellow and red bars: the other route with this waymarking begins at Lichtenberg Castle, heading for Wallhalben. It then runs via Thaleischweiler-Fröschen, Burgalben, along the valley of Schwarzbachtal, over the Eschkopf, through Elmstein, Esthal and Mainzertal (on the B 39 federal road), and past the Drachenfels before finishing in Wachenheim.

Red and white bars: beginning in Niederwürzbach the route passed through Erfweiler, Hauenstein, Hermersberger Hof, Eußerthal, Dernbach and Gleisweiler before ending in Böchingen.

Yellow bar: the walk begins near Blieskastel and runs through Contwig, Leimen (Pfalz), Hofstätten, Taubensuhl (Landau Municipal Forest), Eußerthal and Annweiler before reaching Germersheim am Rhein.

Yellow bar: the second path with this waymark in the Palatine Forest is part of the Pirmasens-Belfort long distance path and is located further south in the Palatine Forest. Its westernmost point is the town of Pirmasens. It then heads for Dahn, Busenberg, Erlenbach (near Dahn), Birkenhördt, Bad Bergzabern, Schweigen-Rechtenbach, Weißenburg/Wissembourg (F) and ends in Belfort.

Yellow bar: the third path with this waymarking runs from Glanbrücken to Eiswoog, Frankenstein, Friedrichsbrunnen, Lambertskreuz and Wachenheim.

Red bar: another sign used on several paths. For the first one, see above in the section on international long distance paths. The second one is a very short trail starting at Lambertskreuz, then running via Neidenfels, Lambrecht and Hellerplatz to Breitenstein.

Red bar: the third route begins in Neuleiningen, crosses Bad Dürkheim and Wachenheim, continues along the edge of the Haardt to Neustadt an der Weinstraße, St. Martin, Frankweiler and Siebeldingen.

Blue bar: branching off the above long distance path with this marking, it is a short stretch from Drei Buchen ("Three Beeches") to Burrweiler an der Weinstraße.

==== Waymark: coloured dots ====
Blue dot: from Hauptstuhl via Martinshöhe and Wallhalben to Steinalben; then from here via Heltersberg to Leimen.

Blue dot: from Neustadt-Diedesfeld through the Klausental valley up to the Hahnenschritt on the Kalmit.

Blue dot: from Lindenberg via Weinbiet to Neustadt.

Yellow dot: from Helmbach (Elmstein) to the Helmbachweiher, then to the Hornesselwiese and on to the end of the route on the Taubensuhl.

Yellow dot: from Kettrichhof along the Hohe Straße ("High Road") to Lemberg, past the Maiblumenfels and the annex of Salzwoog to Hinterweidenthal. From there via Vier Buchen and Winterkirchel to the PWV hut of Dicke Eiche ("Fat Oak") and then to Erfweiler. Finally it goes via Dahn and the Napoleonsfelsen rocks to Fischbach.

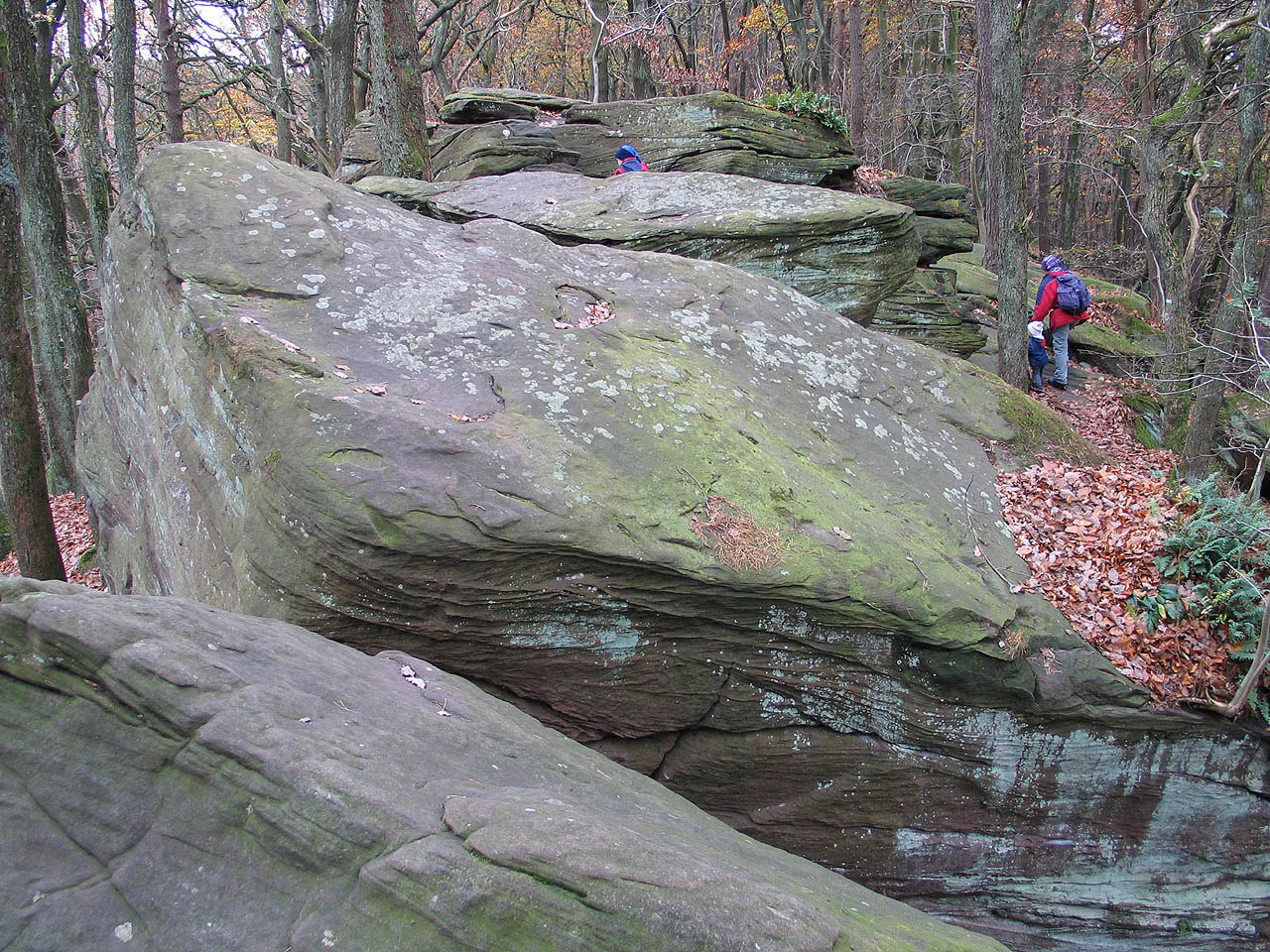
The felsenmeer on the Kalmit

Red dot: the path from Hertlingshausen (Carlsberg) along the Haardt to the French border runs via Kieskautberg and Rahnfels to Bad Dürkheim, then from Wachenheim via the Heidenlöcher to Deidesheim, and through the Mühltal valley up to the Stabenberg. From there through the Benjental and over the Weinbiet (Palatine Forest Club or PWV hut) past the ruins of Wolfsburg Castle to Neustadt an der Weinstraße. From the central station the path runs over the Nollen Saddle up to the Hohe Loog and then on to the Kalmit (673 m), past the ruins of Kropsburg to the Palatine Forest Club hut of Hüttenbrunnen. The route then runs past the ruinos of Rietburg, via Weyher, through the Modenbach valley, to Drei Buchen and Ramberg. Passing the ruins of Ramburg, the Palatine Forest Club huts – the Böchinger Hut and Siebeldinger Hut – the path climbs the Almersberg, and drops again into the Wellbach valley to Rinnthal. Via the Buchholzfelsen and Spirkelbach it continues to Hauenstein, past the Kreuzfelsen rocks to the PWV's hut Wasgau Hut. Finally the "red dot" trail runs via Darstein, the Lindelbrunn Hut, Lauterschwan, the Hirzeck Hut, to Bobenthal and then through the Klaffental valley to the border crossing of Kehlingen (Petit Wingen).

White dot: this waymark is found where link paths have been established between the main routes and walking trails. It is possible to switch to another route. These signs are, however, rather uncommon.

==== Certified paths ====
The Palatinate Tourist Office worked in cooperation with the Association of German Mountain and Hiking Clubs (Deutscher Wanderverband) on the routes for three certified paths which were opened in April 2011, two of which run through the Palatine Forest:

- The Palatine Wine Path (Pfälzer Weinsteig, 153 km, ten one-day stages) runs from north to south from Neuleiningen along the Haardt mountains to Schweigen-Rechtenbach.
- The Palatine Forest Path (Pfälzer Waldpfad, 142 km, nine one-day stages) runs from Kaiserslautern through the Palatine Holzland and the Wasgau also to Schweigen-Rechtenbach.

=== Themed walks ===
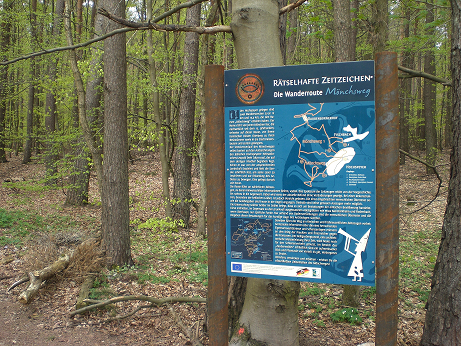
The Monk's Way (Mönchsweg) themed walk near Hochspeyer

- Baumwipfelpfad ("Treetop Path") – at the Fischbach Biosphere House. The path, for which a fee is payable, runs through the trees and treetops at heights of up to 35 metres for a distance of 270 metres. Nearby there is a Water Experience Way (Wasser-Erlebnis-Weg).
- Waterway trail on the Moosalbe (Gewässerwanderweg an der Moosalbe) – this is one of seven walks on the subject of water engineering in Rhineland-Palatinate. The way runs for over 33 km along the Moosalbe and Hirschalbe streams. Information provided by the Ministry for the Environment and Forests at various waypoints covers the topics of:

- Mills, weirs and springs,
- Springs, water structures and ecosystems.

- Rätselhafte Zeitzeichen – historical themed walk by the municipal authorities of Enkenbach-Alsenborn and Hochspeyer, with the following sections:

- Hochfelsweg ("High Rock Way") (12 km)
- Keltenweg ("Celtic Way" and Römerweg ("Roman Way") (9 km)
- Mönchsweg ("Monk's Way") I (12 km) und Mönchsweg II (14 km)
- Schanzenweg ("Fieldwork Way") (13 km)
- Sonnwendweg ("Solstice Way") (9 km)

- Skulpturenweg Rheinland-Pfalz ("Rhineland-Palatinate Sculpture Way") – this sculpture walk is planned in future to run through the whole of Rhineland-Palatinate. It currently comprises local sections. These are found in the Palatine Forest at:

- Schweinstal, Krickenbach, Queidersbach
- Trippstadt, Stelzenberg
- Trippstadt, Johanniskreuz

- Spurensuche ("Tracking") – four forest history walks in the Johanniskreuz forest district:

Footpath (Weg) 1 (yellow, 21 km, 21 stations) via Lauberhof, Karlstal and Meiserhof.
Footpath 2 (red, 14.5 km, 21 stations) via Erlenbach and Eschkopf.
Footpath 3 (blue, 19.5 km, 21 Stations) via Dämmchen, Mückenwiese and Speyerbrunn.
Footpath 4 (green, 19 km, 22 Stations, not from Johanniskreuz, but Trippstadt) via Antonihof and Aschbacherhof.

- The Rodalber Felsenweg ("Rodalb Rock Way", circular path, 43.305 km, 5 stages are recommended that increase the total length, including approach and departure routes to 61.9 km) was laid out by the Palatinate Forest Club and the municipalities of Rodalben in the early 1990s. It snakes through various side valleys around Rodalben and passes 26 bizarre rock formations of bunter sandstone that are typical of the region. In 2007 it was elevated by the German Rambling Association to a certified trail.
- The Brunnenwanderweg ("Fountain Trail") near Heltersberg: the trail was opened in 2009 and is 40.3 km long, has 64 theme-related stations and in the area around the village of Heltersberg. The 30 or so voluntary renovated fountains form the highlight of the path; other features include near-natural, unique mixed woods and bizarre rock formations (crags and blockfields). The cultural historic background to the trail is documented on detailed information boards and a guide brochure.

=== Local footpaths ===
Many villages and municipalities in the Palatine Forest have marked out local footpaths. These circular routes are usually waymarked with numbers and are of short to medium length, mainly used by local people. The care of these circular walks (waymarking, clearing) has been very neglected in recent years due to lower demand and tighter budgets. As a result, some can only be located with the aid of topographic maps.

== Common waymarking systems ==
Since the foundation of the Palatine Forest Club and the Vosges Club (French: Club Vosgien) about 100 years ago, both rambling clubs have used almost identical waymarking systems. As a result, not only are cross-border walks made very easy but it also supports the fact that the Palatinate Forest and the Vosges form a single unit from both a geomorphological and a topographical perspective, and should therefore really only be viewed as two halves of an overarching mountain range on the left bank of the Rhine.

== Literature ==
- Klaus Frölich: Natur und Kultur an den Wanderwegen des PWV, Teil I : Kreuzmarkierungen. In: Pfälzerwaldverein (Hrsg): Wanderführer, Broschüren usw.. Selbstverlag Neustadt/W. 2006.
- Klaus Frölich: Burgenwanderweg – Teil II. In: Pfälzerwaldverein (Hrsg): Wanderführer, Broschüren usw.. Selbstverlag Neustadt/W. o. J.
- Pfälzerwaldverein (Hrsg): Zabernweg-Führer, Wanderweg zwischen Rheinzabern – Bad Bergzabern – Saverne (170 km). Selbstverlag Neustadt/W. o. J.
- Kurt Reh: Der Pfälzerwald - eine Einführung in Landschaft und Namengebung.In: Michael Geiger u. a. (Hrsg): Pfälzische Landeskunde, Beiträge zu Geographie, Biologie, Volkskunde und Geschichte. Bd. 1. Selbstverlag, Landau/Pf. 1981, S. 379-388.
- Susanne Rieß-Stumm: Pfälzer Jakobswege. 9. Auflage. Kuntz Verlag, Gleishorbach 2009, ISBN 978-3-933507-03-7.
- Barbara Christine Titz, Jörg-Thomas Titz: Pfälzerwald und Deutsche Weinstraße: 50 ausgewählte Tal- und Höhenwanderungen der Region Leiningerland, Haardt, Weinstraße und Pfälzerwald. 4. Auflage. Bergverlag Rother, Oberhaching 2009, ISBN 978-3-7633-4268-6.
