= Counts of Wartenberg =

Original coat of arms

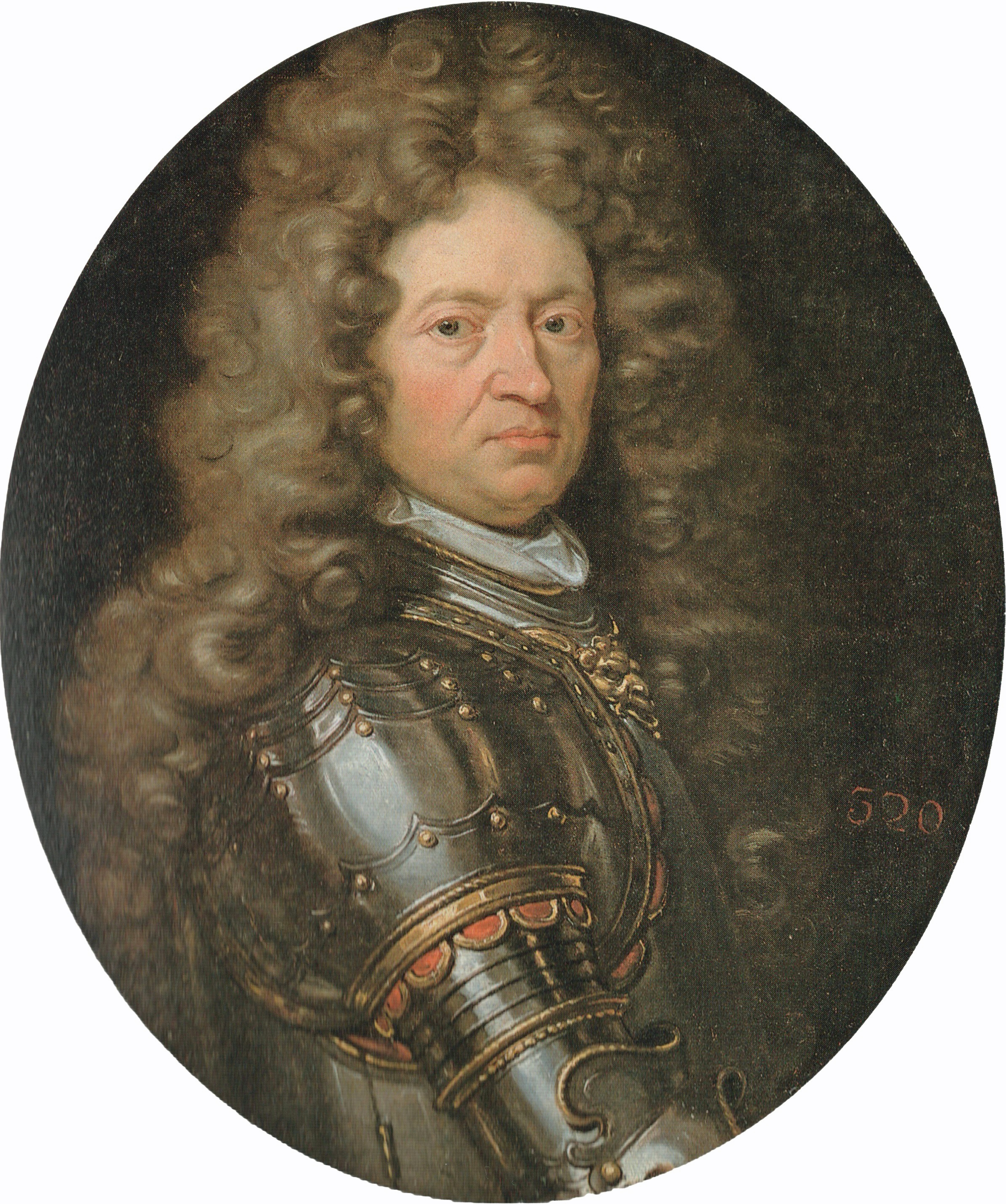
Johann Casimir II Kolb von Wartenberg, the 1st Count of Wartenberg

The House of Wartenberg (German: Grafen von Wartenberg) was an important German comital family (Grafen) which held large territories in Rhenish Hesse, Electoral Palatinate and Upper Swabia.

== Origins ==
The distant origins of this family are speculative yet seem to originate in the northwestern edge of the Palatinate Forest, east of modern-day France. The Kolb von Wartenberg family took its name from Castle Wartenberg built in the present day Kaiserslautern which was destroyed in 1522. Its territories belonged until the late 18th century to the Upper Rhenish Circle and included properties in Wachenheim, Kaiserslautern and Mettenheim. After the left bank of Rhine was taken over by the French revolutionary troops in 1794 and subsequently integrated into the French First Republic, the County of Wartenberg was dissolved. As a compensation for the loss of their estates, the Counts of Wartenberg received in 1802 the Rot an der Rot Abbey in Upper Swabia. The monastery's possessions included thirteen villages and hamlets with a total of 2871 subjects. The new county then became known as County of Wartenberg-Roth. In 1804, the last Count of Wartenberg, Ludwig, adopted his two nephews Counts Franz Carl Friedrich and Franz Georg Friedrich of Erbach-Erbach who upon Ludwig's death inherited not only the title Wartenberg-Roth, but also the Lordship of Roth's estates of Erbach and Reichenbach in Hesse and the Lordships of Wildenstein and Steinbach in Bavaria.

After the Congress of Vienna in 1816, the ancestral territory, which belonged to this noble family, became part of the Kingdom of Bavaria, except for Mettenheim, which was absorbed into the Grand Duchy of Hesse.

== County of Wartenberg ==
County of Wartenberg-Roth Grafschaft Wartenberg-Roth
- 8th century–1806
- Status: County
- Capital: Wartenberg-Rohrbach
- Historical era: Middle Ages
  - Founded: before 812 8th century
  - Mediatised to Westphalia: 1806
  - Annexed to Prussia: 1814
| Succeeded by |
| Duchy of Westphalia / Duchy of Westphalia |

The historical County of Wartenberg included the townships Aspach, Diemerstein, Ellerstadt, Fischbach, Imbsbach, Marienthal, Ober- und Nieder-Mehlingen, Mettenheim, Oranienhof, Rohrbach, Sembach, Wachenheim und Wartenberg.

== See also ==
- House of Wartenberg, an extinct aristocratic family from Bohemia
