= West Palatinate Way =

- Trailheads

The West Palatinate Way (German: Westpfalz-Wanderweg or, officially, Großer Westpfalz-Wanderweg) was a marked footpath that crossed the West Palatinate region in Germany, but is no longer maintained. The concept for this route emerged in 1980 from its sponsor the Association for the Promotion of Tourism in the West Palatinate (Verein zur Förderung des Tourismus in der Westpfalz) and was a cooperative venture between the counties in the West Palatinate, the Palatine Forest Club (a rambling club) and local pubs and restaurants. In 2006 and 2007, overnight bookings fell and, since 2009, the sponsors have no longer taken bookings and maintenance of the footpath and its waymarks has only been carried out in places by the Palatinate Club. The disbandment of the tourist association has also been discussed.

== Route ==
The West Palatinate Way began in the Kaiserslautern district of Hohenecken and ran through Leimen, Hauenstein, Rumbach, Ludwigswinkel, Eppenbrunn and back via Landstuhl, Wolfstein, Rockenhausen, Kirchheimbolanden, Eisenberg and Hochspeyer to Hohenecken.

It was 409 kilometres long overall and thus the longest waymarked circular path in Germany. The path had a cross link between Kaiserslautern and Landstuhl so that it could be split into northern and southern halves.

The Great West Palatinate Way was one of 12 West Palatinate paths that were laid out and maintained by the tourist association.

Waymarking of the route was the responsibility of the Palatine Forest Club. Waymarks on the main route were a stylized white or black W, branches were given signs in other colours.
