= Hochspeyer (Verbandsgemeinde) =

Coordinates: 49.443°N 7.895°E

Hochspeyer is a former Verbandsgemeinde ("collective municipality") in the district of Kaiserslautern, Rhineland-Palatinate, Germany. The seat of the Verbandsgemeinde was in Hochspeyer. On 1 July 2014, it merged into the Verbandsgemeinde Enkenbach-Alsenborn.

== Municipalities ==
The Verbandsgemeinde Hochspeyer consisted of the following Ortsgemeinden ("local municipalities"):

1. Fischbach
2. Frankenstein
3. Hochspeyer
4. Waldleiningen
