= Kaiserslautern Basin =

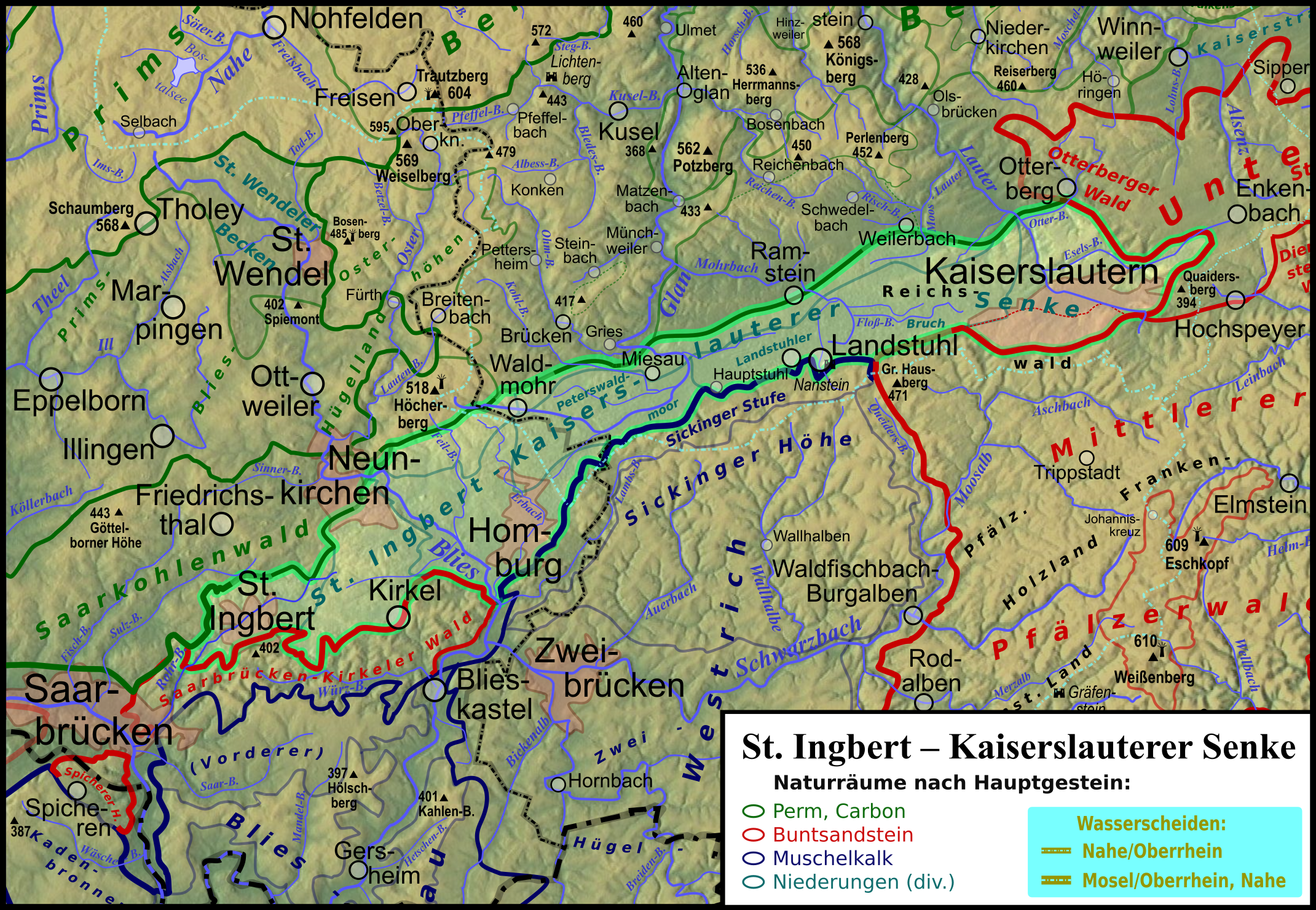
Natural map of the St. Ingbert-Kaiserslautern Depression

The Kaiserslautern Basin (German: Kaiserslauterer Senke) is part of the link between Lorraine and the northern Upper Rhine Lowland. In the centre of the Kaiserslautern Basin lies the Landstuhl Marsh (Landstuhler Bruch), also called the West Palatine Moor Depression ( Westpfälzische Moorniederung) or Westrich Moor Depression (Westricher Moorniederung).

== Location and boundaries ==
The basin extends in length from east to west for about 50 kilometres from the area around Bexbach to Alsenborn. Its width varies between three and seven kilometres. The landscape ends in the east at the Palatine Forest, in the south on the edge of the Zweibrücken Westrich and in the north at North Palatine Uplands and covers a total of 236 km^{2}. Its height varies between 225 and 250 metres above sea level (NN).

== Morphology ==
The region, which lies entirely within bunter sandstone, was cultivated 200 years ago. Since then, as well as bogs, meadows and woods, there have also been fields. The woodland has since developed from mixed forest into almost pure coniferous forest. Previously the Kaiserslautern Basin was a giant wetland area. The many small wells in and around the city of Kaiserslautern emerged when the basin was partially drained, as many natural springs were fed into pipes.
