= Palatine Forest Mountain Bike Park =

Mountain bike trail network in the Palatinate Forest, Germany

The Palatine Forest Mountain Bike Park (German: Mountainbikepark Pfälzerwald) in the Palatinate Forest is a mountain bike trail network in Germany, in the centre of the biosphere reserve of the Palatinate Forest-North Vosges. The network was opened in April 2005.

== Routes ==
The signposted, single-track routes differ in the grade of challenge:

- Route 1, starting at Rodalben, 54 km, with a 9.8 km, single-track section
- Route 2, starting at Waldfischbach-Burgalben, 48 km, with a 6.8 km single-track section
- Route 3, starting at Schopp, 67 km, with a 9.7 km single-track section
- Route 4, starting at Hochspeyer, 64 km, with a 14.3 km single-track section
- Route 5, starting at Lambrecht, 74 km, with a 12.5 km single-track section

== Responsibility ==
The Tourist Board of the Palatinate Forest region, especially the municipalities of Kaiserslautern-Süd, Lambrecht, Rodalben, Waldfischbach-Burgalben, and Hochspeyer, developed the project with the support of the regional forest commission and the University of Kaiserslautern.

The park's administrative headquarters are in the collective municipality of Kaiserslautern-Süd.
