= Rahnfels =

- Location within Rhineland-Palatinate

Highest point
- Elevation: 517 m above sea level (NN) (1,696 ft)
- Coordinates: 49°28′18″N 8°05′23″E

Geography
- Location: Rhineland-Palatinate, Germany
- Parent range: Palatine Forest

Geology
- Rock type: Bunter sandstone

The Rahnfels is a hill in the Palatine Forest in Germany, about 2 kilometres northwest of the ruins of Hardenburg castle. With a summit height of 517 m above NN the Rahnfels is the highest point in the Palatine Forest north of the River Isenach.

== Summit plateau ==
On the summit plateau of the Rahnfels there is an observation point, the Frankenthaler Hut. This simple, wooden refuge hut was erected in 1906 by the Frankenthal branch of the Palatine Forest Club and offers shelter to hikers in inclement weather.

During the Cold War there was a US Forces radio relay site and a telephone call forwarding facility for the DSN network on the southern side of the summit. The tarmac road to the summit dates to this period and ends today at an enclosed and privately owned forest clearing in which the ruins of the military installation are still recognisable.

== Transport ==
The Rahnfelsen may be accessed either on a scenic, country walk(Waymark: red dot) or via the L518 state road, which starts at the southern edge of Leistadt at a roundabout. At kilometre 7 a tarmac lane branches off to the left on a right-hand bend. After about 1.5 km the summit plateau is reached.
