= Alsenborn =

Village in Germany

- Ortsteil of Enkenbach-Alsenborn
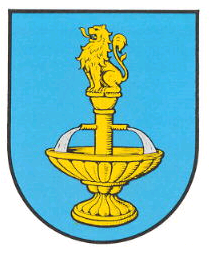
- Coat of arms
- Interactive map of Alsenborn
- Location within Germany Location within Rhineland-Palatinate
- Coordinates: 49°29′12″N 7°54′12″E
- Country: Germany
- State: Rhineland-Palatinate
- District: Kaiserslautern
- Municipality: Enkenbach-Alsenborn

Area
  - Total: 11.6 km^{2} (4.5 sq mi)
- Elevation: 292–406 m (958–1,332 ft)

Population (2007)
  - Total: 2,743
  - Density: 236/km^{2} (612/sq mi)
- Time zone: UTC+01:00 (CET)
  - Summer (DST): UTC+02:00 (CEST)
- Postal codes: 67677
- Dialling codes: 06303

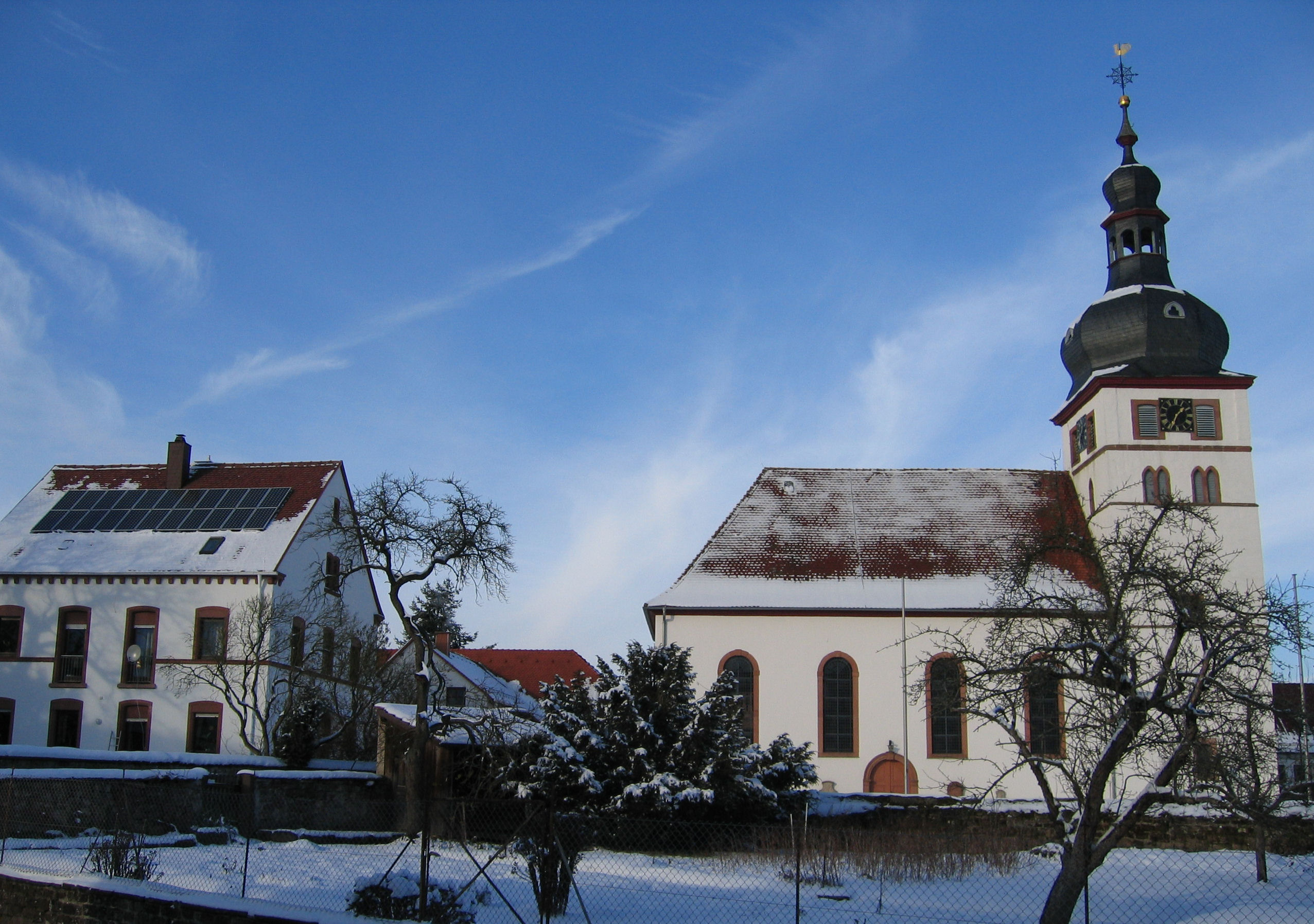
The Protestant Church and vicarage

Alsenborn (German pronunciation: [ˈalzn̩bɔʁn]) is a village forming part of the municipality of Enkenbach-Alsenborn within the district of Kaiserslautern in the German state of Rhineland-Palatinate. It has a population of 2,750. Until 1969 Alsenborn was an independent parish before merging with Enkenbach under the administrative reforms in the state. Alsenborn is known country-wide for its circus troupes, the football team of SV Alsenborn, which competed for promotion to the premier league in 1970, and as the home town of Fritz Walter, the 1954 captain of the German Football Team and World Cup champions.

== Geography and Geology ==
Alsenborn lies 12 kilometres northeast of the city of Kaiserslautern, by the Stumpfwald, a part of the Palatine Forest.

Alsenborn developed as a Haufendorf within the Alsenborn Basin and has grown westwards to merge with the neighbouring village of Enkenbach. Its residential areas have developed predominantly along the road through the valley.

== Literature ==
- Gemeindeverwaltung Enkenbach-Alsenborn, Alsenborn 872–1972. Beiträge zu einer Ortsgeschichte (in German), Kaiserslautern: Heimatstelle Pfalz
- Gisela Grasmück (1993), Artisten in Alsenborn. Von Mitbürgern und Außenseitern. Sozialhistorische Mikroanalyse einer mobilen Bevölkerungsgruppe. Studien zur Volkskultur in Rheinland-Pfalz. im Auftrag der Gesellschaft für Volkskunde in Rheinland-Pfalz (in German), Mainz
- Jo van Alsen (1991), Das Alsenborner Waldmensch. 1. Blatt Collage aus Archivbildern 1920–1930 – Geschichten aus Alsenborn in den "goldenen Zwanzigern" (in German), ISBN 3929024004
- Jo van Alsen (1991), Silberstreifen am Himmel. 1. Blatt Collage aus Archivbildern und Zeichnungen 1939–50. Tagebücher der Kriegsjahre 1944/45. Aufgezeichnet und betreffend Alsenborn/Pfalz, 1946 und danach (in German), CDV, Computer-Dr.-Verlag, ISBN 3929024012
- Fritz Walter (2001), Alsenborn – Aufstieg einer Dorfmannschaft (in German), Norderstedt, ISBN 3831118469
