= Sembach =

- Municipality
- The Center of Sembach

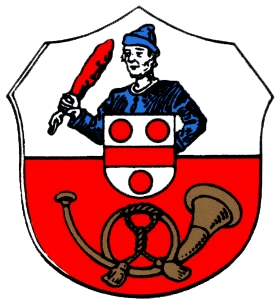
- Coat of arms

- Location of Sembach within Kaiserslautern district
- Interactive map of Sembach
- Location within Germany Location within Rhineland-Palatinate
- Coordinates: 49°30′49″N 07°51′38″E
- Country: Germany
- State: Rhineland-Palatinate
- District: Kaiserslautern
- Municipal assoc.: Enkenbach-Alsenborn

Government
  - Mayor (2019–24): Fritz Hack (SPD)

Area
  - Total: 5.5 km^{2} (2.1 sq mi)
- Elevation: 261 m (856 ft)

Population (2025-12-31)
  - Total: 1,139
  - Density: 210/km^{2} (540/sq mi)
- Time zone: UTC+01:00 (CET)
  - Summer (DST): UTC+02:00 (CEST)
- Postal codes: 67681
- Dialling codes: 06303
- Vehicle registration: KL
- Website: www.sembach-online.de

Sembach (German pronunciation: [ˈzɛmbax]) is a municipality in the district of Kaiserslautern in the state of Rhineland-Palatinate, Germany. It forms part of the Verbandsgemeinde of Enkenbach-Alsenborn. The town is nestled in the Palatinate Forest Nature Park between Kaiserslautern and Donnersbergkreis. Sembach was first mentioned in the 13th century, in a document about a donation to the monastery of Enkenbach.

== History ==
The village was first mentioned in a document in the 13th century on the occasion of a donation to the Enkenbach monastery. Before the French Revolution, the village belonged to the Kolb von Wartenberg family. At the end of the 18th century, Sembach was occupied by France and was part of the French Republic (until 1804) and then part of the Napoleonic Empire. During this time, Sembach was incorporated into the canton of Winnweiler.

The municipality benefited from the construction of Napoleon's imperial road from Paris to Mainz, which placed the town on a supra-regional transport route and made it a post station in 1809. As a result of the resolutions passed at the Congress of Vienna in 1815, Sembach first became part of Austria and a year later the Rhine district in the Kingdom of Bavaria, which later became the Palatinate. From 1818 to 1862, Sembach belonged to the Kaiserslautern district commissariat, from which the Kaiserslautern district office emerged. On December 1, 1900, the municipality moved to the newly created district office of Rockenhausen.

From 1939, the town was part of the district of Rockenhausen. After the Second World War, Sembach became part of the newly formed state of Rhineland-Palatinate within the French occupation zone, ending its affiliation with Bavaria. In the course of the first Rhineland-Palatinate administrative reform, the town was transferred to the newly created Donnersberg district. Another change of district took place on April 22, 1972; since then, the municipality has been part of the district of Kaiserslautern. In the same year, it was incorporated into the municipality of Enkenbach-Alsenborn, which existed in this form until 2014.

== Geography ==
The municipality is located on the edge of the Palatinate Forest Nature Park just under ten kilometers north-east of the city of Kaiserslautern in the Lower Palatinate Forest in the north-east of the Kaiserslautern district, directly on the border with the Donnersberg district. The area in the municipality's catchment area is known as the Sembacher Platten and is unwooded. The Nordpfälzer Bergland is located immediately to the north. The Lohnsbach stream touches the western edge of the settlement area. The Alsenz runs for a few hundred meters across the north-east of the district; in this area it takes in the Stinkentalbach from the left. Neighboring municipalities are - clockwise - Wartenberg-Rohrbach, Münchweiler an der Alsenz, Gonbach, Neuhemsbach, Enkenbach-Alsenborn, Mehlingen and Otterberg.

== Religion ==
On October 31, 2014, 44.61 percent of the population was Protestant and 23.58 percent Catholic. The remainder belonged to another religion or were non-denominational[2].

There have been Mennonites in Sembach since the 17th century. In 1960, the Sembach community had around 280 members,[3] currently there are around 158 members.[4] The Jews who once lived in the village were buried in Mehlingen.

== Politics ==
=== Municipal council ===
The municipal council of Sembach has 17 members, including the mayor Peter Beutler (FWG).

	SPD	CDU	FWG	Total
2024	3	3	10	16 seats

(Dated: elections June 9, 2024)

=== Sembach By Car ===
- The Bundesstraße 40 runs through the edge of the town. The Bundesautobahn 63 (Kaiserslautern- Mainz) exit Sembach, is 1 km from the middle of Sembach. Frankfurt is 107 km north from Sembach, and downtown Kaiserslautern (Stadtmitte) is about 8 km away.

=== American military influence ===
Headquarters of 17th Air Force from October 1972 until September 30, 1996. Dependent schooling from Kindergarten to 3rd grade is in Sembach Elementary School and grades 4th-9th in Sembach Middle School. Many other buildings consist of Sembach Annex accomplishing a variety of missions for the United States Air Force. Sembach Airbase was shut down in 1996 with the runway shutting down and the remainder of Sembach AB being transferred to its current status as an annex of Ramstein Air Base. The former runway has been mostly dismantled except for a small stretch at the eastern end with the remainder of the former facility now being an industrial park. An article dated 26 January 2010 in the Stars & Stripes stated the facility would be turned over to the U.S. Army by the end of fiscal year 2010 (30 Sep 2010)
