= Karl Bischoff =

German architect, engineer and SS-Sturmbannführer

Karl Bischoff

Karl Bischoff (9 August 1897 – 2 October 1950) was a German architect, engineer and SS-Sturmbannführer. He served at Auschwitz as chief of the Central Construction Office of the Waffen-SS. While there he was chief of construction of the Auschwitz II-Birkenau camp.

== Biography ==
Born in Neuhemsbach near Kaiserslautern, Germany. At the age of twenty, he joined the Luftwaffe. In 1935 he obtained a job at the Luftwaffe Construction Bureau. During the early years of the Second World War, he was involved in the building of air bases in France. In this position he met SS-Gruppenführer Hans Kammler, who was responsible for the SS-Amt II (Building), which later became Amtsgruppe C of the WVHA. Kammler offered Bischoff a leading post at Auschwitz.

In October 1941 Bischoff arrived in Auschwitz, where he became chief of the Central Construction Office of the Waffen-SS and the Police Auschwitz in Upper Silesia (for i. Zentralbauleitung der Waffen SS und Polizei, Auschwitz O/S) that had to implement the planned enlargement of the concentration camp by the creation of a POW camp, which itself later became part of the Auschwitz II-Birkenau camp. He showed his ambition shortly after his arrival by claiming the enormous budget of 20 million Reichsmarks. Unlike his predecessor, Bischoff was an extremely competent and dynamic bureaucrat. Despite all of the difficulties caused by the war, the building activities deemed necessary during the next years were all carried out by Bischoff and his staff. The giant Birkenau camp, the four big crematoria, the technically complicated central sauna, the new reception building in the Stammlager and hundreds of other buildings, were planned and realized. For instance, Bischoff laid out the construction plans for the building of Auschwitz II-Birkenau with an original tally of 550 prisoners in each barrack (this meant that each prisoner had one-third the amount of space that he or she was allotted in other Nazi German concentration camps). He changed this tally to 744 prisoners per barrack. The SS designed the barracks not so much to house people as to destroy them.

In 1943 the chief builder of the crematoria was able to inform his superiors in Berlin about the success of the operation: when the old crematorium in the Stammlager was included, 4,756 persons could be burned within 24 hours in five crematoria. In 1944, Bischoff was awarded the War Merit Cross, 1st class, but shortly afterward he was informed that further plans for Auschwitz had to be reduced to those facilities considered absolutely necessary. The faltering German position at the Eastern Front did not favour further development in the area.

In April 1944 he left Auschwitz and became chief of the building bureau of the Waffen-SS in Silesia and Bohemia at Katowice. He remained there until the end of the war. Although almost all of the archives of the Auschwitz building office fell into the hands of the Soviets after the camp was liberated by the Red Army in January 1945, Bischoff remained in the shadows after the war ended. His involvement at Auschwitz went unrecognized until his death in Bremen in 1950.
