= Enkenbach-Alsenborn =

- Municipality
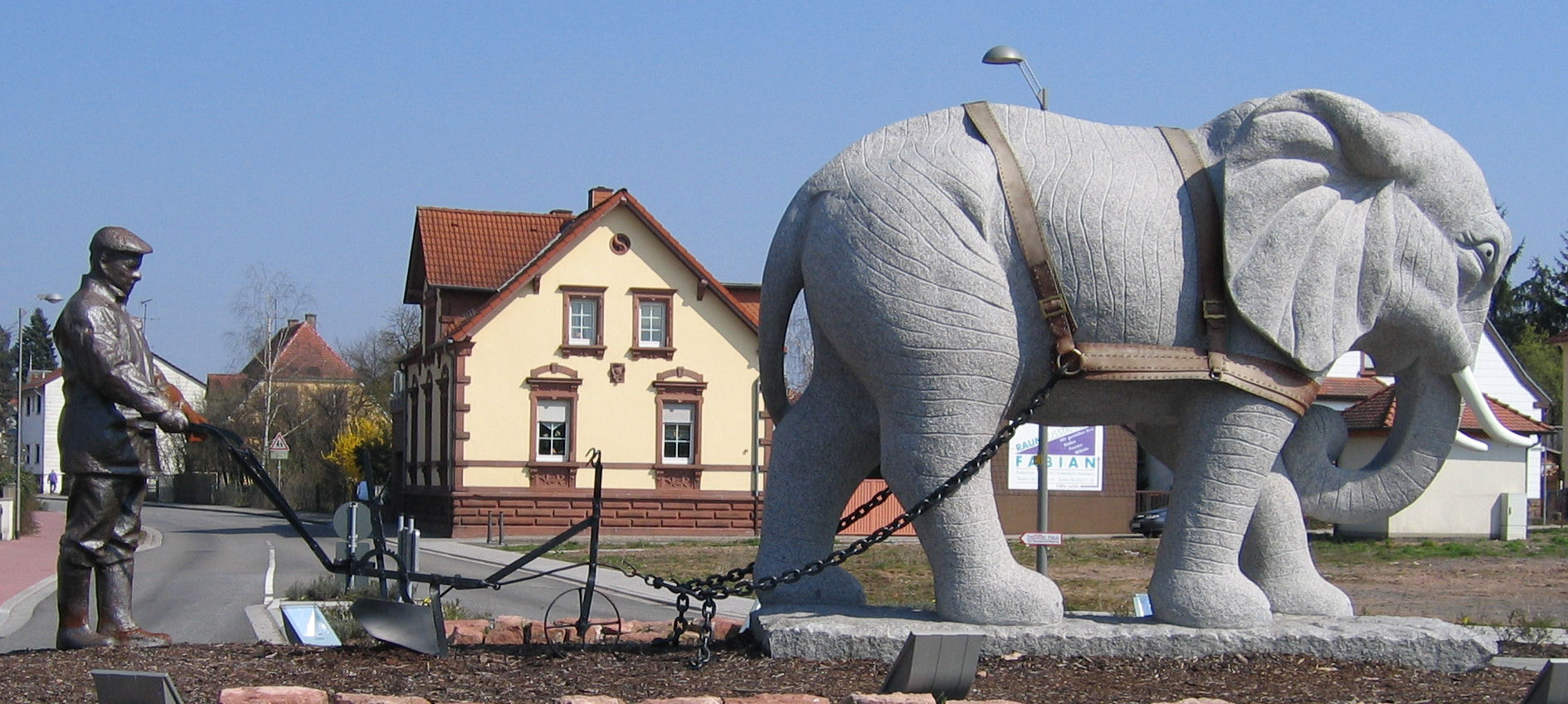

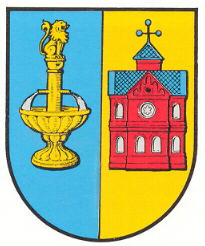
- Coat of arms

- Location of Enkenbach-Alsenborn within Kaiserslautern district
- Interactive map of Enkenbach-Alsenborn
- Location within Germany Location within Rhineland-Palatinate
- Coordinates: 49°29′26″N 7°54′09″E
- Country: Germany
- State: Rhineland-Palatinate
- District: Kaiserslautern
- Municipal assoc.: Enkenbach-Alsenborn

Government
  - Mayor (2019–24): Jürgen Wenzel (CDU)

Area
  - Total: 30.06 km^{2} (11.61 sq mi)
- Elevation: 289 m (948 ft)

Population (2025-12-31)
  - Total: 7,231
  - Density: 240.6/km^{2} (623.0/sq mi)
- Time zone: UTC+01:00 (CET)
  - Summer (DST): UTC+02:00 (CEST)
- Postal codes: 67677
- Dialling codes: 06303
- Vehicle registration: KL
- Website: www.enkenbach-alsenborn.de

Enkenbach-Alsenborn (German pronunciation: [ˈɛŋkn̩bax ˈʔalzn̩bɔʁn]) is a municipality in the district of Kaiserslautern, in Rhineland-Palatinate, Germany. It is situated on the northern edge of the Palatinate Forest, approx. 10 km north-east of Kaiserslautern. Enkenbach-Alsenborn is also the seat of the Verbandsgemeinde ("collective municipality"), also named Enkenbach-Alsenborn.

== Geography ==
The municipality consists of the local villages of Enkenbach and Alsenborn. Before officially combining on 7 June 1969, the two villages worked very closely throughout their history to include a common coat of arms until 1795, a common mayor until 1825 and a common forest area until 1832.

Neighbouring municipalities are - in a clockwise direction - Neuhemsbach, Sippersfeld, Kerzenheim, Ramsen (Pfalz), Wattenheim, Fischbach (Kaiserslautern district), Kaiserslautern and Mehlingen.

== History ==
The area immediately surrounding Enkenbach-Alsenborn contains a high number of Celtic burial mounds from prehistoric times.

=== Expansion ===
With favorable traffic levels and the connection to the railway in the year 1871 with the opening of Enkenbach station on the Alsenz Valley Railway, as well as the establishment of industry in the Kaiserslautern area, led to the total population of the municipality increasing despite strong emigration out of present-day Germany. Due to this population increase, Enkenbach-Alsenborn evolved from a farming community to the municipality it is today.

=== Population ===
- 1800: 1,095
- 1900: 3,326
- 1975: 6,900
- 1996: 7,323
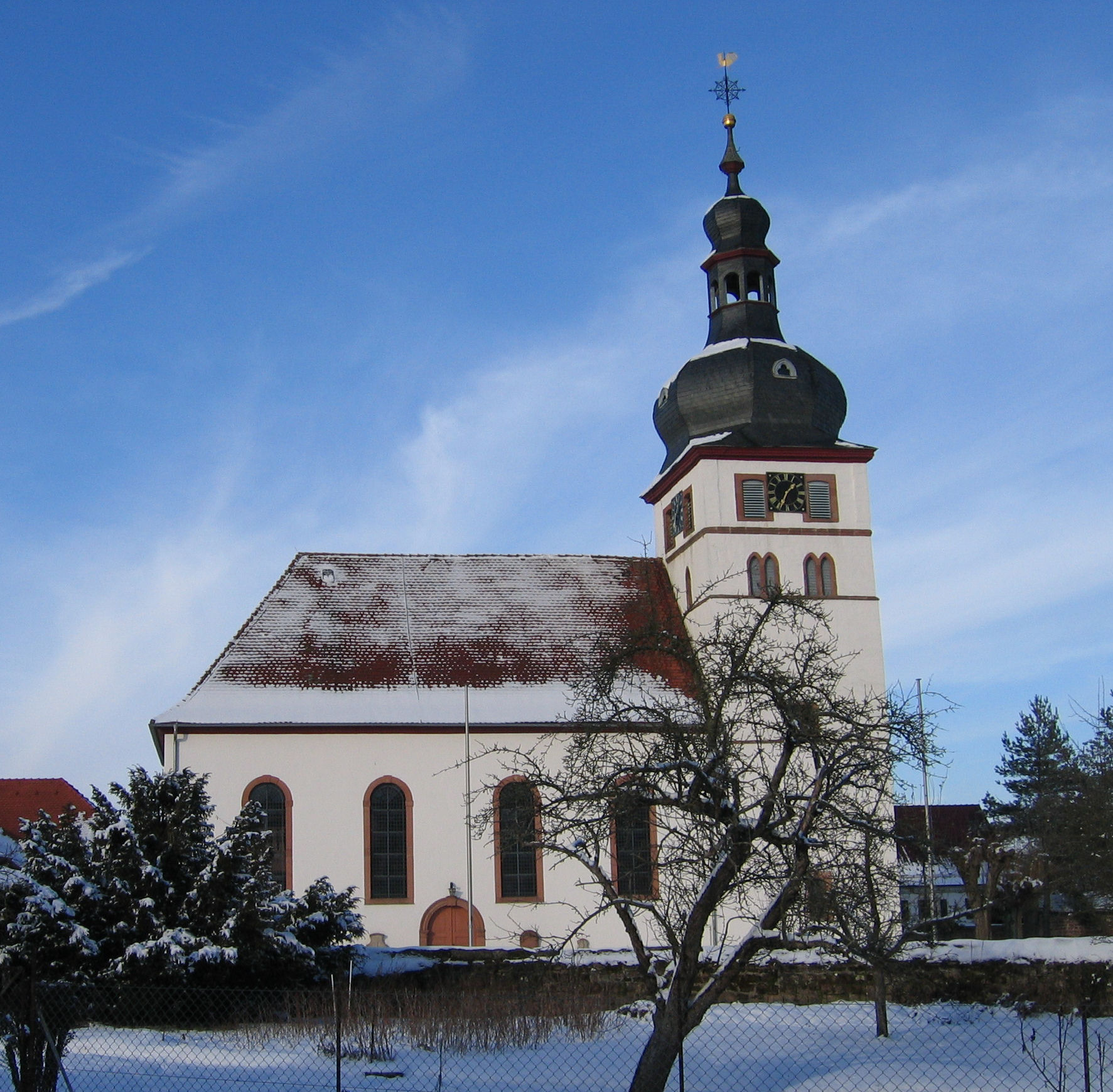
Alsenborn

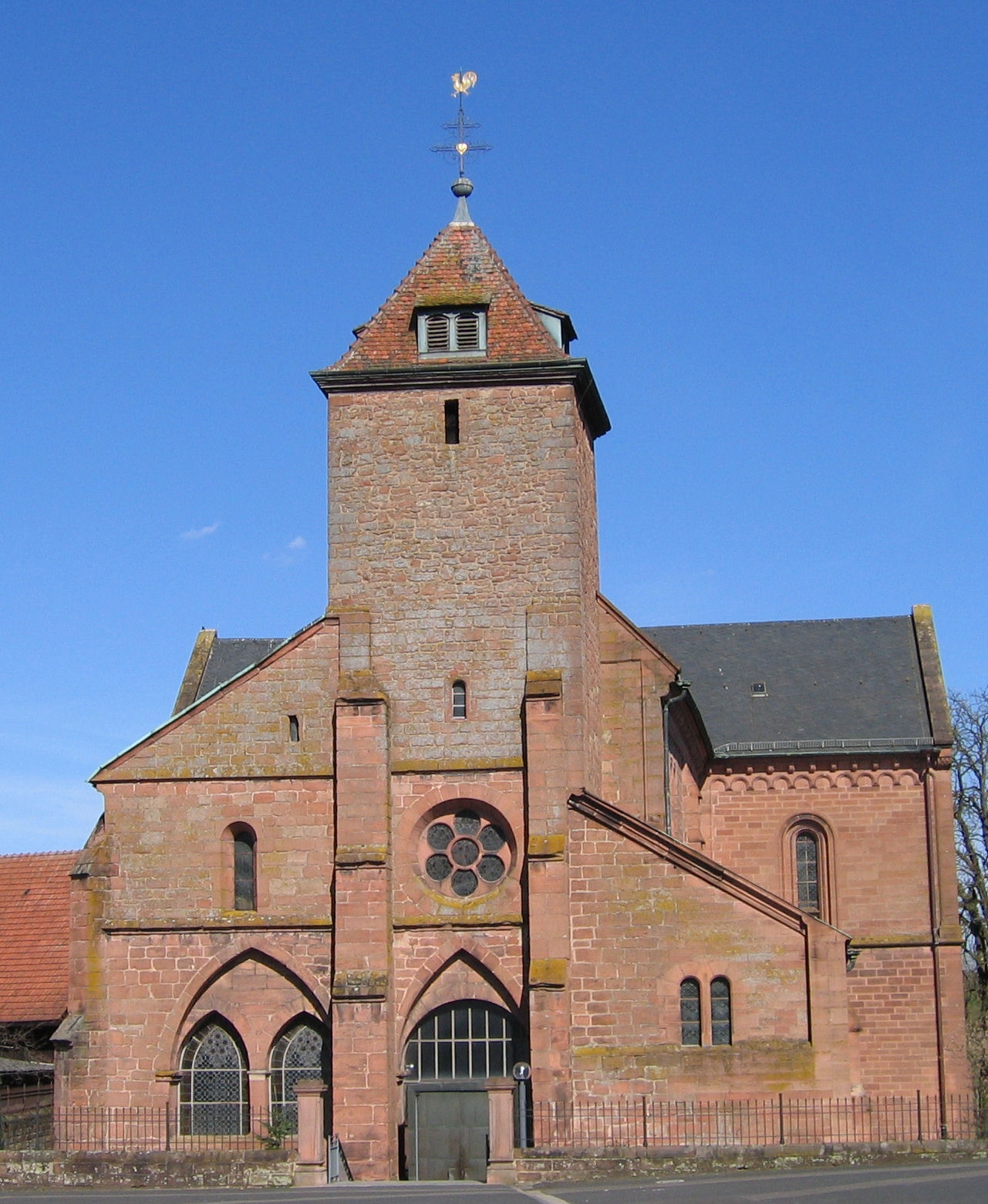
Enkenbach

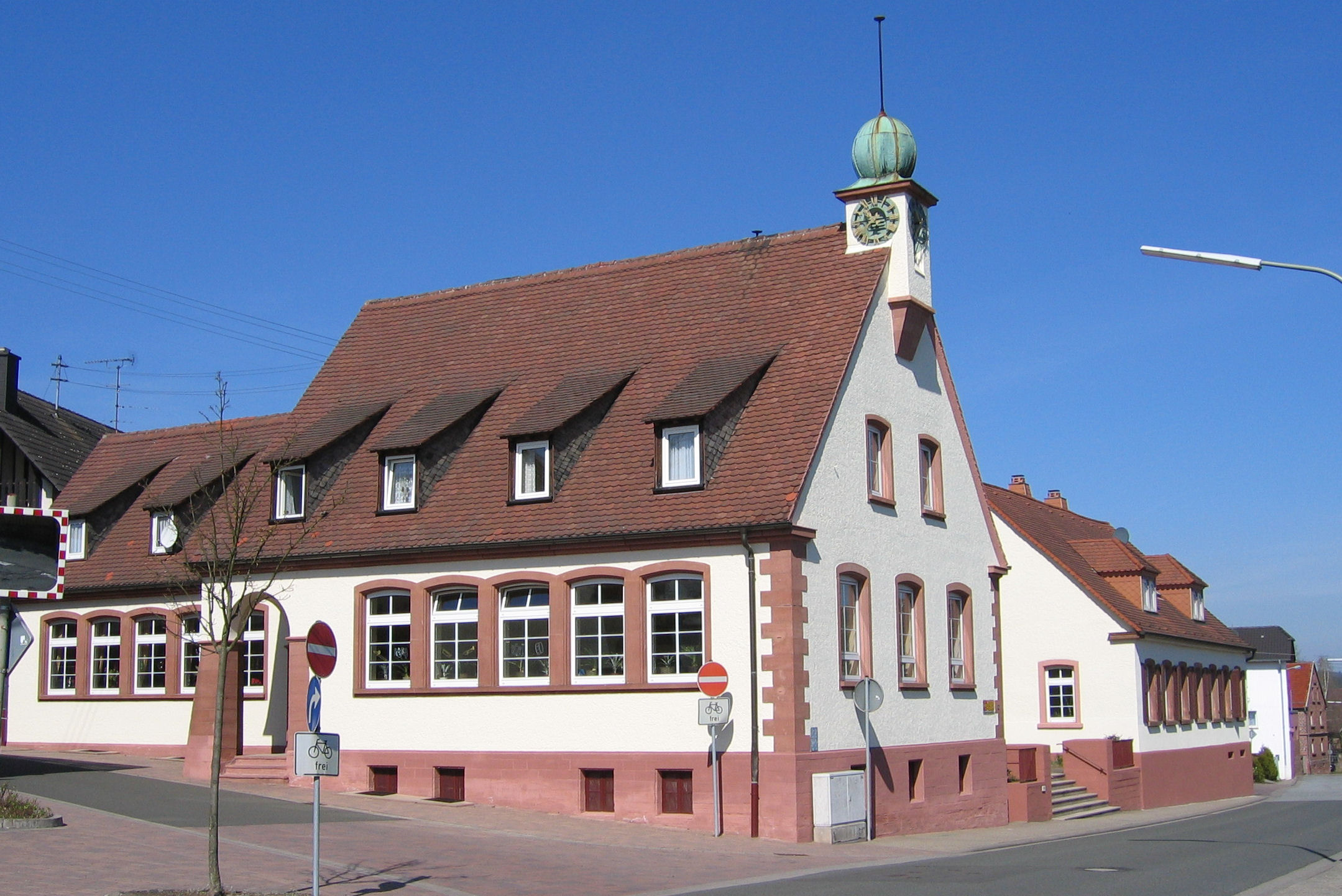
Mehlingen

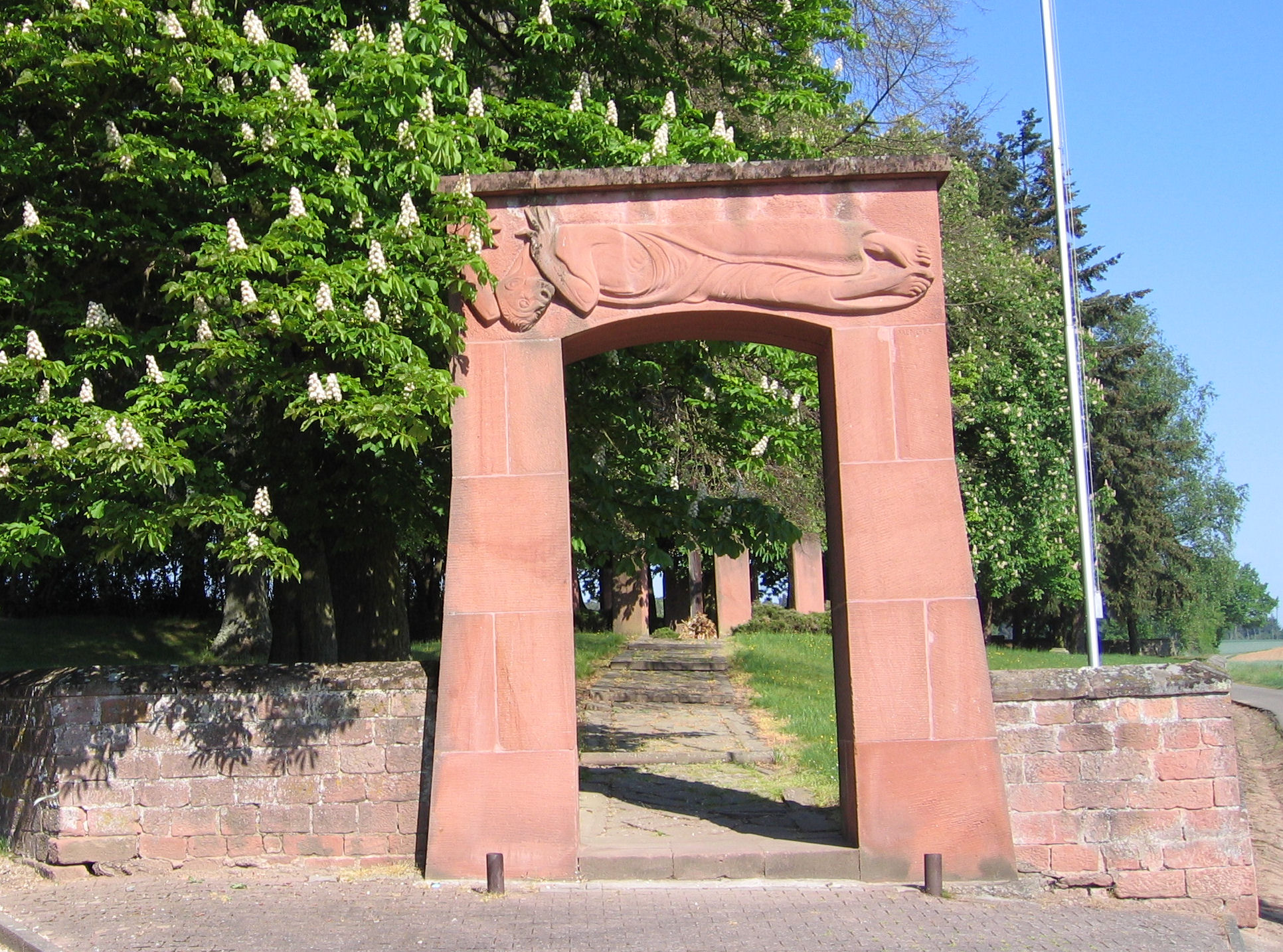
Baalborn

=== Notable people ===
- Wilhelm Mayerr (1874-1923), politician (CENTER, BVP)
- Wilhelm Müller (1890-1957), politician (KPD)
