= Haufendorf =

Type of German village

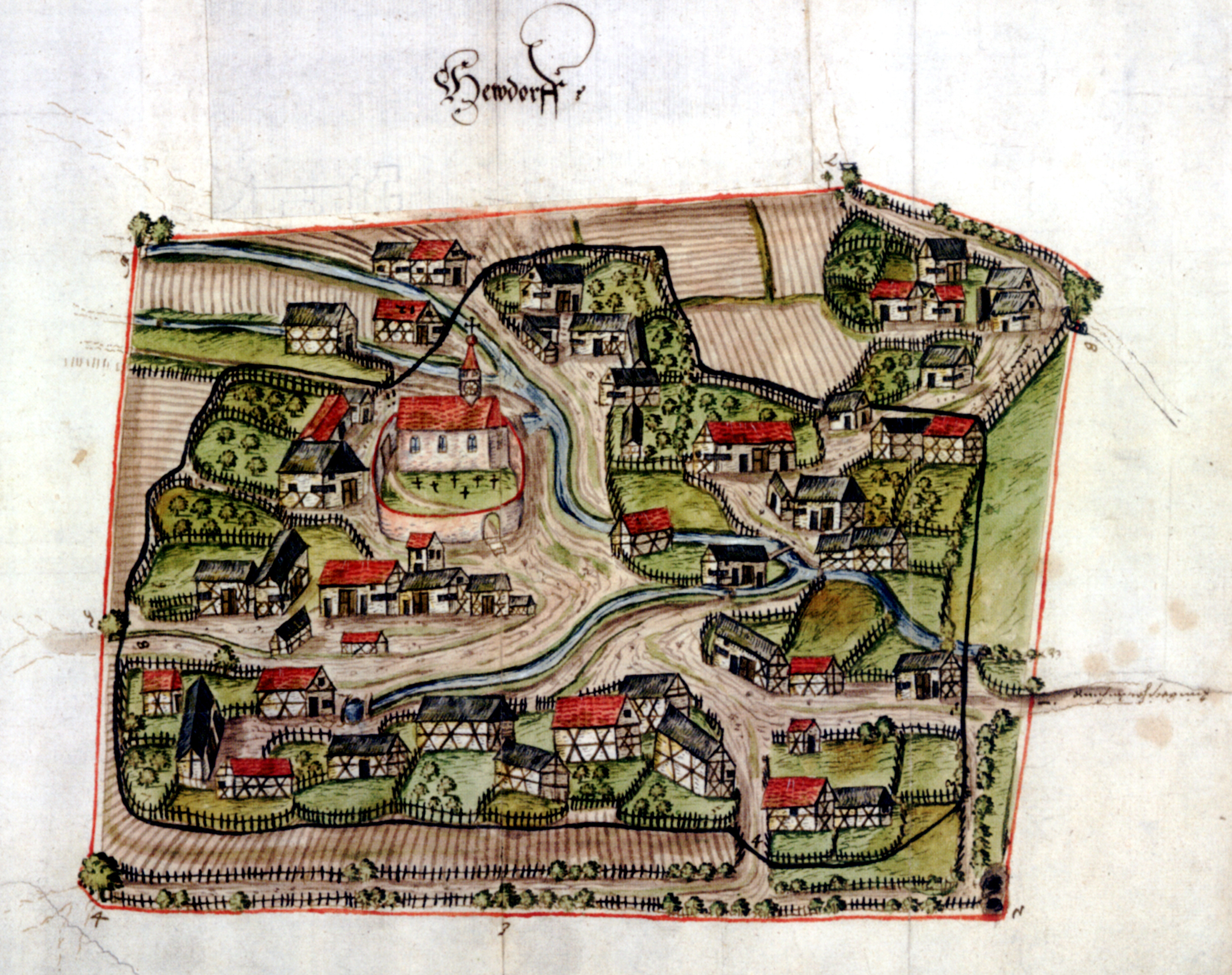
The Haufendorf of Heudorf bei Meßkirch around 1575

A Haufendorf (German pronunciation: [ˈhaʊfn̩ˌdɔʁf]) is an enclosed village with irregular plots of land and farms of greatly differing scale, usually surrounded by a stockade fence (German: Ortsetter). They are typically found in Germany, Austria and Switzerland. Haufendörfer (pl.) differ from most other types of village in that they are irregularly laid out. A large number of Haufendörfer emerged in connection with the medieval open field system (Gewanneflur), where each farmer farmed strips of different fields and the location of these strips continually changed. The districts (Gemarkung) were divided into the village core (Dorfkern), field system (Ackerflur) and common pasture (Allmende).

A Haufendorf is sometimes also referred to as a "clustered village" or "irregularly nucleated village".
