= Neuhemsbach =

- Municipality
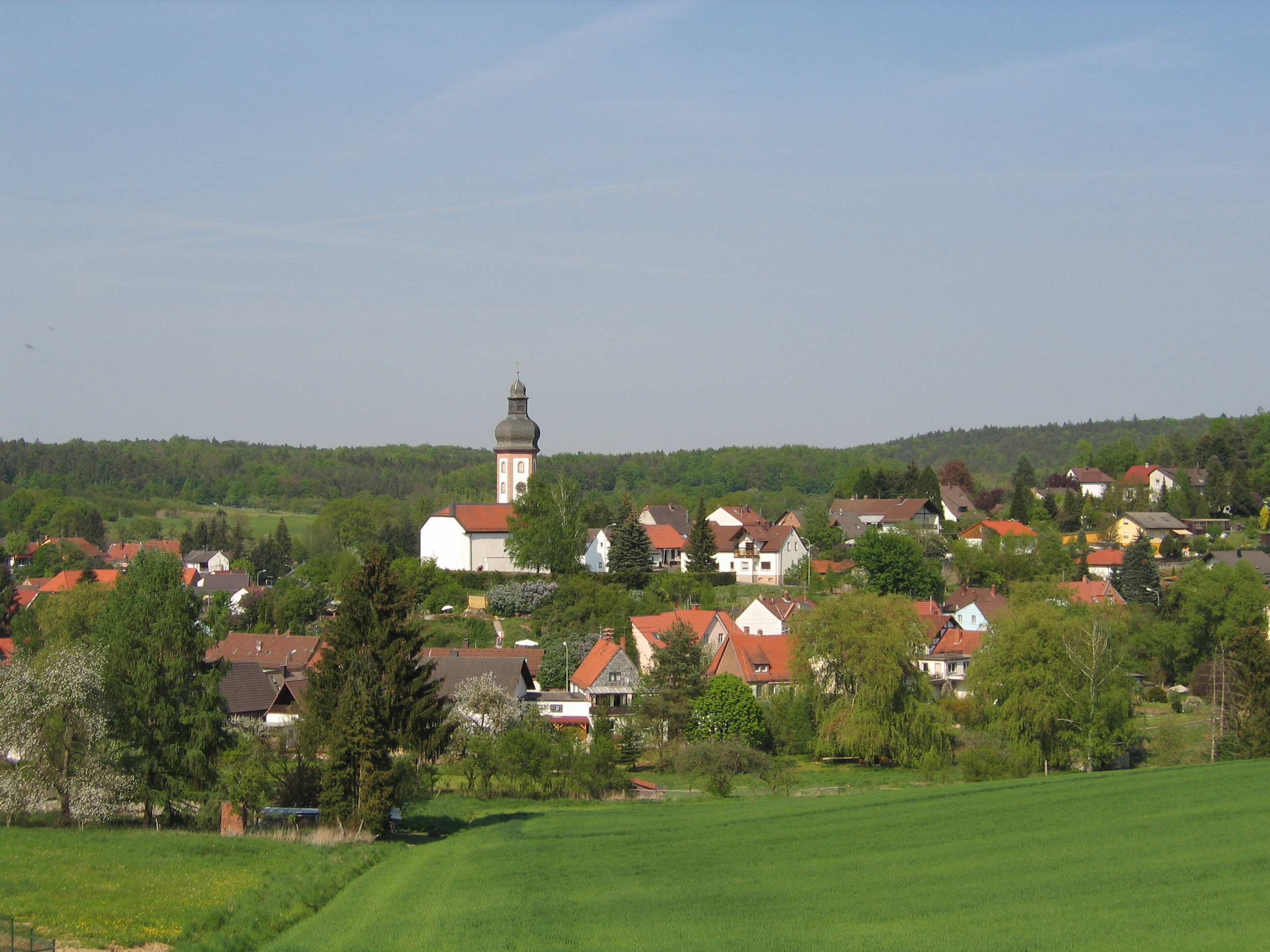
- Neuhemsbach

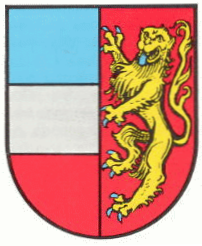
- Coat of arms

- Location of Neuhemsbach within Kaiserslautern district
- Interactive map of Neuhemsbach
- Location within Germany Location within Rhineland-Palatinate
- Coordinates: 49°31′23″N 7°55′31″E
- Country: Germany
- State: Rhineland-Palatinate
- District: Kaiserslautern
- Municipal assoc.: Enkenbach-Alsenborn

Government
  - Mayor (2019–24): Silke Brunck (SPD)

Area
  - Total: 6.66 km^{2} (2.57 sq mi)
- Elevation: 261 m (856 ft)

Population (2025-12-31)
  - Total: 959
  - Density: 144/km^{2} (373/sq mi)
- Time zone: UTC+01:00 (CET)
  - Summer (DST): UTC+02:00 (CEST)
- Postal codes: 67680
- Dialling codes: 06303
- Vehicle registration: KL
- Website: www.neuhemsbach.de

Neuhemsbach is a municipality in the district of Kaiserslautern, in Rhineland-Palatinate, western Germany.

== Known People ==
- Birthplace of Karl Bischoff.
