= Enkenbach-Alsenborn (Verbandsgemeinde) =

- Verbandsgemeinde
- Coat of arms

- Location of Enkenbach-Alsenborn within Kaiserslautern district
- Interactive map of Enkenbach-Alsenborn
- Location within Germany Location within Rhineland-Palatinate
- Coordinates: 49°29′26″N 7°54′09″E
- Country: Germany
- State: Rhineland-Palatinate
- District: Kaiserslautern
- Subdivisions: 8 municipalities

Government
  - Mayor (2022–30): Silke Brunck (SPD)

Area
  - Total: 142.39 km^{2} (54.98 sq mi)

Population (2025-12-31)
  - Total: 19,998
  - Density: 140.45/km^{2} (363.75/sq mi)
- Time zone: UTC+01:00 (CET)
  - Summer (DST): UTC+02:00 (CEST)
- Vehicle registration: KL
- Website: www.enkenbach-alsenborn.de

Enkenbach-Alsenborn is a Verbandsgemeinde ("collective municipality") in the district of Kaiserslautern, in Rhineland-Palatinate, Germany. Its seat is located in Enkenbach-Alsenborn. It consists of the following Ortsgemeinden ("local municipalities"):

1. Enkenbach-Alsenborn
2. Fischbach
3. Frankenstein
4. Hochspeyer
5. Mehlingen
6. Neuhemsbach
7. Sembach
8. Waldleiningen

Originally established on 7 June 1969 from the combination of the villages of Enkenbach and Alsenborn, it was expanded to include the villages of Sembach, Mehlingen and Neuhemsbach on 22 April 1972. On 1 July 2014 it was expanded with the 4 municipalities of the former Verbandsgemeinde Hochspeyer.
