= Waldleiningen =

- Municipality
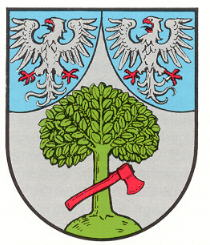
- Coat of arms

- Location of Waldleiningen within Kaiserslautern district
- Interactive map of Waldleiningen
- Location within Germany Location within Rhineland-Palatinate
- Coordinates: 49°23′52″N 7°53′12″E
- Country: Germany
- State: Rhineland-Palatinate
- District: Kaiserslautern
- Municipal assoc.: Enkenbach-Alsenborn

Government
  - Mayor (2019–24): Rainer Decker

Area
  - Total: 26.67 km^{2} (10.30 sq mi)
- Elevation: 290 m (950 ft)

Population (2025-12-31)
  - Total: 384
  - Density: 14.4/km^{2} (37.3/sq mi)
- Time zone: UTC+01:00 (CET)
  - Summer (DST): UTC+02:00 (CEST)
- Postal codes: 67693
- Dialling codes: 06305
- Vehicle registration: KL
- Website: www.waldleiningen.de

Waldleiningen is a municipality in the district of Kaiserslautern, in Rhineland-Palatinate, western Germany.
