= Hochspeyer =

- Municipality
- Coat of arms

- Location of Hochspeyer within Kaiserslautern district
- Interactive map of Hochspeyer
- Location within Germany Location within Rhineland-Palatinate
- Coordinates: 49°26′34″N 7°53′48″E
- Country: Germany
- State: Rhineland-Palatinate
- District: Kaiserslautern
- Municipal assoc.: Enkenbach-Alsenborn

Government
  - Mayor (2019–24): Dominic Jonas (CDU)

Area
  - Total: 22.74 km^{2} (8.78 sq mi)
- Elevation: 267 m (876 ft)

Population (2025-12-31)
  - Total: 4,700
  - Density: 210/km^{2} (540/sq mi)
- Time zone: UTC+01:00 (CET)
  - Summer (DST): UTC+02:00 (CEST)
- Postal codes: 67691
- Dialling codes: 06305
- Vehicle registration: KL
- Website: www.hochspeyer-pfalz.de

Hochspeyer (German pronunciation: [ˈhoːxˌʃpaɪɐ]) is a municipality in the district of Kaiserslautern, in Rhineland-Palatinate, Germany. It is situated in the Palatinate Forest (Pfälzer Wald), approx. 10 km east of Kaiserslautern.

Hochspeyer was the seat of the former Verbandsgemeinde Hochspeyer ("collective municipality").

== History ==
Hochspeyer's history is closely related to the Cistercian Abbey of Otterberg, to which the Münchhof belonged since 1195.

In 1801 the region Palatinate became part of the French Département Mont-Tonnerre, and in 1815 it became part of the Bavarian Kingdom.

After World War II Palatinate (and with it Hochspeyer) was incorporated in the federal state of Rhineland-Palatinate.

== Education ==
Hochspeyer has the Münchhofschule (a primary and secondary school) as well as three Kindergartens.

== Economy ==
Trade, minor industry and farming shape the small local economy in Hochspeyer. Tourism is about to develop since the Palatinate Forest has become part of the biosphere reserve Pfälzer Wald-Vosges du Nord in 1998 and projects like the Mountainbikepark Pfälzerwald, a route network for mountainbiking, have been initiated.

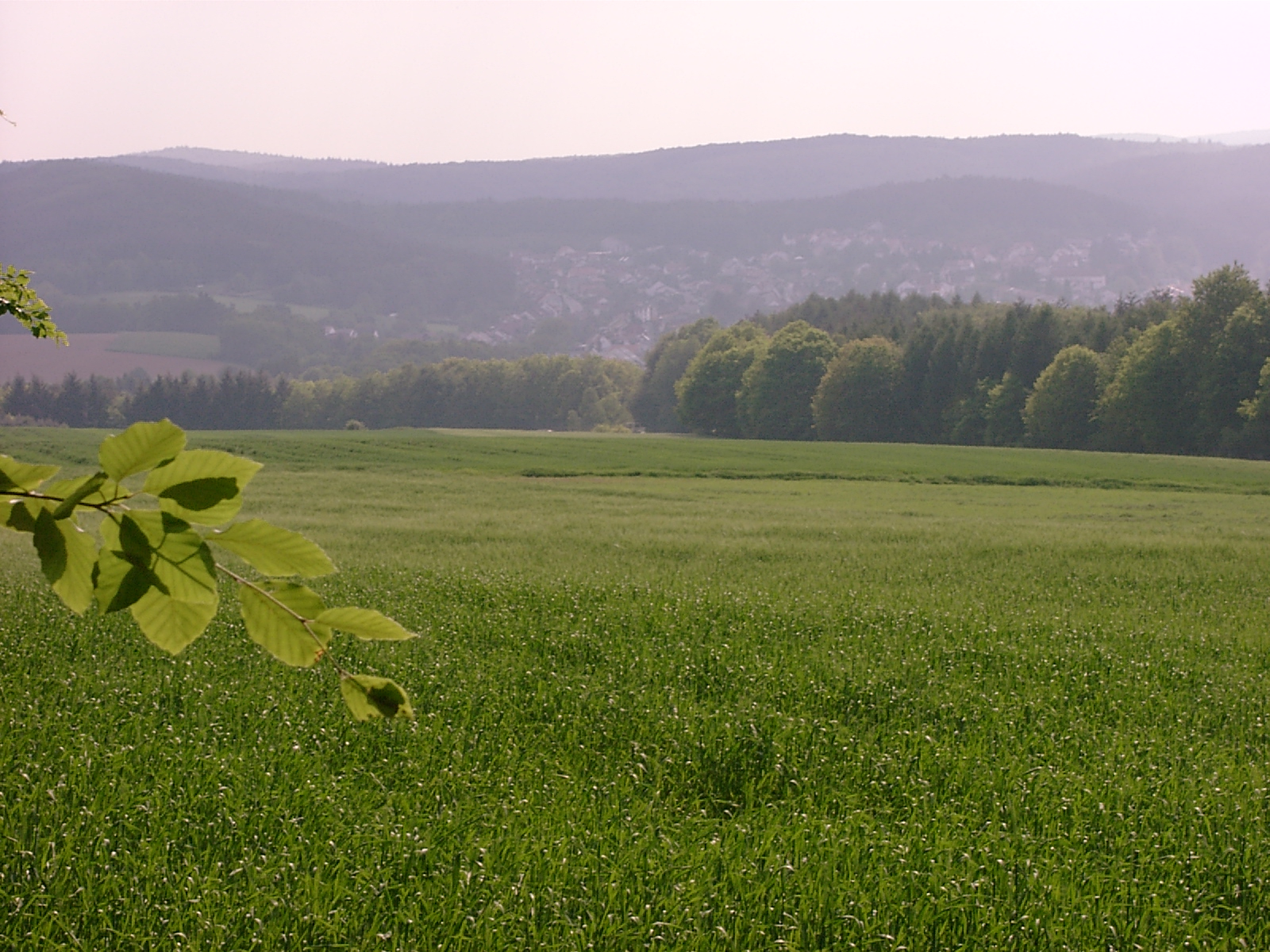
Farmland and forests form Hochspeyer's environment

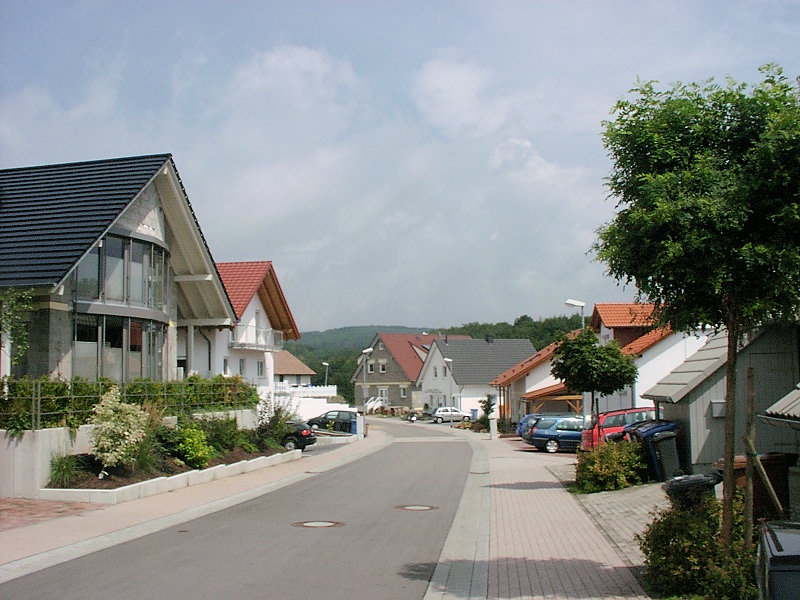
New development areas lead to a rise of population

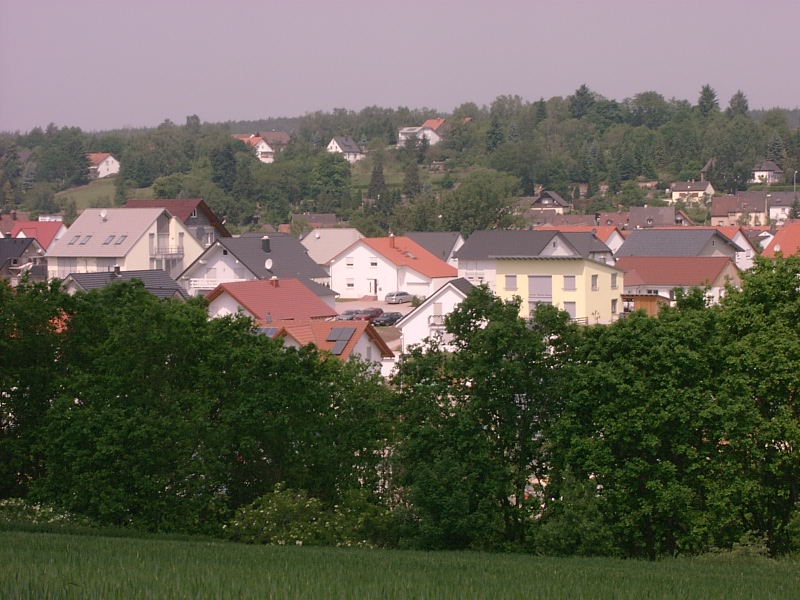
Good traffic infrastructure and the Palatine Forest attract tourists

== Transport ==
Hochspeyer is near the A6 and A63 motorways. It is also served by the B37 and B49 roads.

For rail, Hochspeyer is served by RheinNeckar S-Bahn trains on the Saarbrücken–Mannheim line between Kaiserslautern/Homburg and Mannheim/Heidelberg half-hourly.

== Climate ==
Climate in this area has mild differences between highs and lows, and there is adequate rainfall year-round. The Köppen Climate Classification subtype for this climate is "Cfb" (Marine West Coast Climate/Oceanic climate).

Climate data for Hochspeyer
Month	Jan	Feb	Mar	Apr	May	Jun	Jul	Aug	Sep	Oct	Nov	Dec	Year
Mean daily maximum °C (°F)	1 (33)	3 (37)	8 (46)	12 (53)	16 (60)	20 (68)	21 (69)	20 (68)	18 (64)	13 (55)	6 (42)	3 (37)	11 (51)
Mean daily minimum °C (°F)	−3 (26)	−2 (28)	0 (32)	3 (37)	6 (42)	10 (50)	12 (53)	11 (51)	9 (48)	5 (41)	1 (33)	0 (32)	4 (39)
Average precipitation mm (inches)	58 (2.3)	51 (2)	46 (1.8)	46 (1.8)	51 (2)	66 (2.6)	61 (2.4)	76 (3)	64 (2.5)	48 (1.9)	51 (2)	64 (2.5)	680 (26.8)
Source: Weatherbase

== Notable people ==
- Johannes Böhm (1890–1957), politician (SPD)
- Wilhelm Moschel (1896–1954), chemist
- Karl Ritter (1916–1994), politician (SPD)
- Hugo Ohliger (1920–1999), politician (CSU)
- Peter Schwarz (born 1953), football player
