= Palatine Forest Club =

Hiking club

Palatine Forest Club (Pfälzerwaldverein e.V.)
- Formation: • 27. November 1902 (Ludwigshafen branch) • 1903 (umbrella organisation)
- Purpose: walking club
- Headquarters: Neustadt an der Weinstrasse
- Members: ca. 30,000
- Chairman: Klaus Weichel
- Website: http://www.pwv.de/

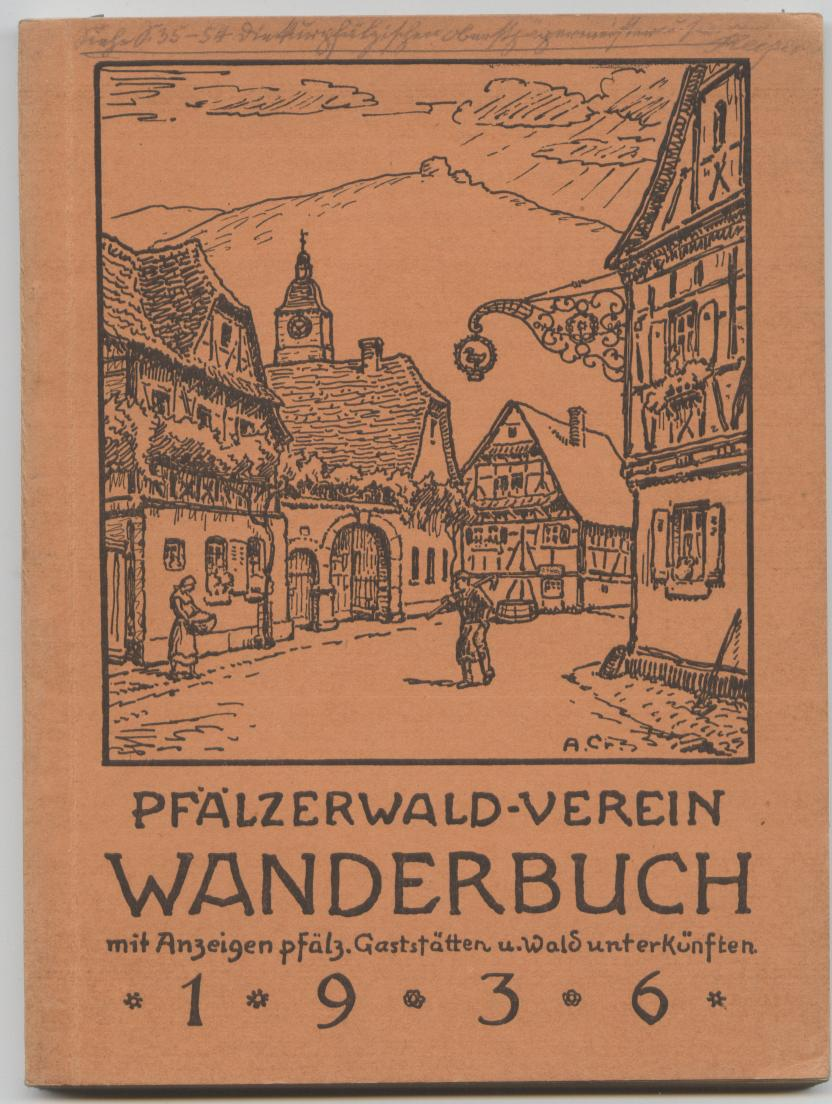
1936 walking guide, title page by August Croissant

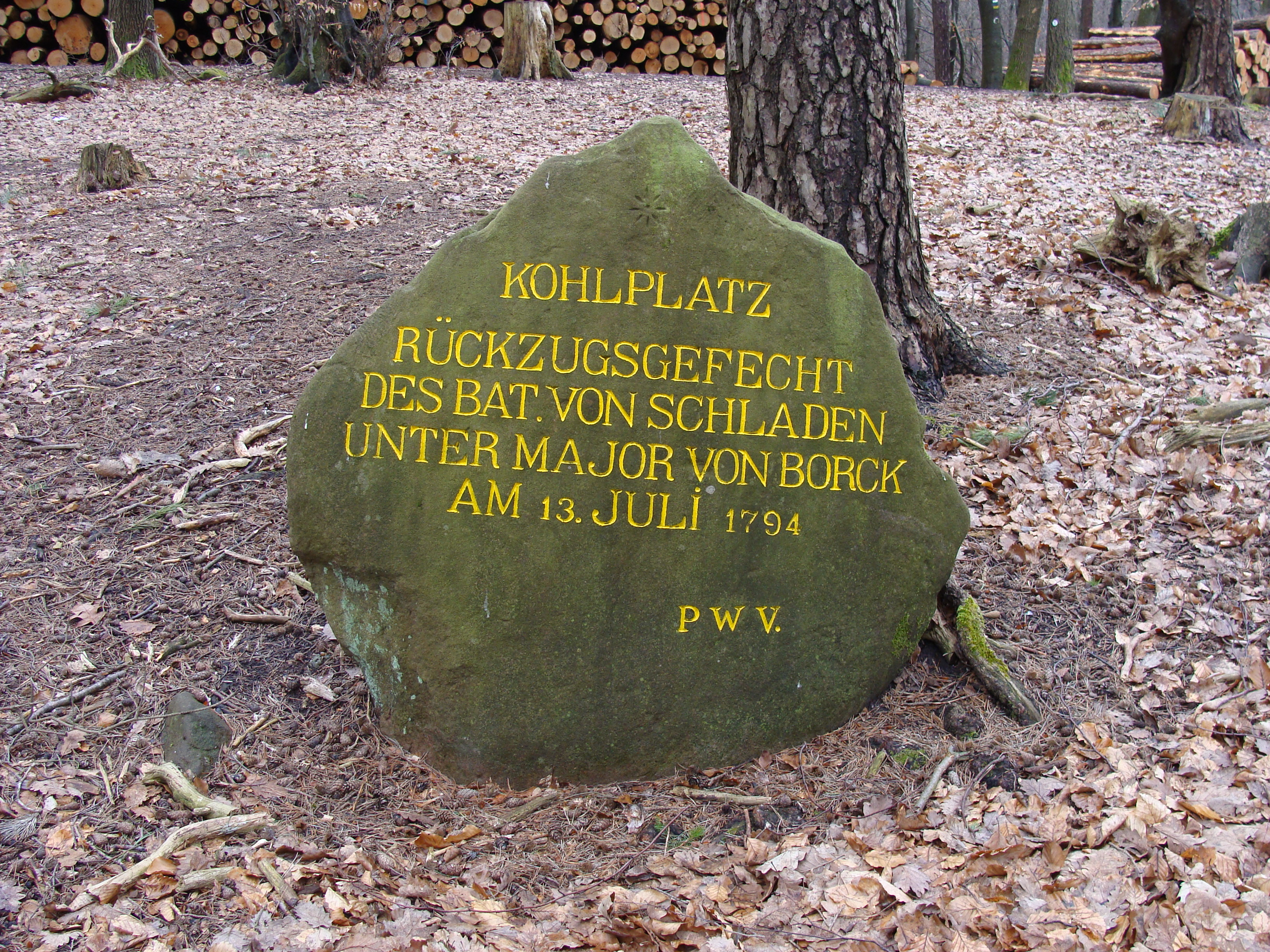
Ritterstein at the Kohlplatz near Edenkoben

The Palatine Forest Club (German: Pfälzerwald-Verein) is a hiking club in the former Bavarian Palatinate, i.e. the southern part of the German state of Rhineland-Palatinate and the Saarland county of Saarpfalz-Kreis. In 2011 it had 221 local branches with around 27,000 members.

The first branch was founded on 27 November 1902 in Ludwigshafen. Its first chairman was the industrialist, Anton Fasig. After other branches had formed the following year, the umbrella organization was founded in 1903. One of the founding members of the Palatine Forest Club, formed at the initiative of Ludwigshafen railway official, Otto Link, was the Palatine artist, Heinrich Strieffler. Karl Albrecht von Ritter was elected by the founding members as the managing director (Regierungsdirektor). Since 1908 the club has commemorated places of historical or natural significance by erecting and maintained a total of 306 so-called Ritter Stones (Rittersteine) - sandstone boulders with engraved inscriptions.

The head office of the Palatine Forest Club is in the town of Neustadt an der Weinstraße. its chairman since 2005 has been Klaus Weichel from Kaiserslautern, and its CEO since 1992 has been Bernd Wallner from Großfischlingen. The club has a 25-man board and 10 districts, maintaining a foundation that supports nature and monument conservation and is a member of the German Ramblers Association. The membership publication of the club since 1902 has been the quarterly magazine, Pfälzerwald. Its youth organisation is called the Deutsche Wanderjugend (DWJ).

The club maintains around 100 walking huts in the Palatinate and the Saarpfalz regions. Some are only managed at weekends, 17 are hostels with overnight accommodation for walking groups. One of the main tasks of the club, which is a recognized federal nature conservation organisation in Rhineland-Palatinate, is the signing of 12,000 km of walking routes in the Palatine Forest as well as organizing 10,000 annual walking and leisure events.
