= Ludwigswinkel =

- Municipality
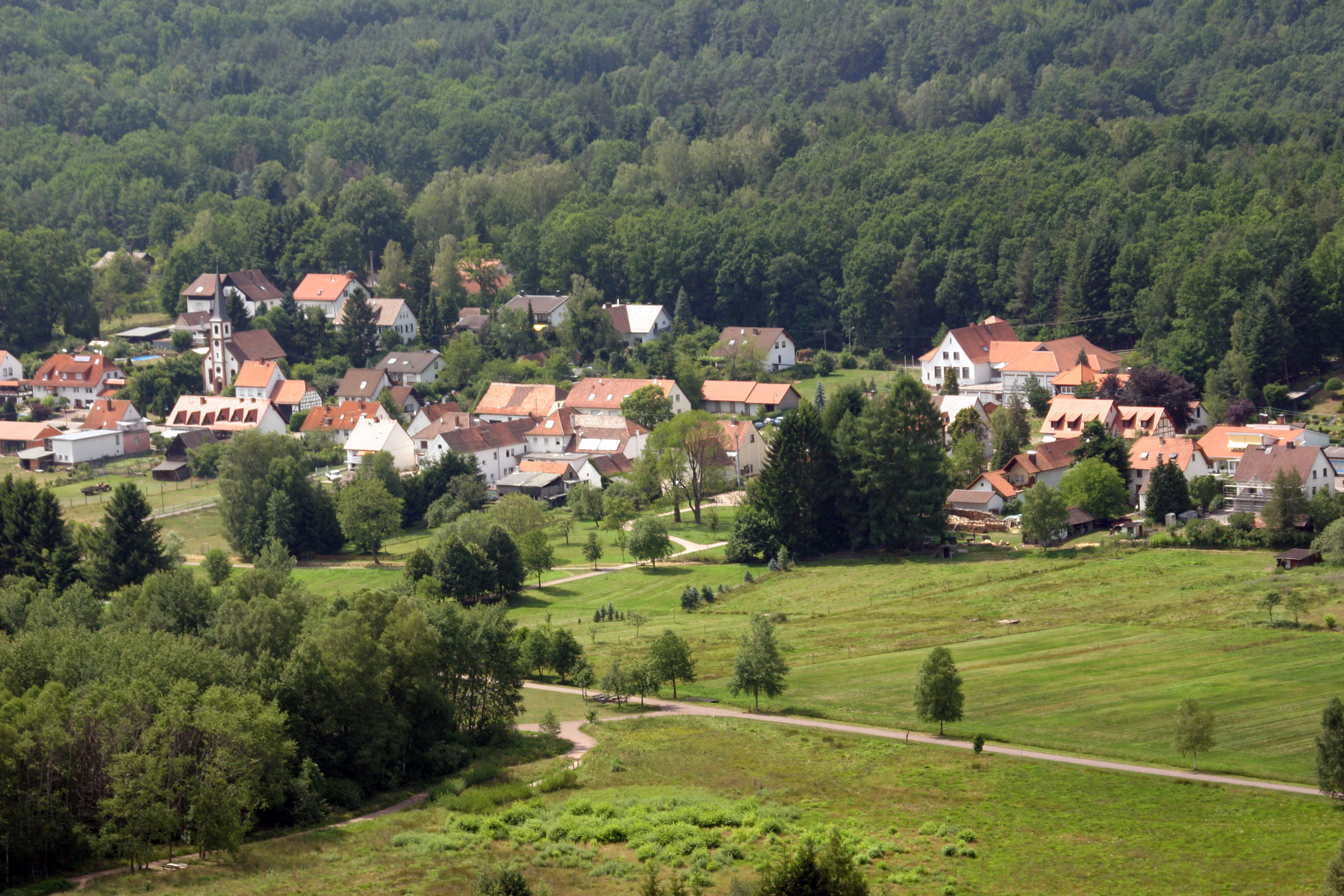

- Coat of arms

- Location of Ludwigswinkel within Pirmasens district
- Interactive map of Ludwigswinkel
- Location within Germany Location within Rhineland-Palatinate
- Coordinates: 49°05′00″N 7°40′00″E
- Country: Germany
- State: Rhineland-Palatinate
- District: Pirmasens
- Municipal assoc.: Dahner Felsenland

Government
  - Mayor (2019–24): Sebald Liesenfeld

Area
  - Total: 21.28 km^{2} (8.22 sq mi)
- Elevation: 240 m (790 ft)

Population (2025-12-31)
  - Total: 737
  - Density: 34.6/km^{2} (89.7/sq mi)
- Time zone: UTC+01:00 (CET)
  - Summer (DST): UTC+02:00 (CEST)
- Postal codes: 66996
- Dialling codes: 06393
- Vehicle registration: PS
- Website: www.ludwigswinkel.de

Ludwigswinkel (German pronunciation: [ˈluːtvɪçsˌvɪŋkl̩]) is a municipality in the district of Südwestpfalz of the German state of Rhineland-Palatinate, very close to the French border. The nearest large town is Pirmasens.
