= Mehlingen =

- Municipality
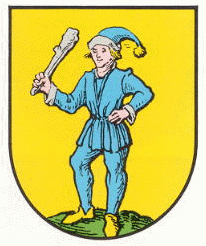
- Coat of arms

- Location of Mehlingen within Kaiserslautern district
- Interactive map of Mehlingen
- Location within Germany Location within Rhineland-Palatinate
- Coordinates: 49°29′31″N 7°51′15″E
- Country: Germany
- State: Rhineland-Palatinate
- District: Kaiserslautern
- Municipal assoc.: Enkenbach-Alsenborn
- Subdivisions: 4

Government
  - Mayor (2019–24): Monika Rettig (SPD)

Area
  - Total: 21.95 km^{2} (8.47 sq mi)
- Elevation: 289 m (948 ft)

Population (2025-12-31)
  - Total: 3,864
  - Density: 176.0/km^{2} (455.9/sq mi)
- Time zone: UTC+01:00 (CET)
  - Summer (DST): UTC+02:00 (CEST)
- Postal codes: 67678
- Dialling codes: 06303
- Vehicle registration: KL
- Website: www.mehlingen.de

Mehlingen (German pronunciation: [ˈmeːlɪŋən]) is a municipality in the district of Kaiserslautern, in Rhineland-Palatinate, western Germany.

It is located 5 km (3.1 mi) outside Kaiserslautern and has a population of just under 4,000.

The village is greatly influenced by the large number of Americans stationed in the area, often called the Kaiserslautern Military Community.
