= Fischbach, Kaiserslautern =

Fischbach
- Municipality
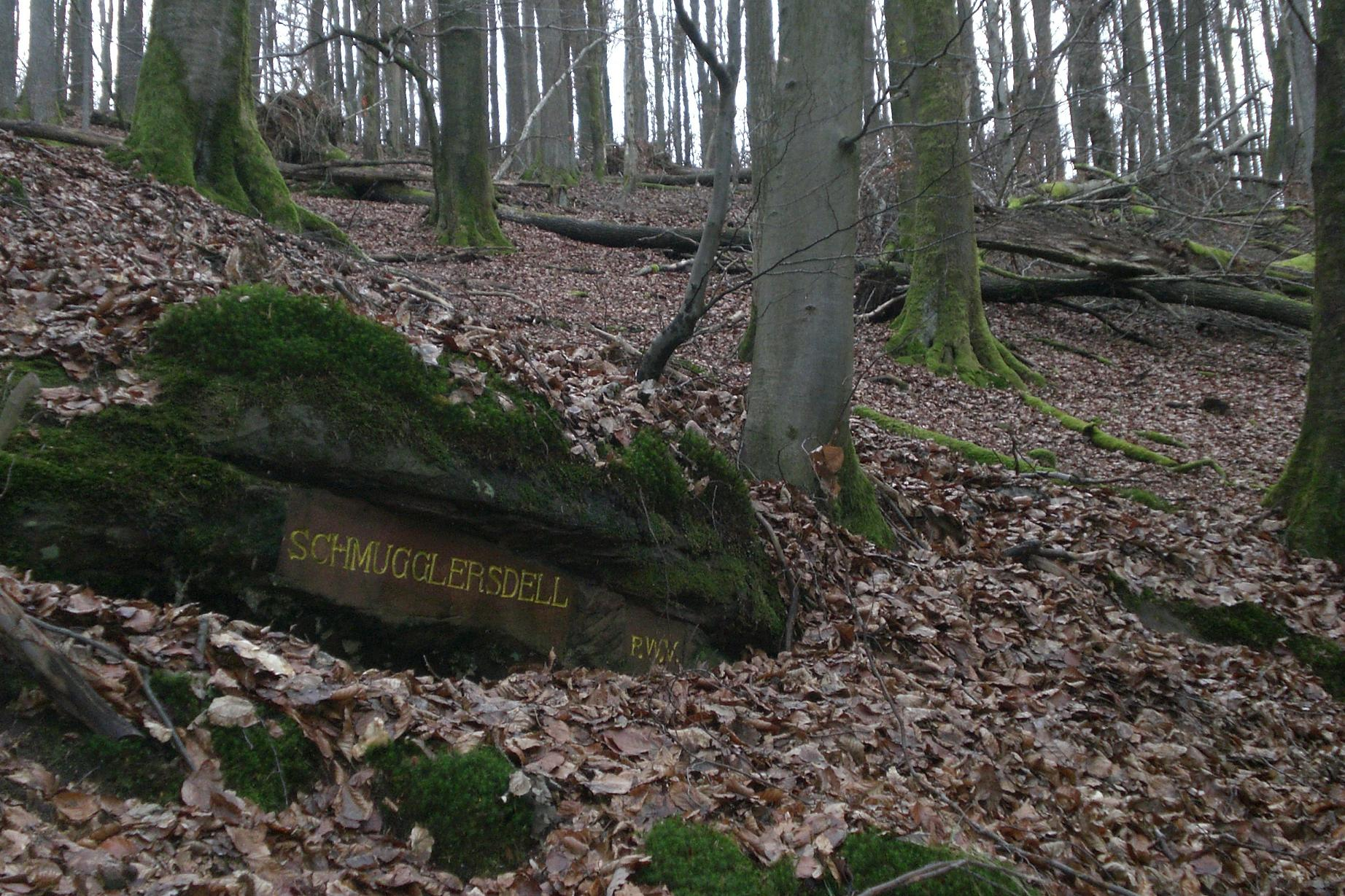

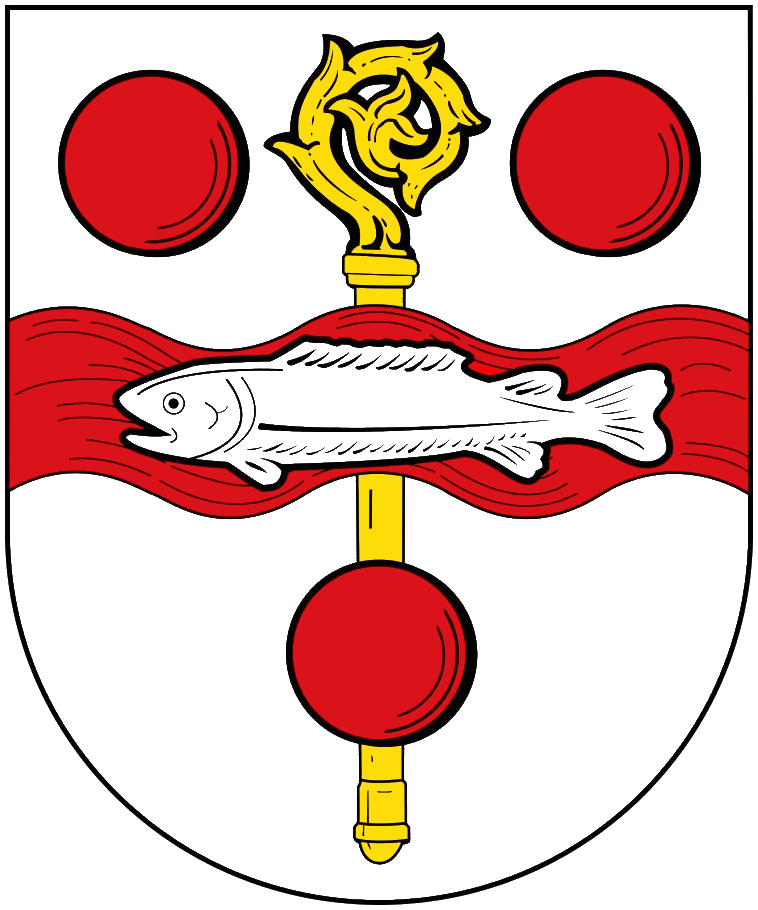
- Coat of arms

- Location of Fischbach within Kaiserslautern district
- Interactive map of Fischbach
- Location within Germany Location within Rhineland-Palatinate
- Coordinates: 49°27′17″N 7°54′47″E
- Country: Germany
- State: Rhineland-Palatinate
- District: Kaiserslautern
- Municipal assoc.: Enkenbach-Alsenborn

Government
  - Mayor (2019–24): Sascha Leidner

Area
  - Total: 15.06 km^{2} (5.81 sq mi)
- Elevation: 299 m (981 ft)

Population (2025-12-31)
  - Total: 807
  - Density: 53.6/km^{2} (139/sq mi)
- Time zone: UTC+01:00 (CET)
  - Summer (DST): UTC+02:00 (CEST)
- Postal codes: 67693
- Dialling codes: 06305
- Vehicle registration: KL
- Website: www.fischbach-pfalz.de

Fischbach (German pronunciation: [ˈfɪʃˌbax]) is a municipality in the district of Kaiserslautern, in Rhineland-Palatinate, western Germany.
