= Elmstein valley =

Village and ruined castle of Elmstein, Germany

- Elmsteiner Tal (German)
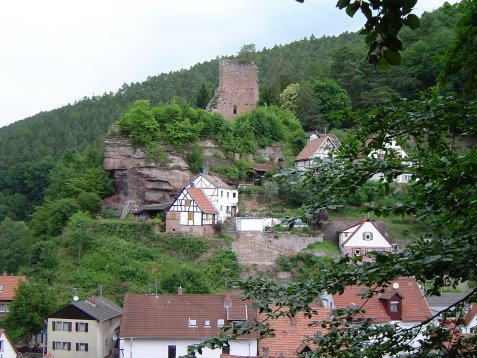
- Village and ruined castle of Elmstein

- Location within Rhineland-Palatinate
- Floor elevation: 170 m
- Length: 24 km (15 mi)
- Depth: 300 m

Geology
- Type: Bunter sandstone

Geography
- Location: Rhineland-Palatinate, Germany
- Coordinates: 49°20′48″N 7°56′52″E
- Mountain range: central Palatine Forest
- Rivers: Speyerbach and tributaries
- Interactive map of Elmstein valley

The Elmstein valley (German: Elmsteiner Tal) runs through the central Palatine Forest region between the villages of Frankeneck and Johanniskreuz in the German state of Rhineland-Palatinate. The Speyerbach stream, a left tributary of the Rhine, flows through the valley.

== Geography ==
=== Location ===
Most of the Elmstein valley lies within the county of Bad Dürkheim; two smaller segments belong to Neustadt an der Weinstraße and the county of Südliche Weinstraße. The valley is 24 kilometres long and descends from west to east from about 470 to 170 metres above sea level.

=== Waterbodies ===
The Speyerbach stream flows through the Elmstein valley. Together with its tributary streams, the biggest of which are the Helmbach and the Breitenbach, the Speyerbach drains the winding valley and the heights surrounding it.

=== Hills ===
The hills on the left-hand or northern side of the valley reach a maximum height above sea level of 514 metres in the Mückenberg and are clearly lower than those opposite. On the right hand, southern, side the Bloskülb (570 m) and the Brogberg (567 m) are the highest peaks. The highest point in the west, also the start of the valley, lies on the watershed between the Rhine and Moselle rivers, separating here the catchment areas of the Speyerbach and Schwarzbach. In the east the valley ends at the confluence of the Hochspeyerbach with the Speyerbach.

== Sights ==
=== Structures ===
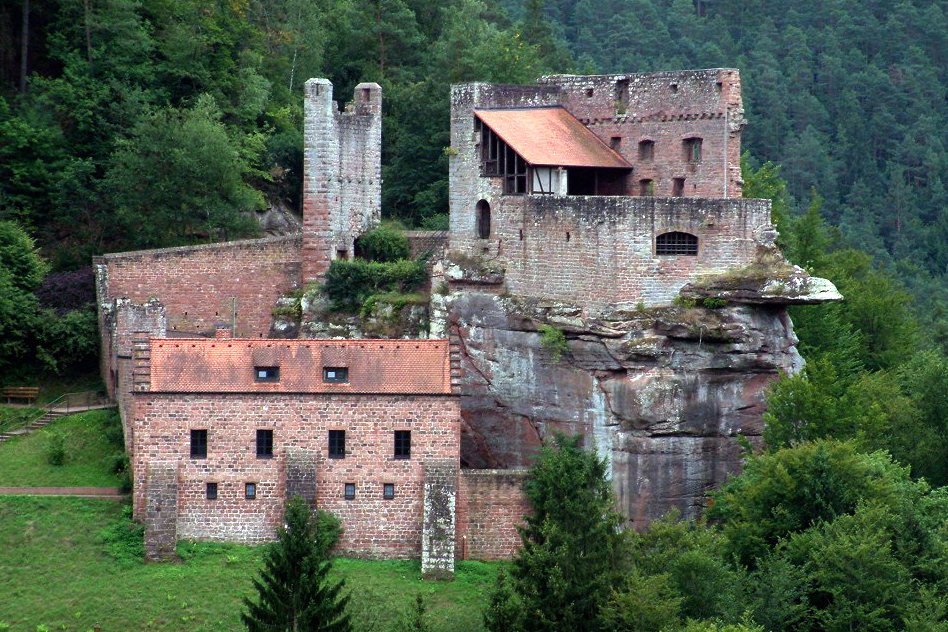
Spangenberg Castle

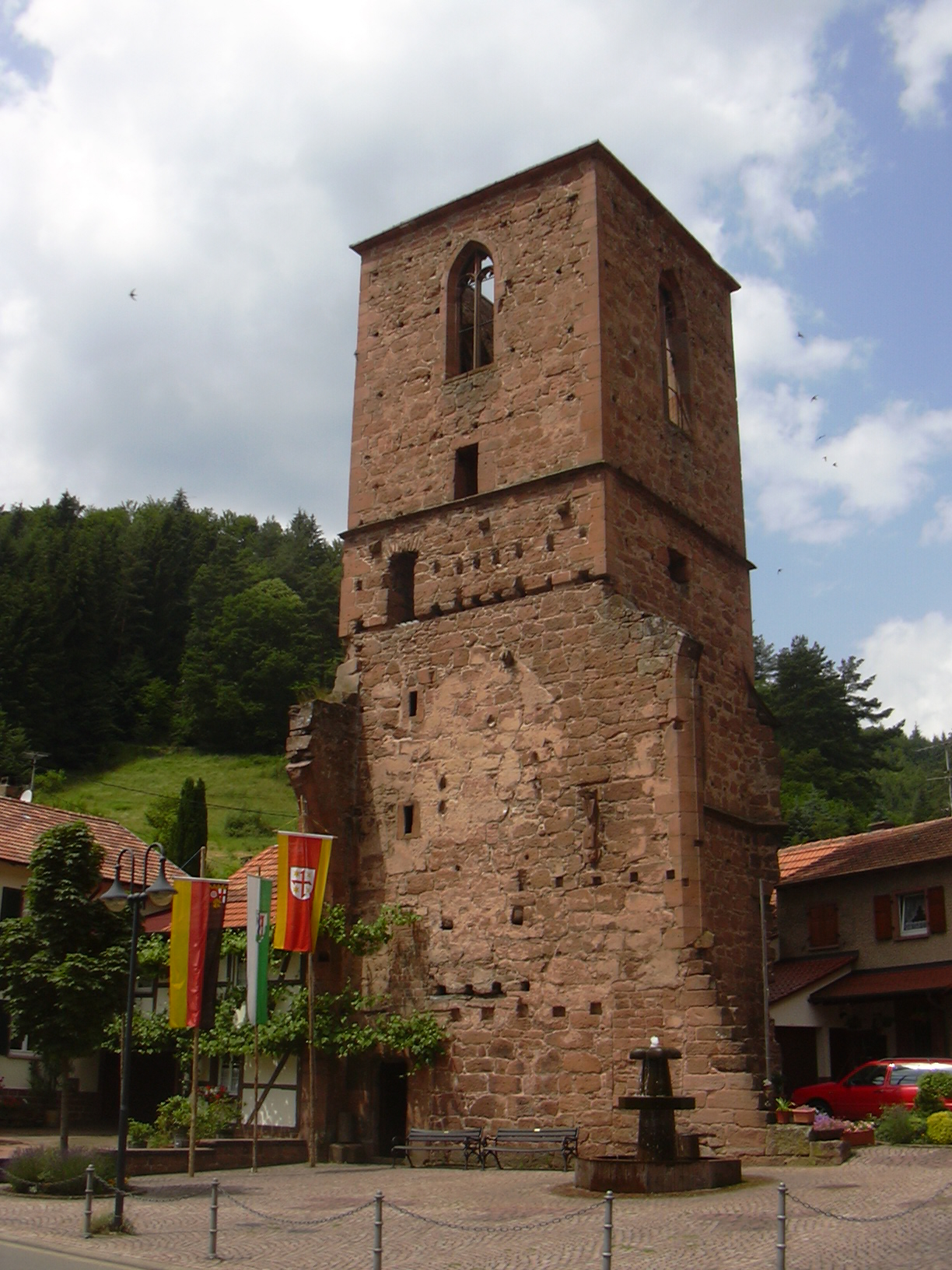
Church tower ruins at Appenthal

The four medieval castles above the valley, namely Elmstein, Breitenstein, Erfenstein and Spangenberg, guarded the sovereignty of the local territorial lords here for centuries. Today their ruins are visited by tourists, not least because of the legend of the Leather Bridge that is supposed to have existed between Erfenstein and Spangenberg. The best known of the remaining structures in the valley is the ruined tower of the 1488 church in Appenthal.

=== Museums and themed walk ===
Three museums inform visitors to Elmstein about forestry; two of them are located in the same historic building. The Forestry Museum (Waldarbeitsmuseum) in the upper storey is concerned with comprehensively covering all activities relevant to the forest. The Armoury (Wappenschmiede) on the ground floor is an iron hammer mill, that once used the waters of the Speyerbach for power for the smith's trade; today it produces electrical power that is fed into the public network. Die Alte Samenklenge hat speziell die Geschichte der Forstwirtschaft zum Thema und gibt Auskunft über Nutzung der Wälder, Samengewinnung und Aufforstung.

The information board of the Trift Way (Triftwanderweg) along the Speyerbach explains the technology associated with timber rafting. Die Touristinformation der Gemeinde Elmstein bietet geführte Wanderungen an.

== Economy and infrastructure ==
=== Economy ===
From the Middle Ages to the Modern Period, forestry was the main source of income in the whole region. Numerous log driving facilities were used to transport sawn timber on the streams, whose water power was also used to drive water mills and hammer mills.

=== Settlement ===
The valley is very sparsely populated; its population is under 3,000. Its most important parish is Elmstein, from which the valley derives its name. With the decline of forestry, more and more locals commute out of the valley to work.

=== Transport ===
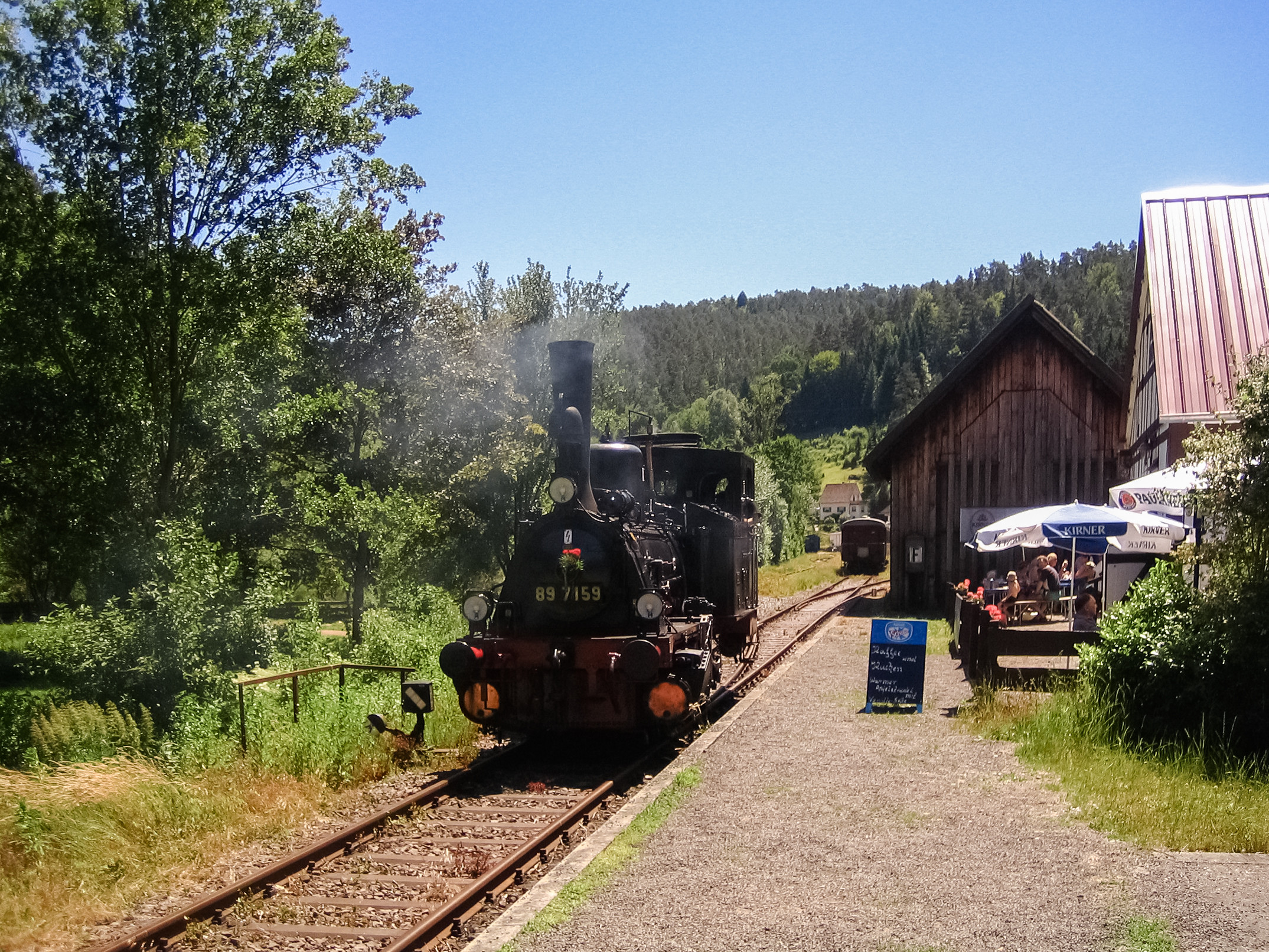
Locomotive on the Cuckoo Railway at Elmstein station

The valley is served by the Landesstraße 499 state road, which runs from Frankeneck to Johanniskreuz, linking the B 39 (Frankenstein–Neustadt an der Weinstraße) and B 48 federal highways (Hochspeyer–Bad Bergzabern). In addition there is a bus service, number 517 (Neustadt an der Weinstraße–Iggelbach), which has a journey time of about an hour.

To reduce motorcycle accidents, the very winding road through the valley is closed to motorcycle traffic in the summer half-year (April to October); only residents, not visitors, may use motorcycles on the road during the out of bounds period.

The Cuckoo Railway (Kuckucksbähnel) runs along the Speyerbach from Frankeneck to Elmstein. This line was opened in 1909 and ran passenger services until 1960. In 1984 the line was reactivated and has since been run as a heritage railway for tourists.
