= Cuckoo Railway =

Rail line in Germany

Coordinates: 49°21′57.20″N 8°2′8.60″E

Lambrecht (Pfalz)–Elmstein railway
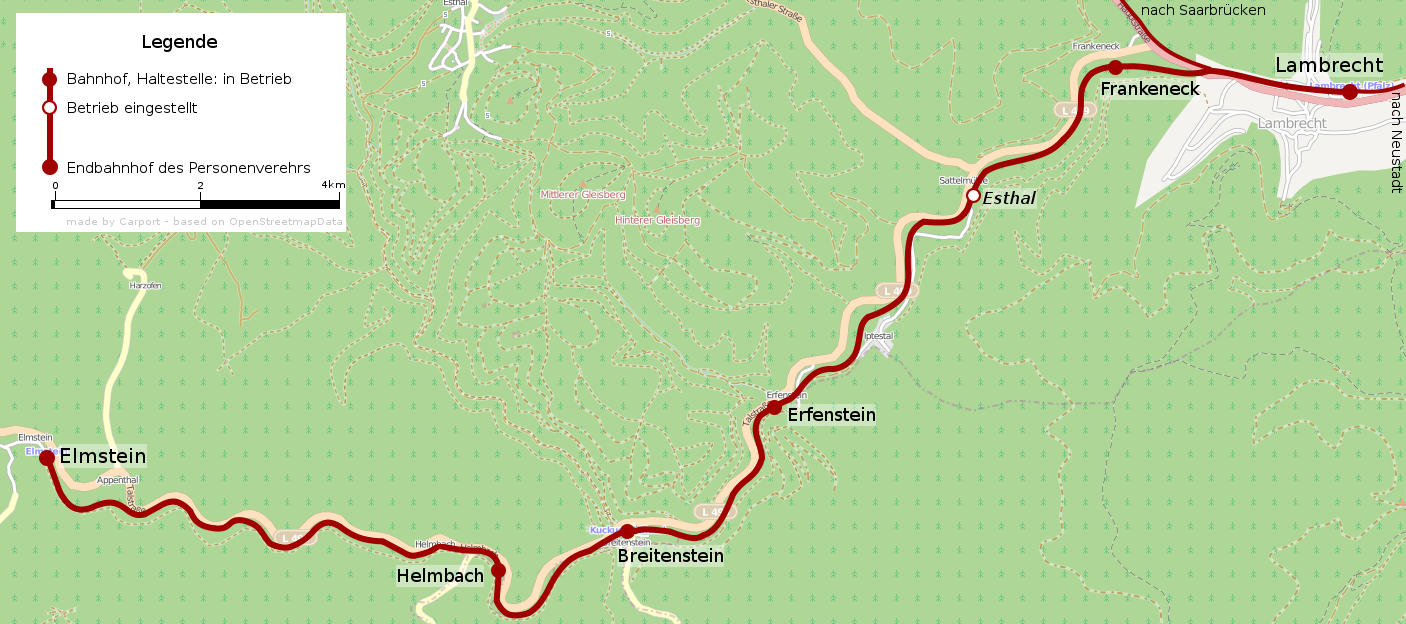

Overview
- Native name: Kuckucksbähnel
- Line number: 3432
- Locale: Rhineland-Palatinate, Germany

Service
- Route number: 279c (1949–1960); 12670 (since 1984)

Technical
- Line length: 12.97 km (8.06 mi)
- Track gauge: 1,435 mm (4 ft 8 1/2 in) standard gauge
- Maximum incline: 1.4%

The Cuckoo Railway (German: Kuckucksbähnel, literally "Little Cuckoo Railway"), in its early days the Elmstein Valley Railway (Elmsteiner Talbahn), is a 12.97 kilometre long branch line in the central Palatine Forest, which runs through the region of Neustadt/Kaiserslautern from Lambrecht to Elmstein. It was built primarily to support the local forestry industry.

In 1902 the section to Sattelmühle was opened, initially just as an industrial siding. In 1909 it was extended to Elmstein and upgraded to a fully fledged branch line. Regular passenger services were withdrawn in 1960 - due to the sparse population of the region it had always played a secondary role. This was followed in 1977 by the cessation of goods traffic between Frankeneck and Elmstein. Since 1984 the line has been operated as a heritage railway. Goods trains still run as far as Frankeneck.

== History ==
=== Background (1874–1890) ===
The Elmstein Valley, densely covered in woods and hence sparsely populated, suffered in earlier times from a poor road infrastructure, especially away from the direct route between Neustadt and Kaiserslautern. The valley follows the upper reaches of the Speyerbach river, the most important Palatine tributary of the Rhine. The key resource of the Speyerbach source region has always been its wood. For centuries, cut or split logs were transported by timber rafting down the river, i.e. propelled by the current, and were sold in the almost treeless Anterior Palatinate.

As early as March 1874 entrepreneurs from the villages of Frankeneck and Neidenfels complained that transporting goods to Lambrecht station by road would be very expensive. For this reason, they launched a petition to the Palatine Railways, which aimed at the establishment of a halt and loading point, exclusively for goods traffic, between the stations of Weidenthal and Lambrecht. This was to be built in Frankeneck immediately next to the confluence of the Hochspeyerbach and the Speyerbach. The hope was that, using this planned operating point on the Palatine Ludwig Railway, would save on transportation costs. These efforts were initially unsuccessful. However, at the end of 1881, the Palatine Ludwig Railway Company built a stackyard at Lambrecht railway station.

On 28 May 1888, 67 entrepreneurs sent a request to the Bavarian Ministry of the Interior - at that time the Palatinate belonged to the Kingdom of Bavaria - with the aim of building a tramline from Neustadt via Lambrecht and Frankeneck to Elmstein. However, this submission was not successful: the administration of the Palatine Railways came to the conclusion that the road network was satisfactory and the distance to the existing stops on the Ludwig Railway was too short to justify an additional connection. The forest authorities also criticized the proposal for a tram line because it would have made an additional transhipment of wood necessary. The Bavarian government considered it pointless to create a transport link parallel to the Ludwig Railway between Neustadt and Lambrecht.

=== Planning and opening of the Lambrecht–Sattelmühle section (1890–1902) ===
The Bavarian government had received a draft law on 5 April 1892 concerning the construction of branch lines in the Palatinate. This was intended to assign interest rate guarantees to certain routes based on the model given. During this time, the establishment of a branch line from Lambrecht to Elmstein was also discussed, for which the MP, Andreas Deinhard, used his influence in the Chamber of Representatives.

With the gradual demise of timber rafting at the end of the 19th century, the main source of livelihood in the Elmstein Valley was threatened and the population was forced to find other sources of income. Those affected saw the solution to the problem as a railway link that would act as a replacement for the transportation of wood using timber rafts. In addition the planned line was seen as a way of stimulating the economy of the valley.

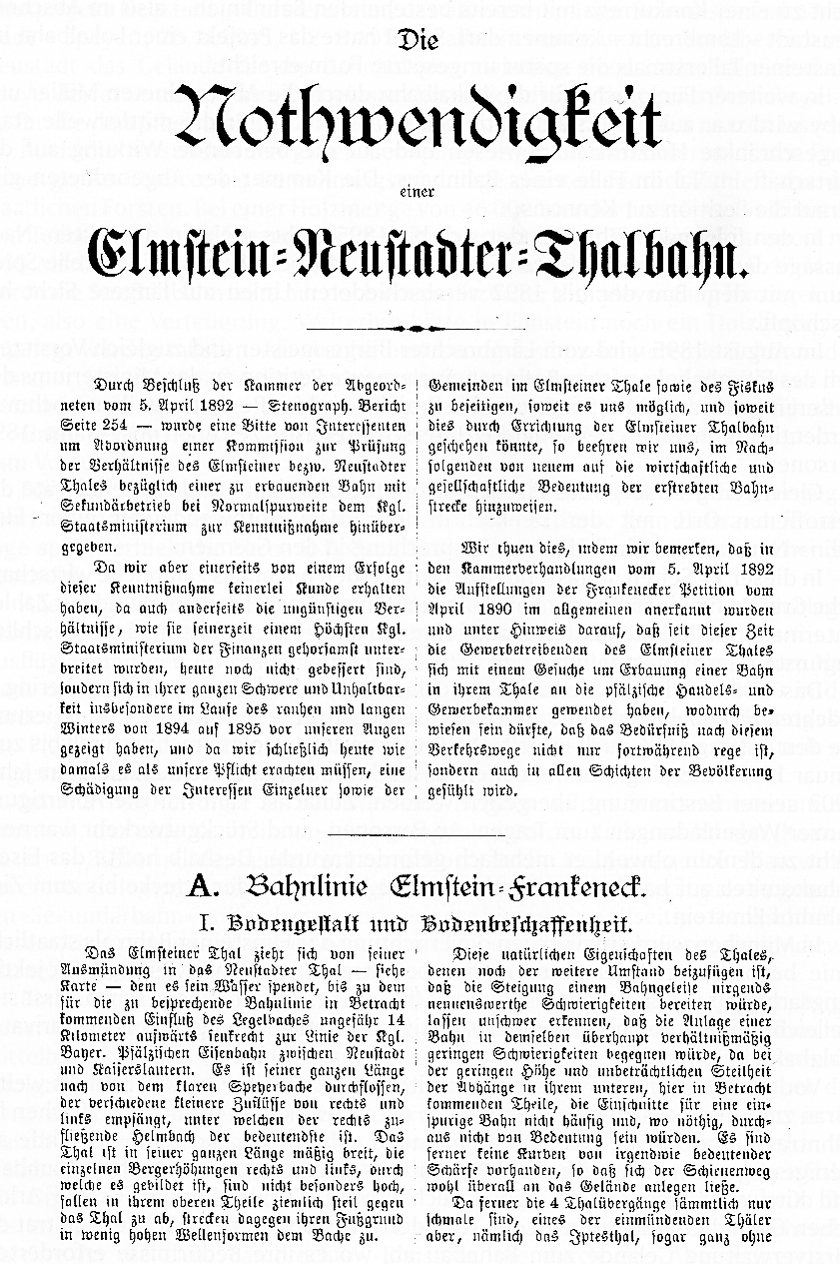
Memorandum entitled "The Necessity of an Elmstein-Neustadt Valley Railway"

In August 1895 a committee was formed under the chairmanship of Lambrecht's mayor that sent another petition to the Bavarian government. At the same time the committee engaged the relevant communities with a memorandum entitled "The Necessity of an Elmstein-Neustadt Valley Railway" (Die Nothwendigkeit einer Elmstein=Neustadter=Thalbahn). Finally, one year later, the company of Vering & Waechter was awarded the contract. Planning was completed by January 1897.

Initially an industrial siding was laid from Lambrecht station, which ran via Frankeneck to the hamlet of Sattelmühle. It was opened in 1902 and served both to transport wood from the Palatine Forest as well as to serve the timber yard in Frankeneck. At the same time it formed the first stage of the planned branch line.

=== Planning the railway line (1902–1904) ===
The committee continued to campaign for a full branch line by the construction of an extension of the industrial siding to Elmstein. The government in Bavaria took the view that it should be a national responsibility to build the line, especially because of the imminent transfer of the Palatine Railways into the ownership of the Royal Bavarian State Railways.

This railway was intended predominantly to be used for the transportation of timber, which formed the bulk of the goods traffic, and not so much for passenger services. Nevertheless, it was recognized that, because 130 workers worked away from their homes in Elstein and its outlying villages of Appenthal and Iggelbach, there was some potential for passenger traffic as well.

At the beginning of 1904, a meeting of the Palatine Forest Railway Committee (Pfälzer Waldbahn-Komitee) took place. Because the line affected various parishes whose villages were some way from the direct route - for example, Hambach, Kirrweiler and Lachen – determining the course of the trackbed proved very difficult. The villages of Elmstein and Kirrweiler were prepared to offer the necessary land for the railway without being paid. In addition, Elmstein strove to increase the contributions from Esthal, Hambach and Lachen. During the course of the negotiations, it turned out that a sum of money in the five-figure range would be needed. Elmstein wanted a grant of 35,000 marks towards land acquisition costs, but because of the opposition of the royal treasury, they were only awarded 30,000 marks. In addition, individuals such as Albert Biirklin and Count D'Arlon gave both money and land for the railway. Furthermore, road construction engineers confirmed that the maintenance costs of the planned railway line would be significantly lower than that of the local roads.

After a lengthy campaign for a railway through the Elmstein Valley the Landtag of Bavaria finally gave permission on 10 Aug 1904 for the construction of a branch line.

=== Construction and opening (1905–1909) ===
Construction work finally began in March 1905. It entailed the removal of 800,000 cubic metres (28,000,000 cu ft) of earth and cost a total of 692,000 marks. Responsibility for the course of line and the earthworks fell to the Neustadt Railway Division.

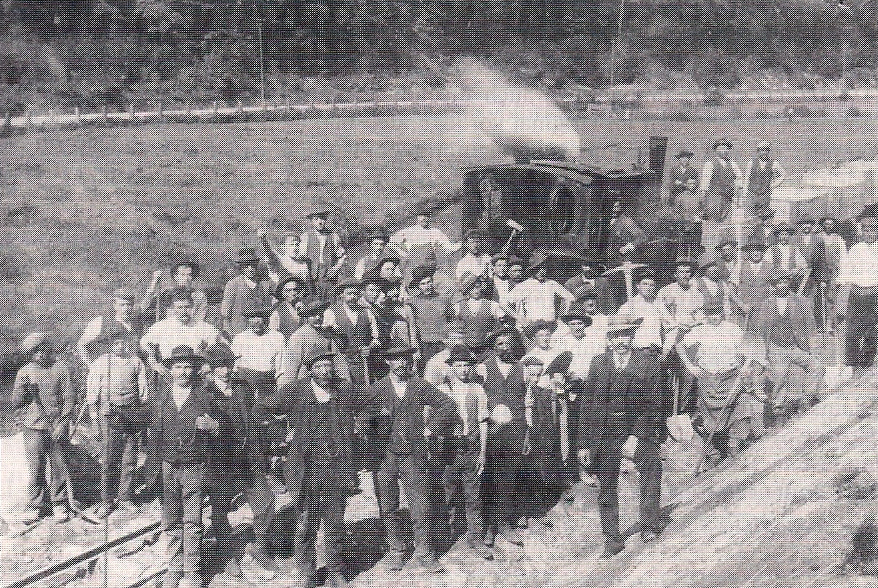
Workers and Feldbahn train during the construction of the line

The construction of the 9.55-kilometre-long (5.93 mi) section from Sattelmühle to Elmstein was carried out by German and Italian workers. In 1907, the required expansion of Lambrecht railway station followed. The local construction industry also benefited from the work of the track. The latter was done mainly by hand, but was also helped by the construction of a Feldbahn, a light field railway worked by a small steam locomotive. The track bed was built on a sandstone foundation. Eleven bridges across the Speyerbach stream were built.

On 18 January 1909, a test run on the line was undertaken in order to check it technically. The train being used for the test arrived at Elmstein station at 11 am. The official inauguration took place five days later. The first train was due to depart Elmstein at 6.20 am. However, as it was about to leave there was a fatal accident. The Jungfern service was just a few metres from the end of the line when, owing to a wrongly set turnout, the train accelerated at full steam into the locomotive shed and killed a spectator. The locomotive escaped with only a few scratches; the shed, however, suffered more serious damage that had to be repaired. As a replacement, a train from Lambrecht arrived at the end of the section at 8.15 am; around 10 am the first train finally left Elmstein for Lambrecht.

The operator was initially the Bavarian State Railways who, since 1 January, had taken over the whole Palatine railway network; so that the opening of the railway was its first official duty there.

=== Further developments (1910–1945) ===
On 1 April 1920 the line became the property of the Deutsche Reichsbahn. In 1922 it was incorporated into the newly founded Ludwigshafen Reichsbahn Division (Reichsbahndirektion Ludwigshafen). In the wake of its disbandment on 1 April 1937 the line was allocated to the Mainz Division (Reichsbahndirektion Mainz).

Although it was initially called the Elmstein Valley Railway (Elmsteiner Talbahn), over time the nickname "Little Cuckoo Line" (Kuckucksbähnel) was adopted. The call of cuckoos was once a common sound in the Elmstein Valley, which is why the local population in Elmstein were given the nickname "cuckoos" (Kuckucke). The term Kuckucksbähnel was probably coined by the owner of the s Lokschuppen restaurant at Elmstein station. The regional press gradually adopted the name until it eventually became the official name of the line.

=== Decline (1945–1977) ===
After the Second World War the railway line was the responsibility of the Operating Association of Southwest German Railways (Betriebsvereinigung der Südwestdeutschen Eisenbahnen) or SWDE, which was transferred into the newly founded Deutsche Bundesbahn (DB) in 1949. The latter assigned the Cuckoo Line to the Mainz Federal Railway Division (Bundesbahndirektion Mainz) to which all railway lines in the newly created state of Rhineland-Palatinate were allocated. At the same time the profitability of the line was questioned. On top of the rapid increase in car traffic of that time, DB itself contributed to the competition by introducing a bus service running parallel to the railway.

On 28 May 1960, regular passenger services were finally withdrawn. After the disbandment of the Mainz Division, its counterpart in Karlsruhe became responsible for the line on 1 June 1971. In 1977, goods traffic also ceased because the line had been used less and less by the forestry industry and goods takings had reduced sharply. The last scheduled goods train had already run on 30 June 1976. In its last years of operation the railway line had only had the official status of an industrial siding.

=== Plans for a heritage line (from 1977) ===
In the county of Bad Dürkheim, formed in 1969 and in which the line now lay, politicians began attempts in 1971 to preserve the line as a heritage railway. This was initially unsuccessful because DB blocked it. Nevertheless, these efforts to preserve the line did not come to a halt. For example, in the time that followed the then Transport Minister of Rhineland-Palatinate, Heinrich Holkenbrink, took part in an inspection visit. Initially DB was persuaded to delay the planned closure and intended lifting of the line to a later date. At this time the trackage was already showing signs of needing structural repair. In addition, the Karlsruhe Federal Railway Division declared itself ready to sell all the land on the collective municipality of Lambrecht (Verbandsgemeinde Lambrecht).

Because the revival of the line initially appeared unrealistic, plans were made to convert the trackbed into a cycleway or track for post coaches. Meanwhile, the broadcasters, Südwestfunk, were planning a television series, The Soldier of Fortune - The Adventures of Robert Curwich. The company saw the village of Breitenstein, including the railway, as a suitable location, which is why the partially overgrown line between Lambrecht and Breitenstein had to be cleared. In addition, the railway embankment had to be made safe and the track repaired in places. Shooting itself took place in May 1983.

At the same time there were lengthy discussions with DB which saw the railway being sold to the county. The contract was signed in Spring 1984. The plans envisaged operating the line as a heritage railway in cooperation with the German Railway History Company's museum at Neustadt an der Weinstraße. On 14 February 1984 railway fans founded the "Little Cuckoo Line Operating Company" (Kuckucksbähnel-Betriebs-GmbH) or KKB, which was initially owned by the town of Neustadt an der Weinstraße, the collective municipality of Lambrecht, three clubs from the region and several private individuals.

=== Heritage railway (since 1984) ===
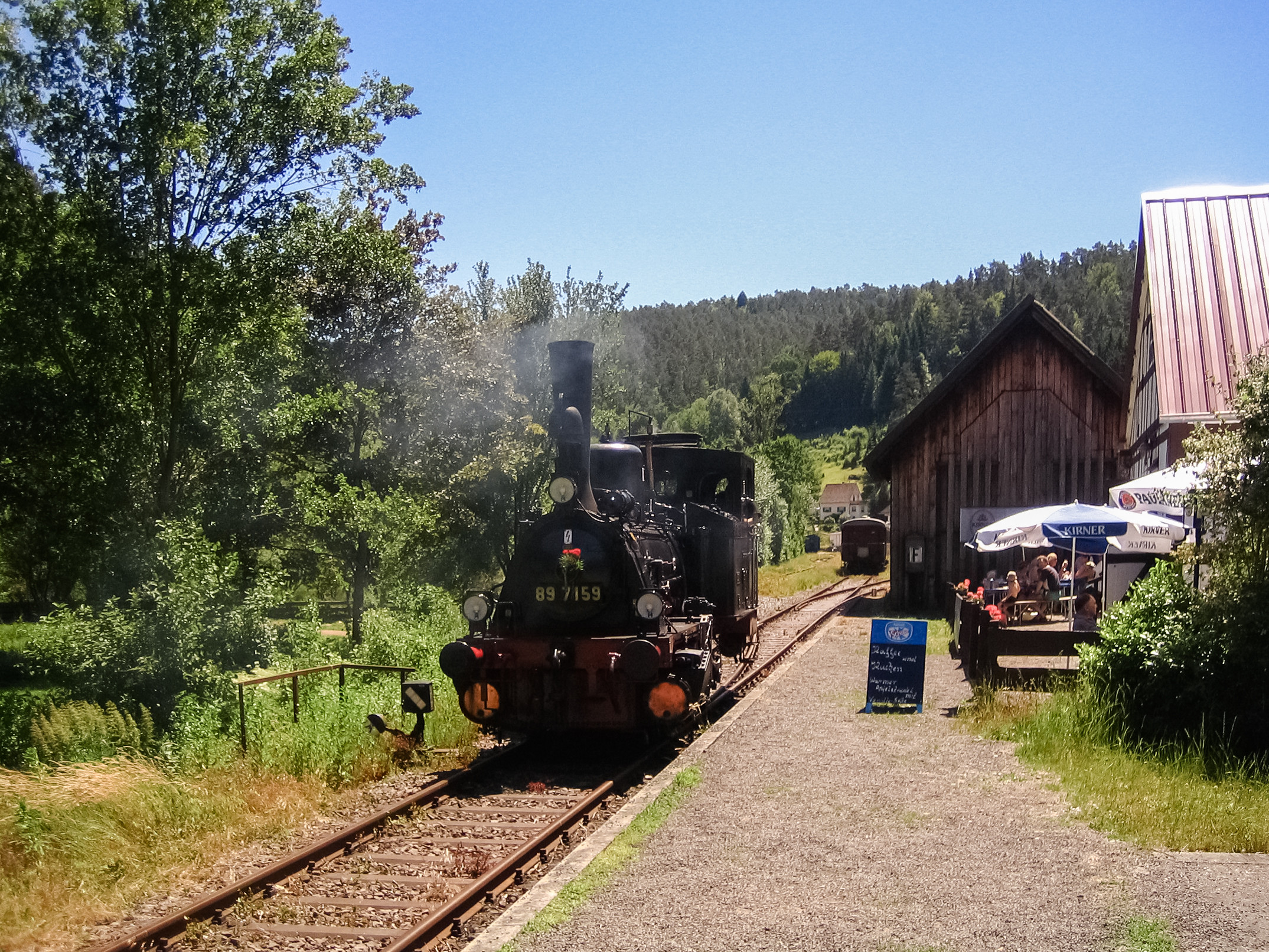
Locomotive 89 7159 in Elmstein station

Finally, on 2 June 1984, the museum line was opened. The inaugural train departed at 9.45 am from Neustadt Central Station and carried 350 passengers. It had to be hauled to Lambrecht by the diesel locomotive, V 36 127, due to restrictions placed by the Bundesbahn .

Since then the line has been mainly used by holidaymakers and day trippers. As a result of the large numbers of customers, trains also had to be lengthened. In the years that followed, special trains were often run, for example, the Glass Train visited twice. In June 2004 the Cuckoo Line celebrated its 20th anniversary as a heritage railway.

== Route ==
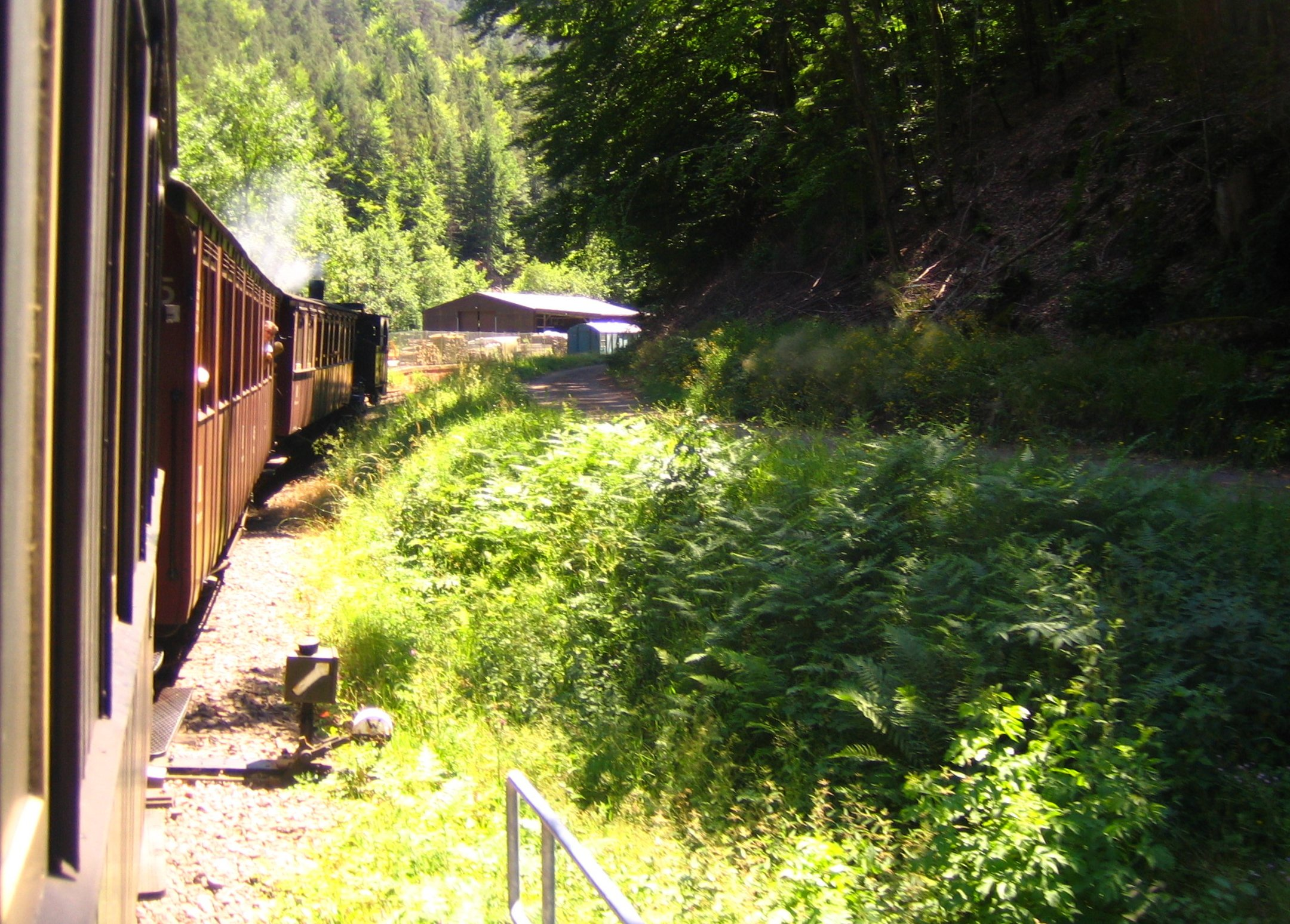
The Cuckoo Railway between Elmstein and Helmbach

After leaving Lambrecht station the railway line uses the southern track of the Mannheim–Saarbrücken railway before branching off to the southwest into the Elmstein Valley after about a kilometer. Immediately afterwards it passes over the B 39 federal highway on an overbridge. It passes the old Lambrecht Goods Station and the village of Frankeneck and then follows the Speyerbach stream, crossing it five times as it snakes back and forth repeatedly. After that it only passes through very small settlements like Sattelmühle, Erfenstein and Breitenstein as well as running past several castles such as the ruins of Erfenstein and Spangenberg, both linked to a local legend. It then runs through almost undisturbed nature. After Helmbach is a section with an incline of 1 : 69 (14 ‰) as it passes through a gorge.

The line ends at the entrance to Elmstein, where the main operating point is located. The signs for the halts are written in Fraktur lettering and their platforms are largely grassed over.

The Lambrecht–Elmstein railway runs entirely within the county of Bad Dürkheim and also the parish of the collective municipality of Lambrecht. In addition to the town of Lambrecht, it also links the communities of Frankeneck, Esthal (from the abandoned halt of Esthal to Breitenstein) and Elmstein (from Helmbach to the end of the line). Between Breitenstein and Helmbach it twice crosses the territory of Kirrweiler (Pfalz), an exclave of the county of Südliche Weinstraße. From Iptestal until just before Breitenstein the line borders on the borough of Neustadt immediately to the south.

== Transport ==
=== Passenger traffic ===
In the early months three pairs of trains operated daily between Lambrecht and Elmstein. But as early as May 1909 a new timetable appeared, according to which there were four trains each way on working days and five on Sundays. The trains comprised second, third and, until 28 Oct 1928, fourth class coaches. In addition, the Palatine Forest Club, founded in 1902, arranged for the timetable to be adjusted for excursion traffic.

The journey time between Lambrecht and Elmstein was initially between 45 and 51 minutes, but this reduced over the course of time to around 30 minutes.

=== Goods traffic ===
Goods traffic, which always had a greater significance on the railway than passenger traffic, was largely sustained by the timber industry of the region. Consequently, flatbeds and open wagons were utilized. From 1902 to 1909 the Sattelmühle Goods Loading Yard (Güterverladestelle Sattelmühle) was the transshipment point for goods from the Elmstein Valley.

In the last years of goods services operating between Frankeneck and Elmstein, freight was only moved on Mondays, Wednesdays and Fridays. The last scheduled DB goods train was on 30 June 1976. It hauled two empty wagons and one laden with timber. Officially goods traffic on this section of line, which by this stage was only an industrial siding, was ceased on 29 May 1977. That said, the Bundesbahn announced it was prepared to transport freight from the storage areas of the railway.

Frankeneck station, which was now just a part of Lambrecht station, continued to be served. Until 1996 timber was still loaded here; one year later the goods tracks were lifted. Until the end of 2004 there was an industrial siding to the Julius Glatz GmbH paper fabric from the direction of Lambrecht. Entsprechende Gleisreste befinden sich im Firmengelände. Five years later the factory was given a new siding, this time from the direction of Elmstein. A lorry with additional wheelsets for rails is available for the loading of goods.

=== Heritage railway services ===
The trains of the Cuckoo Railway generally start at platform 5 of the central station in Neustadt an der Weinstraße. Over a length of just under seven route kilometres the trains run along the double-tracked, electrified Mannheim–Saarbrücken railway. At Lambrecht station the trains of the Cuckoo Line always depart from platform 1.

From April to October two pairs of trains work the line on Sundays and holidays. The first train of the day leaves between 10 and 11 a.m. from Neustadt, where the final service of the day from Elmstein ends between 18 and 19 00 hours. The other two services begin and end in Lambrecht. The journey time between Lambrecht and Elmstein is roughly one hour.

Ticket prices vary from 5 to 25 euros. There are reductions for children, families and groups. Tickets for the Cuckoo Railway are also valid for the DB connecting train between Lambrecht and Neustadt.

Special trains may also use the line.

== Running and rolling stock ==
=== 1909 to 1977 period ===
The nearest depot, Bahnbetriebswerk Neustadt, was primarily responsible for the running and rolling stock used on the line. The steam locomotives used in the first years of operation, were those of classes T 4.I and T 4.II of the Palatinate Railway. They were working the Cuckoo Railway until the late 1930s. From 1927, the Prussian T 9 - designated by the Deutsche Reichsbahn as DRG Class 91 - could be found on the route and, later, its sub-type, the Class T 9.3 was a common sight. Some years later, the DRG Class 64 locomotives, which had been stabled in Neustadt since 1928, also worked the branch line. In the first half of the 1950s, classes 57.10 (formerly the Prussian G 10) and 74 (formerly the Prussian T 12) were also used. The latter was especially employed on shunting duties. On 22 August 1954, number 91 593 headed the last scheduled steam-hauled passenger train. On this day it was decorated with the words "Cuckoo's last journey" (Kuckucks letzte Fahrt).

From the early 1960s, diesel traction replaced steam for goods haulage. Because the Neustadt engine shed was, at this time, being gradually wound down, the line was increasingly becoming the responsibility of its counterpart in Ludwigshafen. Until 1973 the latter deployed locomotives of Class V 20 that had originally served the wartime Wehrmacht. From 1973 until the cessation of goods services to Elmstein, Köf III engine, number 333 170-9, was utilized for the remaining sporadic requirements.

From March until the withdrawal of passenger services in 1960, passenger trains used Uerdingen railbuses. These were stabled in Bahnbetriebswerk Landau; from where they served the whole of the Palatinate region.

=== Museum stock ===
The engines and wagons of the Cuckoo Line are maintained for the KKB in the railway museum in Neustadt by the German Railway History Company (DGEG). This railway museum is housed in the historic engine shed at Neustadt's central station.

==== Locomotives ====
The locomotives working the heritage line are the tender engine, Speyerbach, a three-axled former industrial engine dating to 1904, and number 89 7159, a Prussian locomotive of Class T 3 dating to 1910. The latter had previously been deployed on the Acher Valley Railway. They haul various historic wagons through the Elmstein Valley. In addition, a diesel locomotive is available: a Class V 36 with running number 127, that was built in 1941.

==== Wagons ====
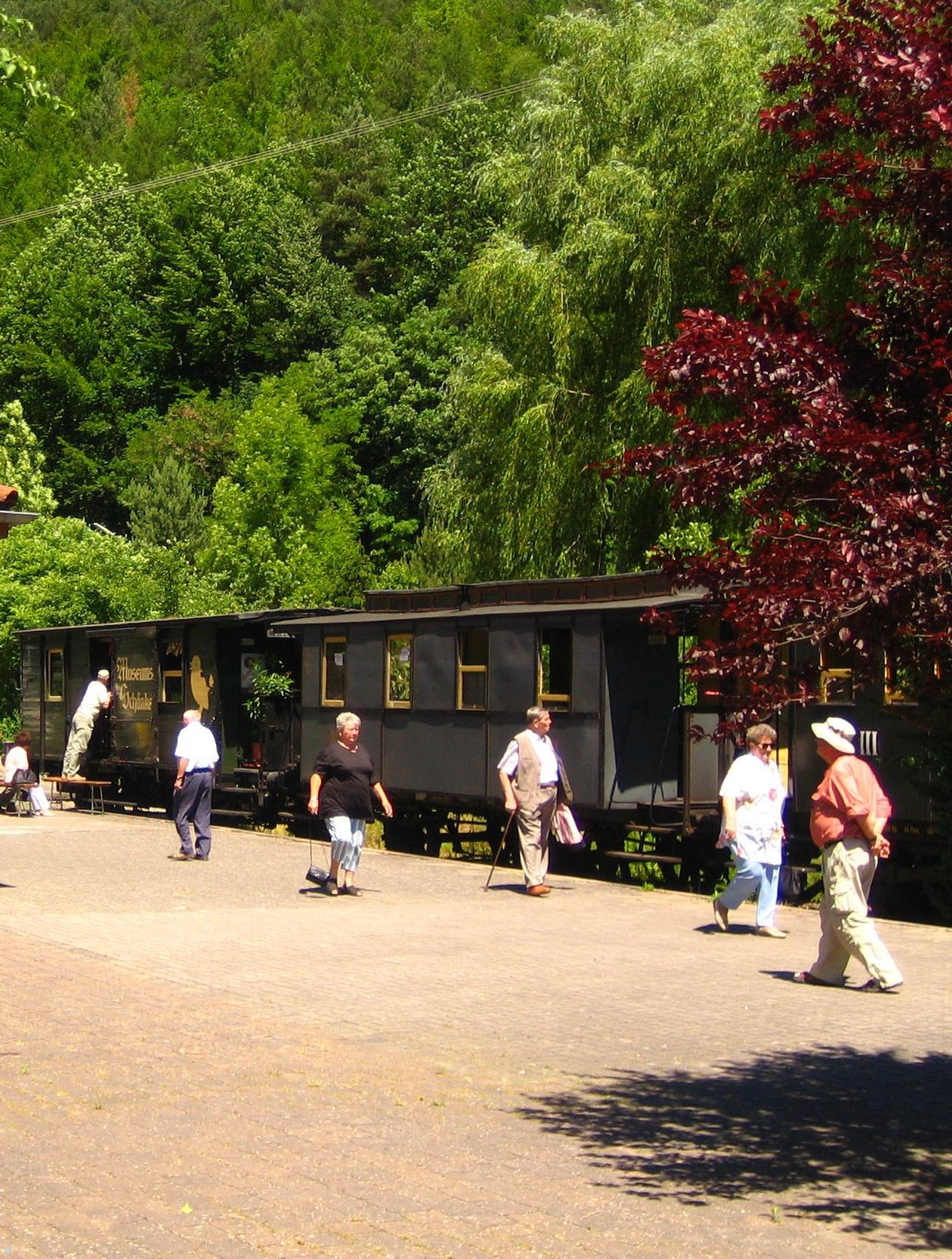
Wagon and museum pub (extreme left)

Wagon	Built	Former use	Remarks
Baden 12 240	1898	Baden State Railways	
Stuttgart 11 150	1909	Baden State Railways	
CCi 4918	1902	Royal Württemberg State Railways	Third class
BCCi 2455	1901	Royal Württemberg State Railways	
Wagen 53	1945	Bern-Lötschberg-Simplon Railway	
Wagen 92	1945	Bern-Lötschberg-Simplon Railway	
Four-axled Umbauwagon		Post-war DB rebuild of an old Prussian branch line passenger coach	
Di 4	1891	Eisern-Siegen Railway	
DGEG 102	1902	Former branch line luggage van	Converted to a bar wagon; currently houses the so-called Museumsschänke (museum pub)

== Stations and halts ==
=== Lambrecht (Pfalz) ===
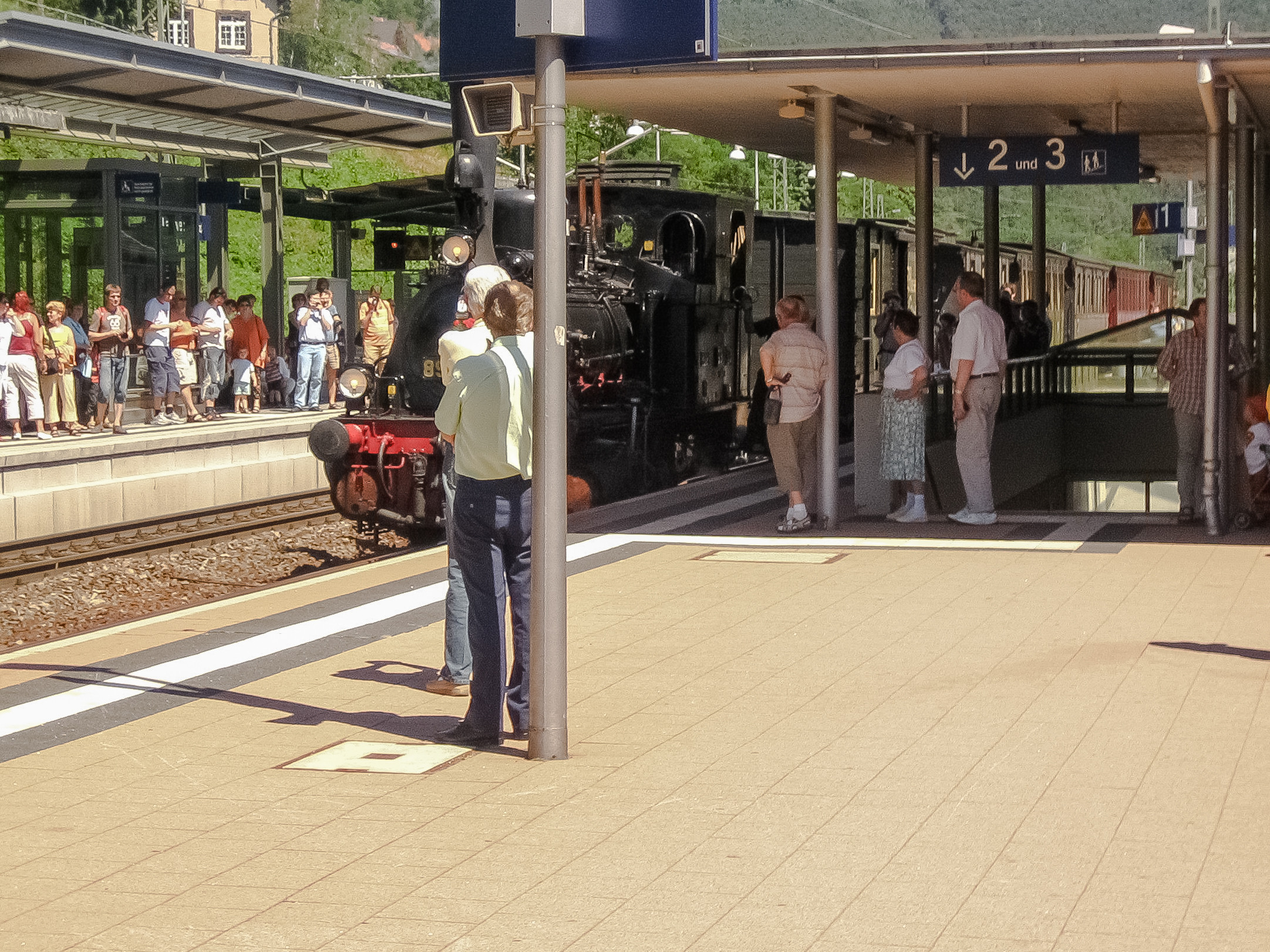
Lambrecht (Pfalz) station

The station was opened on 25 August 1849 when the gap in the Palatine Ludwig Railway between Frankenstein and Neustadt was closed. The completion of this section overcame the complicated topography of the Neustadt valley which had hitherto stood in the way. Lambrecht was one of two intermediate stations along this stretch of line.

Its original station building was designed in a style that was common for stations in the Palatinate especially in the second half of the 19th century. It was destroyed in the Second World War. The current station building was built in 1957. Since 12 March 1964 the station has also been electrified. It was integrated in 2003 into the network of the S-Bahn RheinNeckar.

The old goods shed, which was last used as a private house, was torn down in 1999 to create car parking. From 16 May that year, an electronic signal box became operational in Neustadt whereupon the station lost its last employees. In addition, Deutsche Bahn dismantled some of the trackage, leaving the station with just three tracks.

=== Frankeneck and Lambrecht Goods Yard ===
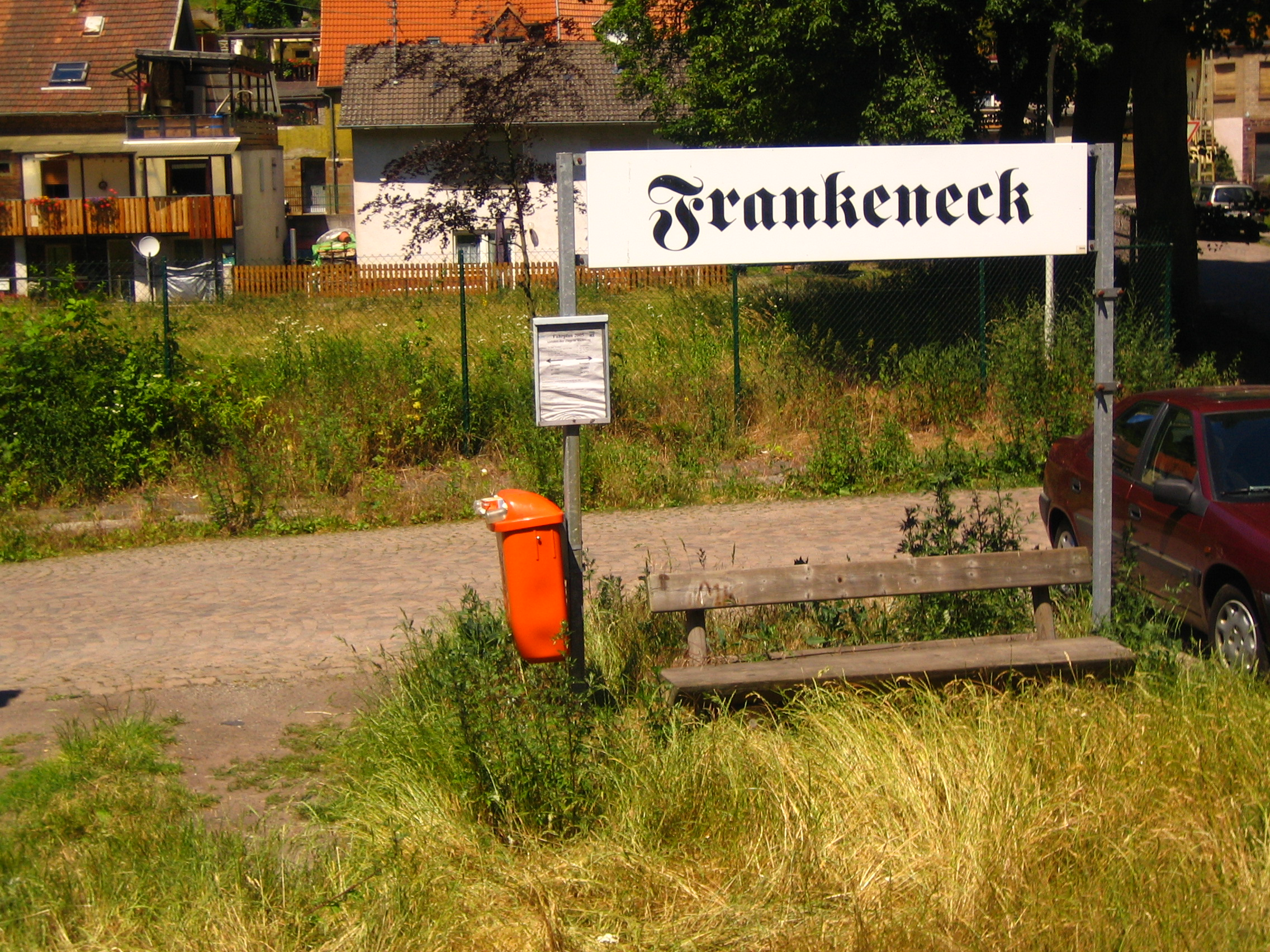
Frankeneck Halt

The halt and former station is also in the borough of Lambrecht not far from the northeastern edge of the village of Frankeneck. During Bavarian State Railway times it was classified as Type 2 station, which meant that it handled "passenger, luggage and express goods". Because space at Lambrecht station was restricted and at the limits of its capacity, this station acted for decades as the "Lambrecht Goods Yard" (Güterbahnhof Lambrecht). Several years after the closure of the line, it was redesignated as "Frankeneck Yard of Lambrecht (Pfalz) Station" (Bahnhofsteil Frankeneck des Bf Lambrecht (Pfalz)).

With the regular opening of the railway the station was given a station building as it was the only intermediate station along the route. Because it had a rather low importance it was correspondingly small. In the mid-1970s it was dismantled and rebuilt 200 metres away, not far from the local road through the valley. By the turn of the millennium it was no longer occupied and rather run down.

In 1926 it was given another building that functioned as a goods shed. At the same time the station was expanded. In the course of this, a locomotive shed was built that has since been demolished.

=== Esthal ===
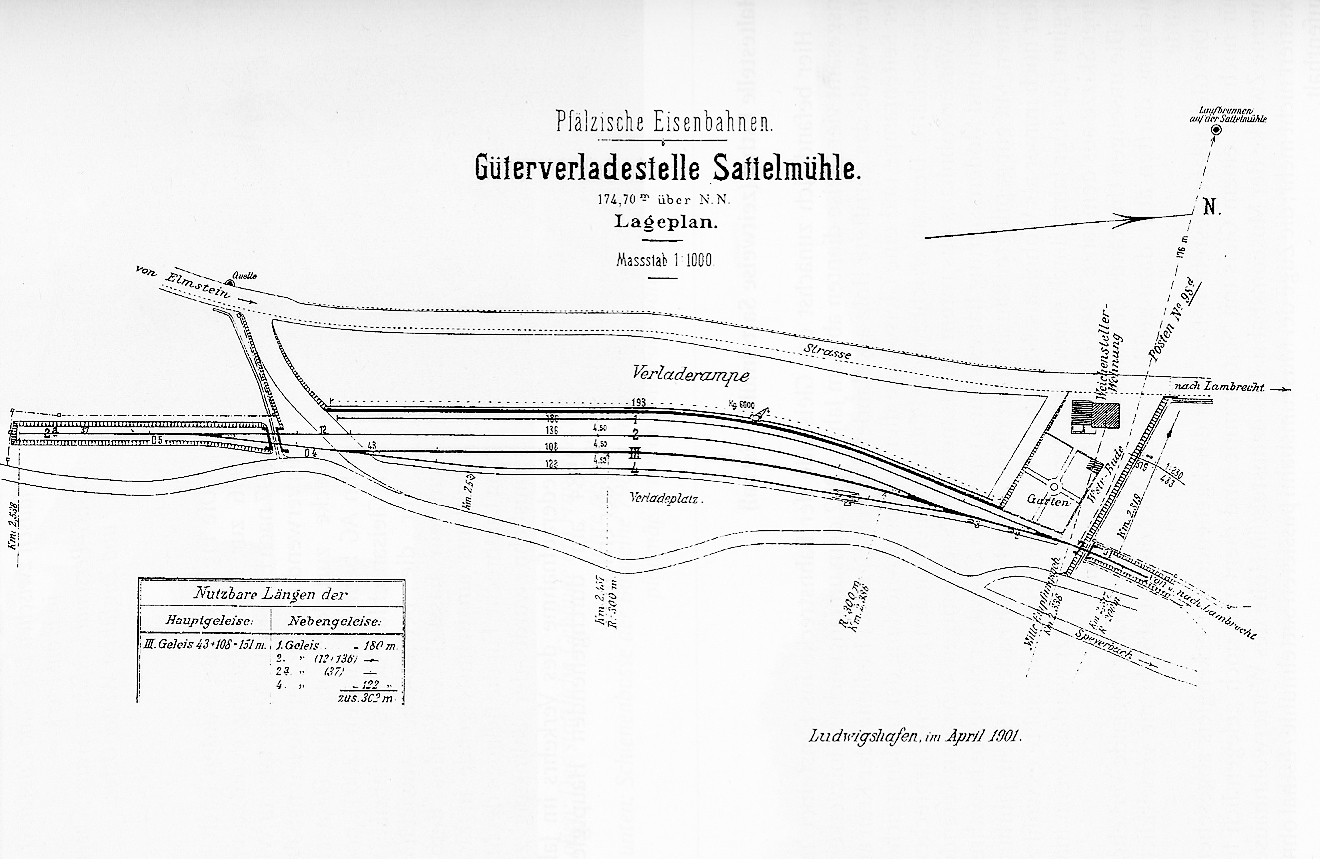
Sattelmühle goods loading yard in the early 20th century

From 1902 to 1909 the so-called Sattelmühle goods loading yard (Güterverladestelle Sattelmühle) was the end of the industrial siding that began in Lambrecht. On the opening of the remaining section of the branch line in 1909 it also became a halt for passenger trains and was renamed Sattelmühle-Esthal because of its importance for the settlement of Esthal, around four kilometres away. During the Bavarian State Railways era it was also categorized as a Type 2 station, which meant that it handled passengers, luggage and express goods.

The platform, which has since been demolished, was between the two surviving tracks. Additional facilities included a goods shed. During the Second World War there were plans by the Reichsbahn to upgrade the halt to a full station; but this was never realised. Towards the end it was just called Esthal. The halt has not been reactivated since the formation of the heritage line.

=== Erfenstein ===
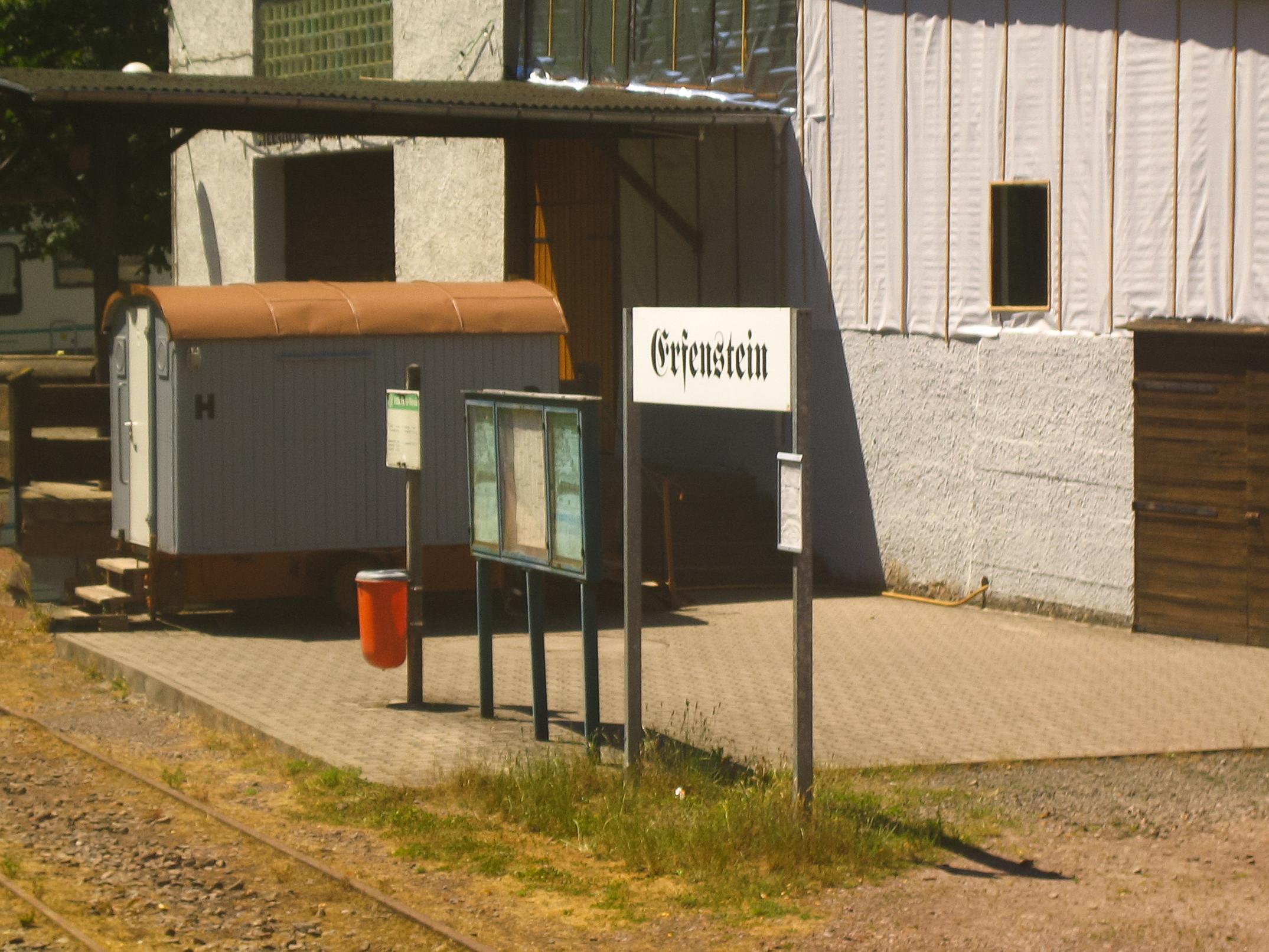
Erfenstein station

Originally the platform was located between the bridge over the Speyerbach towards Lambrecht and turnout 101 in the northern part of the station. During the time of the Bavarian State Railways it was designated as a Type 2 station. The points originally had a rod drive that has since been abandoned, but remnants of it can still be seen.

Today the station, which is level with the hamlet of the same name and not far from the eponymous castle, is the only intermediate stop where trains are able to pass one another. Such train crossings are rare, however, usually only taking place when there are special services. As a result, Erfenstein currently has an island platform. The western track acts as a crossing or passing loop, but was originally purely a loading siding open accessible only in the direction of Lambrecht. Following its conversion to a passing station, it was given another turnout, number 102. This has a Länderbahnen rail profile, mounted on steel sleepers.

=== Breitenstein (station and halt) ===
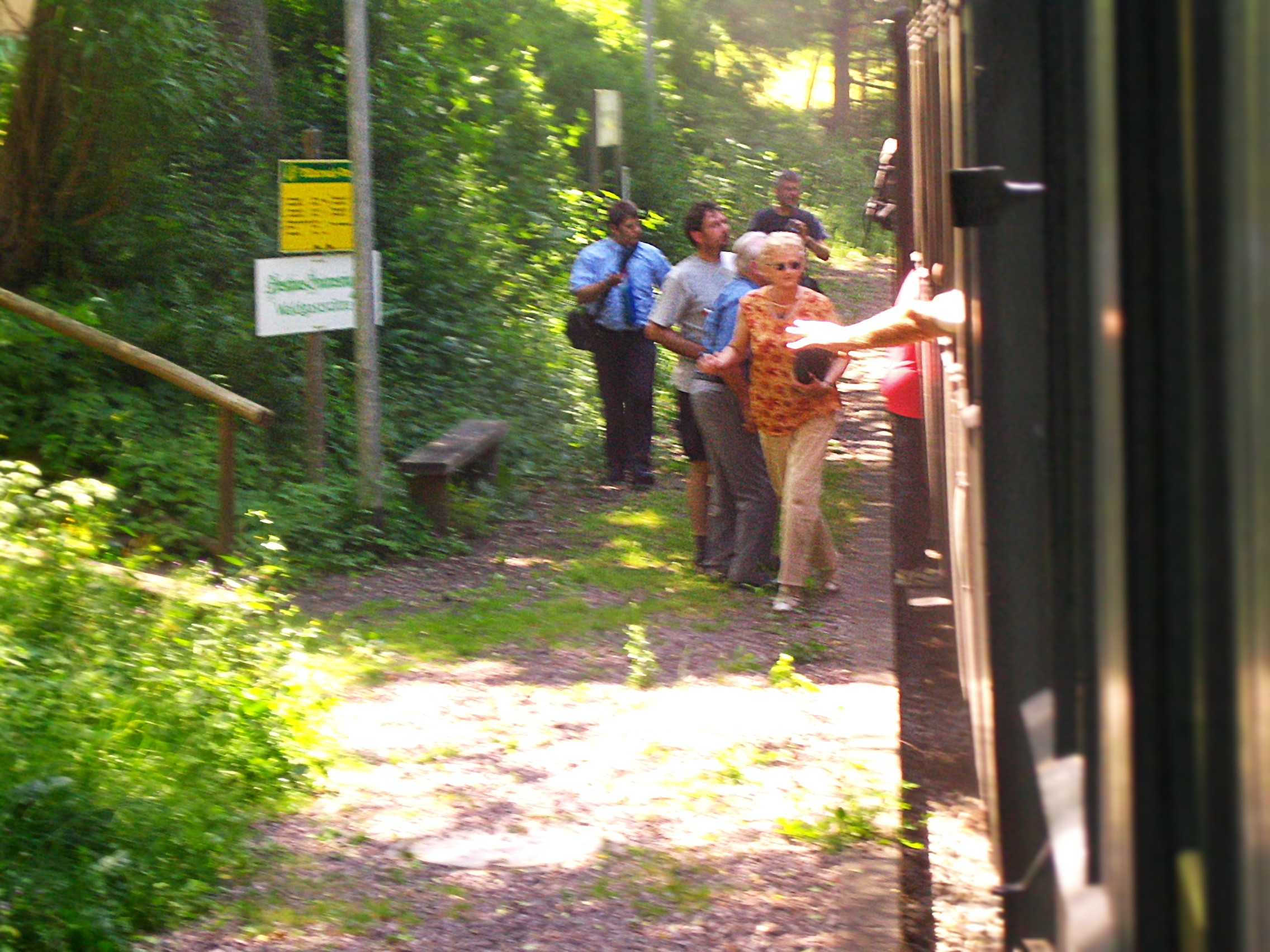
Passengers changing at Breitenstein

The present railway station is located at route kilometre 7.44. It has a storage siding facing Lambrecht, which used to be accessible from the direction of Elmstein as well. North of the running track there used to be a 50 metre long platform which is now used to stack track. In addition there was also a loading siding that was lifted following the withdrawal of regular passenger services in 1960. Alle drei Gleise kreuzten damals die nahe Totenkopfstraße.

During the time of the Bavarian State Railways, Breitenstein was classified as a Type 2 station. Bereits am 25. Dezember 1913 erfolgte die Einstellung des Fahrkartenverkaufs an der Bahnstation.

The present halt was built by the heritage railway 130 metres further west, not far from the forester's lodge, Forsthaus Breitenstein. It is separated from the station by the Totenkopfstrasse road. Unter ihn hindurch fließt der Argenbach, ein rechter Nebenfluss des Speyerbachs.

=== Helmbach (station and halt) ===
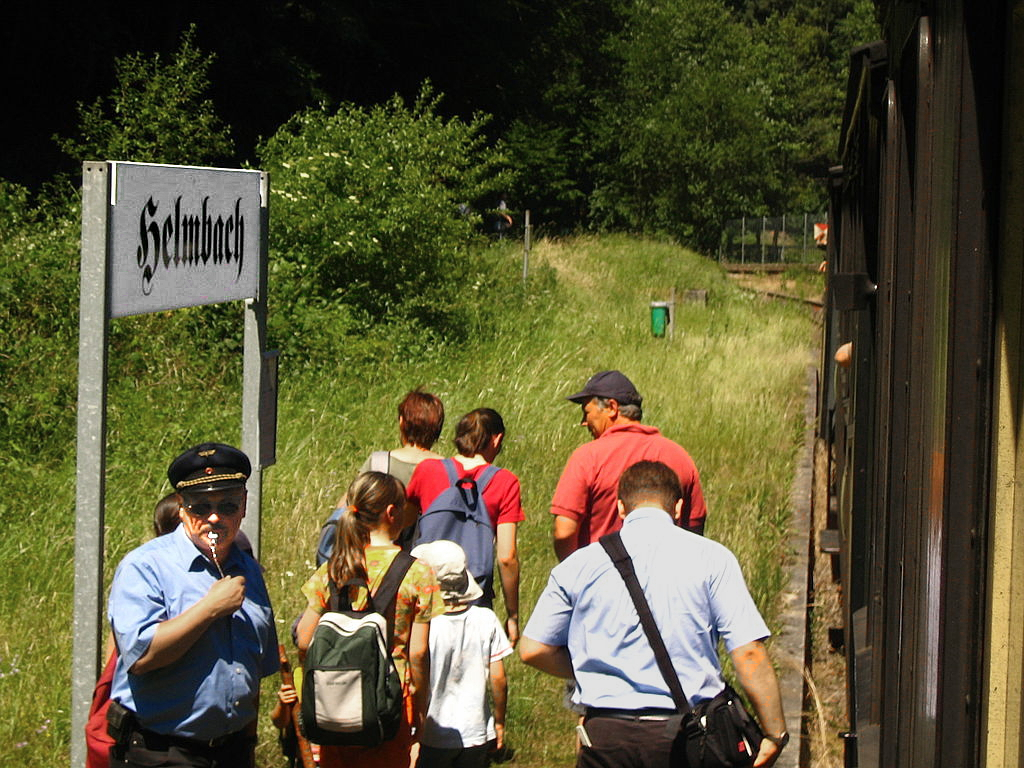
Helmbach Halt

The present station is at route kilometre 9.18. It has a siding that faces Lambrecht. During the Bavarian State Railways era it was called Helmbacher Sägemühle ("Helmbach Sawmill") and was a Type 2 station. The current platform is located between the level crossing with the Kreisstraße 51 road to Iggelbach and turnout number 104. The loading of timber there was a major freight activity, which is why the station was equipped with five turnouts, two side- and one end-loading ramps. It also had two loading sidings, one of which was a loop off the running track.

The present halt is around 300 metres east at the site of a former turnout and cannot be accessed directly by roads or tracks.

=== Elmstein ===
The station is on the southeastern edge of Elmstein. Of all the halts along the line, this was the most important for passenger traffic. Annual ticket sales at the station ran to five figures. During the Bavarian State Railway era it was classed as a Type 1 station, which meant that it handled passenger and also luggage services. In addition it was used periodically as a locomotive station for the Neustadt shed. The station building has survived. The former locomotive shed houses a restaurant.

== Bibliography ==
- Schreiner, Werner (2 June 1984). Kuckucks-Bähnel. Festschrift zur Wiederinbetriebnahme der Bahnstrecke Neustadt (Weinstraße)–Lambrecht–Elmstein als Museumsbahn (in German). Lambrecht: Edeldruck Verlag.
- Frank, Reiner (2001). Eisenbahn im Elmsteiner Tal einst und jetzt (in German). Werl: Deutsche Gesellschaft für Eisenbahngeschichte. ISBN 3-921700-90-6.
- Holzborn, Klaus D. (1993). Eisenbahn-Reviere Pfalz (in German). Berlin: transpress. pp. 47–54. ISBN 3-344-70790-6.
- Schreiner, Werner (1985). Kuckucks-Bähnel und Elmsteiner Tal. Museumsbahn und Landschaft (in German). Lambrecht: Edeldruck Verlag.
- Sturm, Heinz (2005). Die pfälzischen Eisenbahnen (in German). Ludwigshafen: pro message. ISBN 3-934845-26-6.
