= Spangenberg Castle (Rhineland-Palatinate) =

Castle in Germany

- Burg Spangenberg
- Neustadt an der Weinstraße (forest estate)
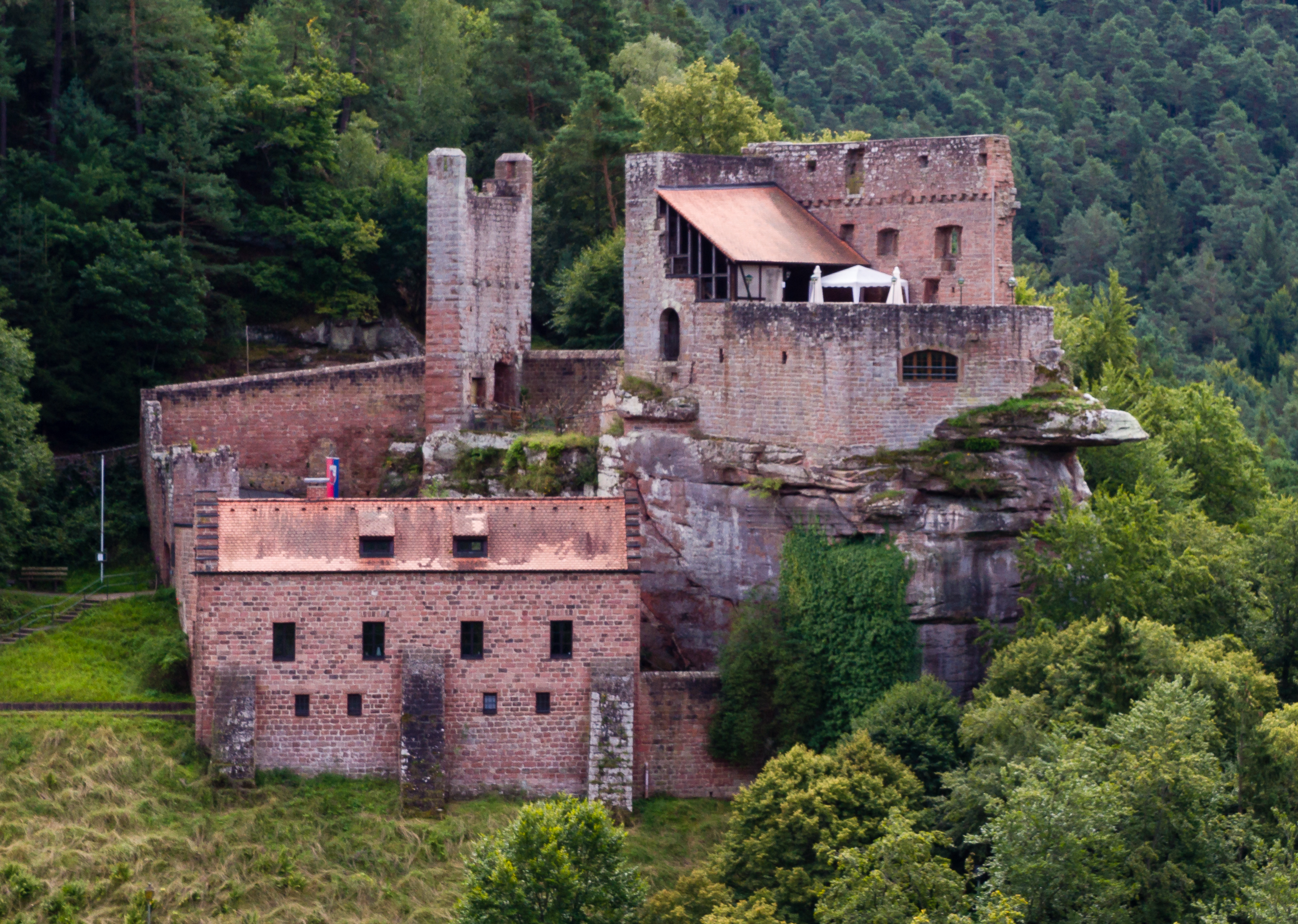
- Spangenberg Castle seen from Erfenstein Castle to the north

Site information
- Type: rock castle, hill spur location
- Code: DE-RP
- Condition: partly reconstructed ruins

Location
- Coordinates: 49°21′04″N 8°00′57″E
- Height: Height missing, see template documentation

Site history
- Built: 11th century

Spangenberg Castle (German: Burg Spangenberg) is the partially rebuilt ruin of a rock castle in the German state of Rhineland-Palatinate. It lies in the Palatine Forest above the Elmstein valley near the village of Erfenstein, but is actually on the forest estates belong to the town of Neustadt an der Weinstraße, or more precisely, the village of Lachen-Speyerdorf. Together with the neighbouring castle of Erfenstein, it is linked to the legend of the Leather Bridge.

== History ==
Spangenberg Castle was probably built in the 11th century. In 1100 it came into the possession of the Prince-Bishopric of Speyer as a castle in fee (Lehnsburg) granted by the bishop.

The knight, Diether of Zoller, was entrusted with the castle in 1317 as its castellan (Burgmann).

In 1431, Eberhard of Sickingen became the vassal of the castle and Henry of Remchingen after him, in 1439.

The historic background to the legend of the Leather Bridge is that both castles were always owned by different lords - to begin with the Spangenberg belonged to the prince-bishops of Speyer and Erfenstein, as mentioned, to the Leiningens - who were in competition with one another. In 1470 when their owners had subsequently changed, both castles were destroyed - first Erfenstein and then the Spangenberg - by their opponents during the Weißenburg Feud between Elector Frederick I of the Palatinate and his cousin, Duke Louis I of Palatinate-Zweibrücken. Erfenstein has since lain in ruins.

In 1505 a stud "garden" (Stutengarten) was laid out in the nearby woods. Spangenberg Castle, made habitable again, acted for just under 100 years as the residence of the master of the stud. But in the Thirty Years' War (1618–1648) the castle was destroyed in the very first year of the war by army commander, Ernest of Mansfeld. It was destroyed again at the start of the War of the Palatine Succession (1688) and finally again by troops of Louis XIV, the King of France.

Around 1900 the ruins came into municipal ownership. Today they are owned by the town of Neustadt an der Weinstraße.

== Description ==
Of the inner ward (lower ward) on the sandstone rocks, the ruins of the fortified palas, the castle gateway of the inner ward (upper ward) and the shield wall have survived.

== Legend ==
According to one legend, the castle was built by an evil knight, Caspar, whom the local population called "Wild Caspar". He and the daughter of the emperor were in love with one another and he wanted to hide her in the castle with him. Because no-one knew of the existence and location of the castle, he invited all the tradesmen who had built the castle to a feast in a hut. When they had all fallen asleep, replete and drunk, Caspar set fire to the hut. All those who knew of the construction of the castle died in the fire. He took the emperor's daughter to the castle and they lived there for years. One day a pilgrim was walking through the Speyerbach valley and discovered the castle there. When he knocked on the door to ask for shelter for the night he paled on seeing the emperor's daughter when she opened the door. He was invited inside and treated royally. He and Wild Caspar complained about the emperor. The next morning the pilgrim wanted to be on his way, but Caspar blindfolded him and rode him himself out of the valley so that the pilgrim could not discover the way there. But the pilgrim was the emperor himself. He called up his army and marched up the Speyerbach valley to Spangenberg Castle. Just before could seize the castle, Caspar and the emperor's daughter threw themselves from the castle walls into the depths of the valley. They wanted to die together and escape retribution. As they fell their robes acted like parachutes and they landed uninjured. They were arrested by the emperor. Caspar was sentenced to death by hanging and his daughter was married by the emperor to another man.

== Literature ==
- Jürgen Keddigkeit, Ulrich Burkhart, Rolf Übel: Pfälzisches Burgenlexikon, Vol. 4.1: O-Sp. Institut für pfälzische Geschichte und Volkskunde Kaiserslautern, Kaiserslautern, 2007, ISBN 978-3-927754-56-0, S. 505-519.
- Alexander Thon (ed.): Wie Schwalbennester an den Felsen geklebt. Burgen in der Nordpfalz. Schnell und Steiner, Regensburg, 2005, ISBN 3-7954-1674-4, pp. 146–151.
