= Legend of the Leather Bridge =

There is a legend of the Leather Bridge (German: Sage von der Ledernen Brücke) in several regions of Germany and Switzerland. The word lederne could also have meant "ladder" or "lantern".

== Palatinate ==
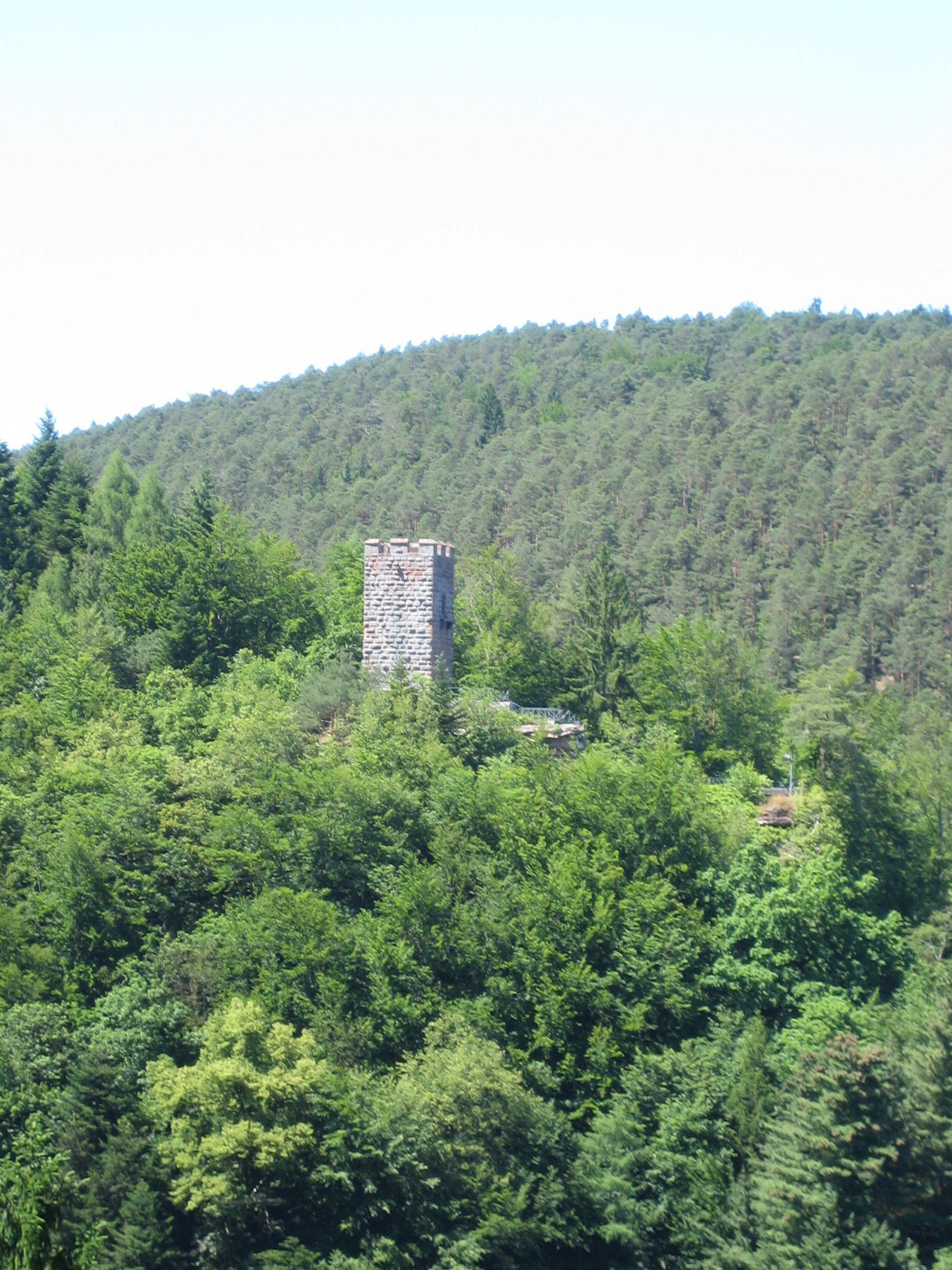
Erfenstein Castle from the south

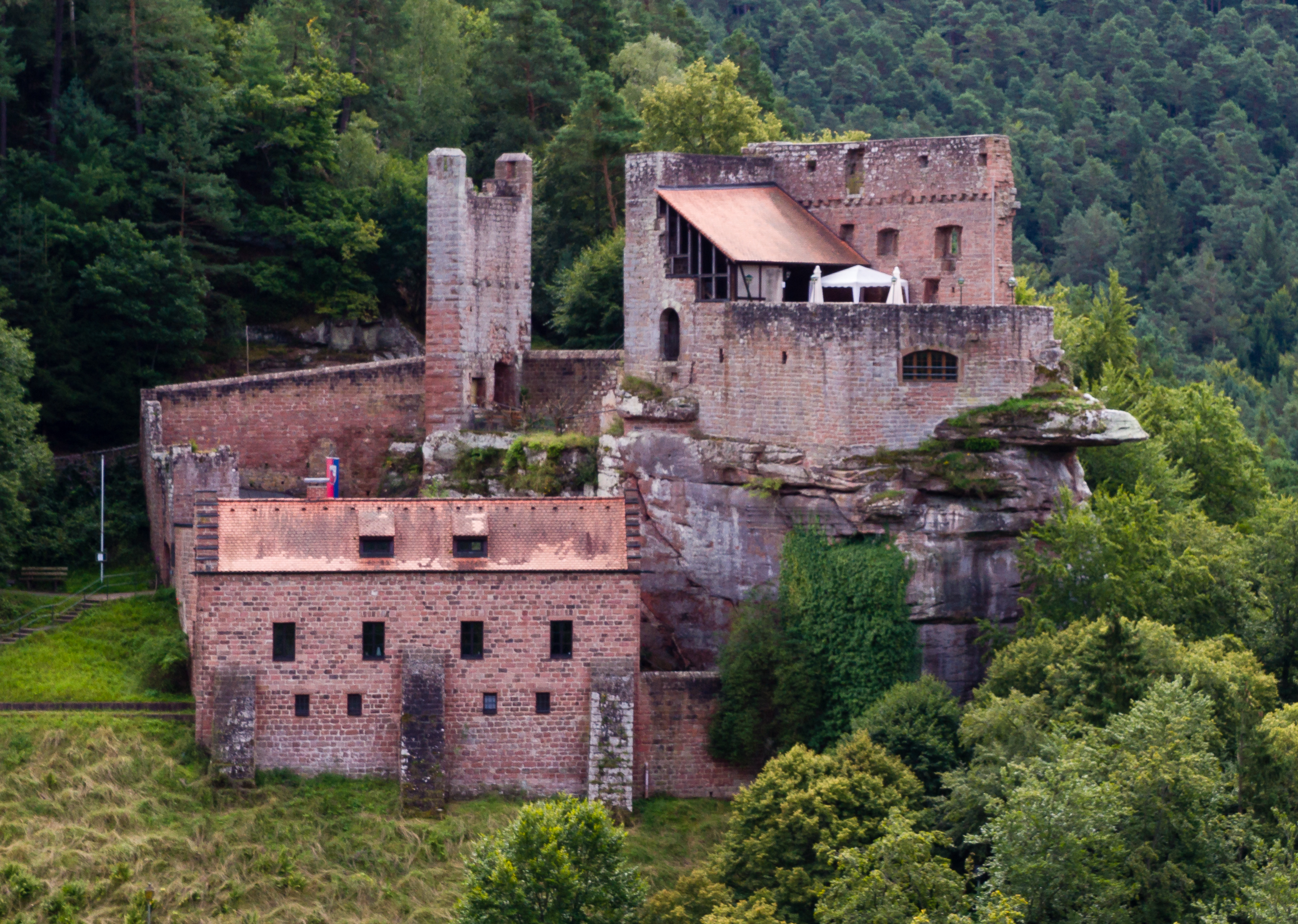
Spangenberg Castle from the north

According to legend, there was once a leather bridge crossing the Elmstein valley between the Palatine castle of Erfenstein, high above the left bank of the Speyerbach river, and a second castle, Spangenberg, on the opposite side of the valley. Two brothers, or at least two close friends, who visited each other frequently, decided to build the bridge in order to avoid having to take the difficult path through the valley between the two castles and over the then wild River Speyerbach.

Their friendship continued for many years. But one day the two lords, having feasted together at the Spangenberg again, began a heated argument. No doubt, an excess of wine had contributed to the situation. One word led to another and finally the Erfenstein lord, beside himself with rage, returned over the bridge, having shouted, "I will never come back!" Equally furious, the lord of Spangenberg roared after him, "You don't need to; I'll see to that!" And when the lord of Erfenstein reached the middle of the bridge, Spangenberg cut the leather straps with his sword. The bridge fell into the depths and the lord of Erfenstein plunged to his death. One source records that the dispute was because one lord, who was a bachelor and the golden-haired wife of his brother had fallen in love and the bridge was used for their trysts.

Ever after this murder there was bitter enmity between the owners of the two castles and they damaged one another whenever they could.

The historical background to the legend is that the two castles were always owned by different overlords – initially Spangenberg to the Speyer prince-bishop and Erfenstein to the counts of Leiningen – who in were always in competition with one another. When, later, their ownership changed, a conflict broke out, the Weißenburg Feud, between Elector Frederick I of the Palatinate and his cousin, Duke Louis I of Palatinate-Zweibrücken. As a result, both castles were destroyed in 1470; first, Erfenstein, and then, Spangenberg.

Technically, to make a bridge made of soft, sagging material such as leather would not have been practicable because the height of the castles above the floor of the valley (about one hundred metres) would not be enough to span the five hundred metres between them.

== Eifel ==
A leather bridge is supposed to have linked the two castles of Stolzenburg and Pielstein over the Urft. According to local legend, their knights lived in the lap of luxury, demanding socage from the farmers, yet allowing their children to play skittles along the bridge with loaves of bread, whilst the subjects were dying of hunger. God himself is said to have destroyed both castles by unleashing a natural disaster.

== Sauerland ==
Near Arnsberg legend has it that the devil made a leather bridge between the castles of Rüdenburg and Arnsberg in order to provide an escape route for the beleaguered lord of Rüdenburg and his men. This was done in gratitude for the hospitality that the Rüdenburgers had previously unwittingly shown the devil.

== Nördlinger Ries ==
In the valley of Kartäusertal, on the southern edge of the Nördlinger Ries there was supposed to have been a leather bridge between the three sister castles of Rauhaus, Hochhaus and Niederhaus. According to legend, whoever "cut the leather bridge" would have his castle swallowed up by the earth.

It is assumed that the lederne Brücke in this story, actually means a "bridge of lights", in other words that there was a communication link between the castles that was maintained using light signals. When, one day, Rauhaus Castle became unoccupied, the light bridge was interrupted. The castle was then plundered by the local populace and slighted; it was thus practically "swallowed by the earth".

== Thuringia ==
In Mellingen on the River Ilm southeast of Weimar there were once two castles: one on the Kapellenberg hill and the Heinrichsburg, both of which were probably destroyed during the Saxon Fratricidal War. Both castles, separated by about 1.5 kilometres, were supposed to have been connected by a leather bridge. Especially in the older literature (around 1900) it is posited that this legend is a mythological reference to Edda.

== Vogtland ==
Near Elsterberg on the White Elster are the ruins of Elsterberg Castle. A leather bridge is supposed to have joined the old castle over a distance of several hundred metres to the newer buildings.

== Lower Lusatia ==
An evil Wendish prince, or according to other Sorbian legends a Wendish king called Prebislav in the 10th century, is supposed to have lived in a castle in the Teufelslauch northeast of Friedland in the direction of the village of Reudnitz. In order to pursue his crimes as a robber knight, he left the castle over a leather bridge that he rolled out in front of him and rolled up behind him. When he robbed a man who was in league with the devil, the devil whipped up a mighty thunderstorm. A lightning bolt killed the prince and the floods caused the castle to sink into the ground. All that remains are the water-filled depressions of the Teufelslauch ("Devil's Hole").

== Switzerland ==
In Wileroltigen a tale is told of tunnels, a leather bridge and a stone grave. The castle of Oltigen and the castle of Wileroltigen were first mentioned in 1006. Along with Hugo of Mümpelgard (Montbéliard), Count of Oltigen they came to an evil end in May 1410, according to Conrad Justinger.
