= Brogberg =

Hill in the Palatine Forest in Germany

- Location within Rhineland-Palatinate

Highest point
- Elevation: 567 m above sea level (NN) (1,860 ft)
- Coordinates: 49°19′51″N 7°53′46″E

Geography
- Location: Bad Dürkheim, Rhineland-Palatinate, Germany
- Parent range: Pfälzerwald

The Brogberg is a hill, 567 metres high, in the Palatine Forest in Germany. It is located west of Iggelbach, a village in the municipality of Elmstein. Northeast of the hill rises the Iggelbach stream, a left tributary of the Helmbach. The Brogberg lies entirely within the territory of the municipality of Elmstein.

== Maps ==
- Topographic map, 1:50,000 series, issued by the State Survey Office of Rhineland-Palatinate (Landesvermessungsamt Rheinland-Pfalz), 1993
- Brogberg in the landscape information system of the Rhineland-Palatinate Conservation Authority (Naturschutzverwaltung Rheinland-Pfalz)
