= Esthal =

- Municipality
- Coat of arms

- Location of Esthal within Bad Dürkheim district
- Interactive map of Esthal
- Location within Germany Location within Rhineland-Palatinate
- Coordinates: 49°23′N 07°59′E
- Country: Germany
- State: Rhineland-Palatinate
- District: Bad Dürkheim
- Municipal assoc.: Lambrecht (Pfalz)
- Subdivisions: 4

Government
  - Mayor (2019–24): Gernot Kuhn (CDU)

Area
  - Total: 15.51 km^{2} (5.99 sq mi)
- Elevation: 363 m (1,191 ft)

Population (2025-12-31)
  - Total: 1,325
  - Density: 85.43/km^{2} (221.3/sq mi)
- Time zone: UTC+01:00 (CET)
  - Summer (DST): UTC+02:00 (CEST)
- Postal codes: 67472
- Dialling codes: 06325
- Vehicle registration: DÜW
- Website: www.esthal.de

Esthal is an Ortsgemeinde – a municipality belonging to a Verbandsgemeinde, a kind of collective municipality – in the Bad Dürkheim district in Rhineland-Palatinate, Germany.

== Geography ==
=== Location ===
The municipality lies on a plateau in the Palatinate Forest. It belongs to the Verbandsgemeinde of Lambrecht, whose seat is in the like-named town.

=== Constituent communities ===
Esthal's Ortsteile, or Annexen, as they are known, are Esthal, Breitenstein, Erfenstein and Sattelmühle.

== History ==
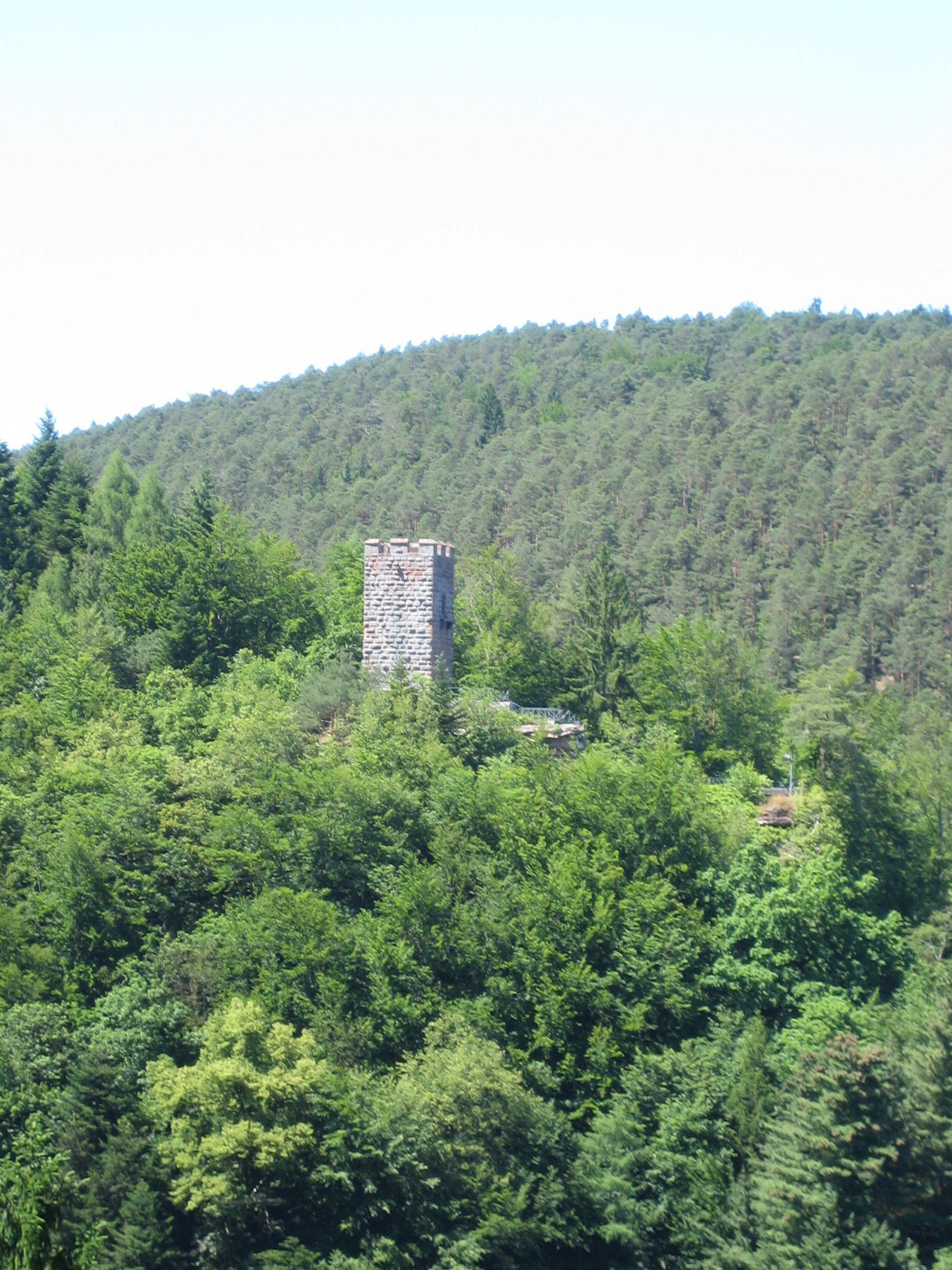
Erfenstein Castle

In 1380, Esthal had its first documentary mention as Estall. It was held until 1794 by the Lords of Erfenstein, whose seat was at the nearby castle.

=== Religion ===
In 2007, 71% of the inhabitants were Catholic and 17% Evangelical. The rest practised other faiths or none.

== Politics ==
=== Municipal council ===
The council is made up of 16 council members, who were elected at the municipal election held on 7 June 2009, and the honorary mayor as chairman.

The municipal election held on 7 June 2009 yielded the following results:

	SPD	CDU	FWG	Total
2009	3	8	5	16 seats
2004	3	9	4	16 seats

=== Coat of arms ===
The German blazon reads: Unter silbernem Schildhaupt in Schwarz ein schwebendes kugelbesetztes goldenes Tatzenkreuz.

The municipality's arms might in English heraldic language be described thus: Under a chief argent sable a cross pattée couped, the lower arm longer than the others, and in each end a roundle Or.

The arms were approved in 1954 by the Mainz Ministry of the Interior and they date from a 1772 court seal.

== Culture and sightseeing ==
- On the village's outskirts is found Saint Mary's Convent (Kloster St. Maria) of the Niederbronn Sisters, which was built in 1951-1959, and which functions as a provincial mother house. The building was planned by the architect Hebgen (Ludwigshafen), and the church was consecrated on 7 March 1959. Worth mentioning as an unusual piece of decoration is a cross, now found in the church's chancel, that was acquired from a private owner in Switzerland and that holds importance for art history. The greater part of the rest of the décor was newly created in 1986 by Josef Henger.
- In the village centre stands the Catholic Saint Konrad's Church (Kirche St. Konrad or sometimes Bruder-Konrad-Kirche) built in 1933 and 1934, whose nave joins onto the former Baroque church (Saint Catherine's, or St. Katharina). The church was built to plans by architects Schönwetter and Schaltenbrand (Neustadt), who in turn were influenced by Albert Boßlet. The consecration date is 23 September 1934. The windows and the chancel décor stem in the main from Günter Zeuner. In the Baroque part of the church is found a Classicist high altar by Bernhard Würschmitt from about 1825.
- In the area around Esthal are several historic washing fountains.
- Within Esthal's limits stands Erfenstein Castle (Burg Erfenstein), and across the dale, just inside Neustadt an der Weinstraße is Spangenberg Castle (Burg Spangenberg).
- A further castle ruin is to be found in the outlying centre of Breitenstein.
- Near the ruins of Erfenstein Castle, in the eponymous Ortsteil, there is a halt on the Little Cuckoo Railway (Kuckucksbähnel). This is a heritage railway running between Neustadt an der Weinstraße and Elmstein.

== Sources ==
- Gemeinde Esthal (Hrsg.), Geschichte des Walddorfes Esthal, 1980
- Niederbronner Schwestern (Hrsg.), Provinz Pfalz 1951-2001, 2001
