= Erfenstein Castle =

Castle in Germany

- Burg Erfenstein
- Esthal-Erfenstein
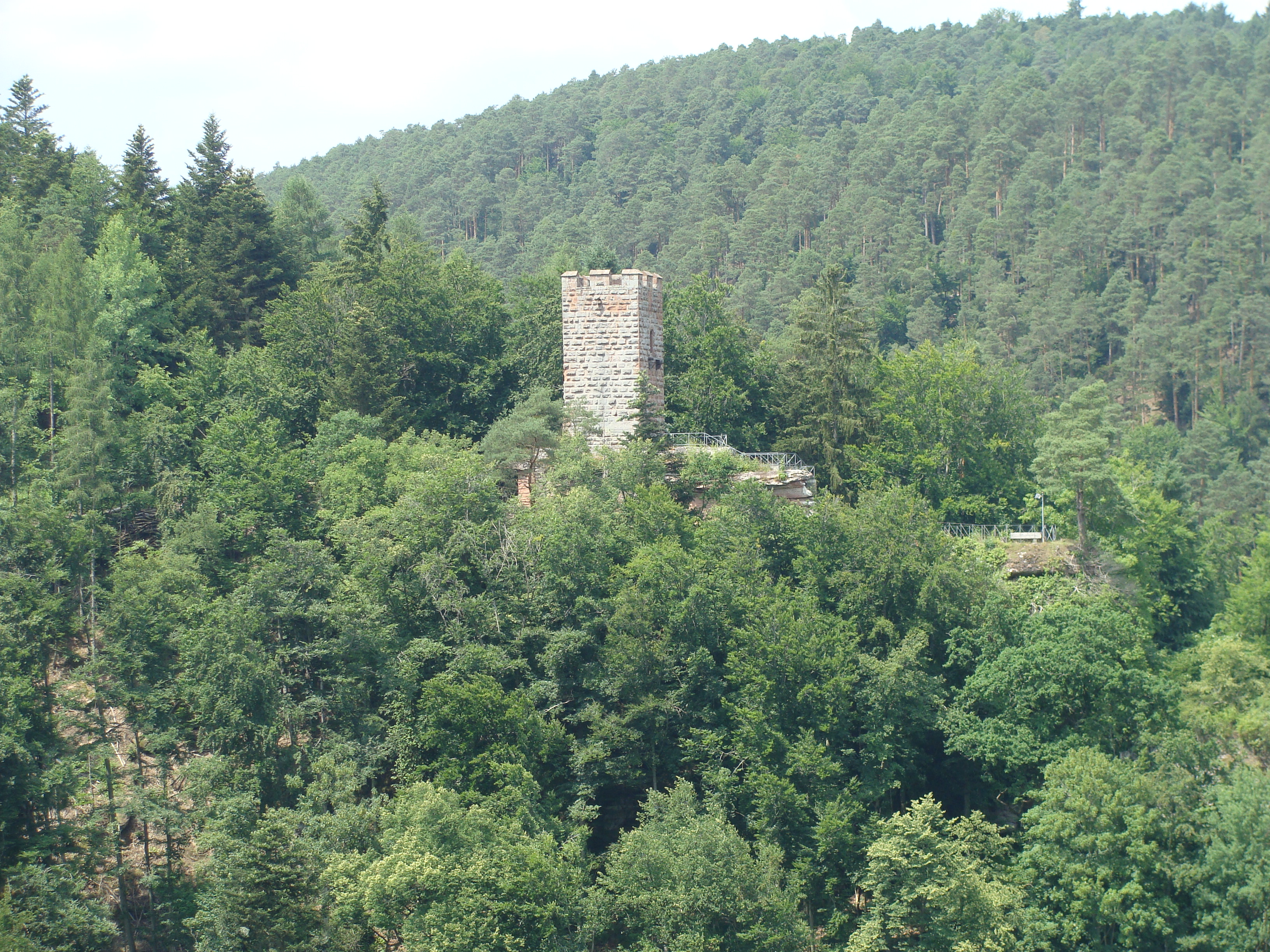
- The ruins of Erfenstein from the opposite side of the valley

Site information
- Type: hill castle, spur castle
- Code: DE-RP
- Condition: ruin

Location
- Coordinates: 49°21′12″N 8°00′50″E
- Height: 265 m above sea level (NN)

Site history
- Built: before 1272
- Materials: rusticated ashlar

Garrison information
- Occupants: ministeriales

Erfenstein Castle (German: Burg Erfenstein) is a medieval spur castle in the German state of Rhineland-Palatinate. It lies within the Palatine Forest above the Elmstein Valley at 265 m above sea level (NN) in the vicinity of the hamlet of Erfenstein in the municipality of Esthal (county of Bad Dürkheim). Together with nearby Spangenberg Castle, it is linked to the legend of the Leather Bridge.

== History ==
When and by whose instigation Erfenstein was founded is not known for certain; however its builders were the Leiningen counts on whose land Erfenstein lay. The castle was probably established to protect the extensive tracts of forest owned by the House of Leiningen in the surrounding area.

In 1272 the first record of the castle mentions a ministerialis, Bock of Erfenstein, who was a descendant of the lesser nobility in the Leiningen Land and who lived at the castle with his family. In 1439 specific rights were granted by deed to Siegfried Bock of Erfenstein, clearly a descendant of Bock, in the parish of Dirmstein.

The castle's ownership switched between the two lines of the House of Leiningen, the Leiningen-Hardenburg and Leiningen-Rixingen branches, as a result of inheritance and division. The Rixingen line held the castle together with the village of Esthal until 1345; thereafter it became a Ganerbenburg or castle owned by joint inheritance. After numerous disputes amongst the joint owners the castle went to the counts of Sponheim in 1415. When their family died out, ownership of the castle went back to the Leiningen-Hardenburgs.

The historic background to the legend is that both castles were always owned by different lords - to begin with the Spangenberg belonged to the prince-bishops of Speyer and Erfenstein, as mentioned, to the Leiningens - who were in competition with one another. In 1470 when their owners had subsequently changed, both castles were destroyed - first Erfenstein and then the Spangenberg - by their opponents during the Weißenburg Feud between Elector Frederick I of the Palatinate and his cousin, Duke Louis I of Palatinate-Zweibrücken. Erfenstein has since lain in ruins.

== Description ==
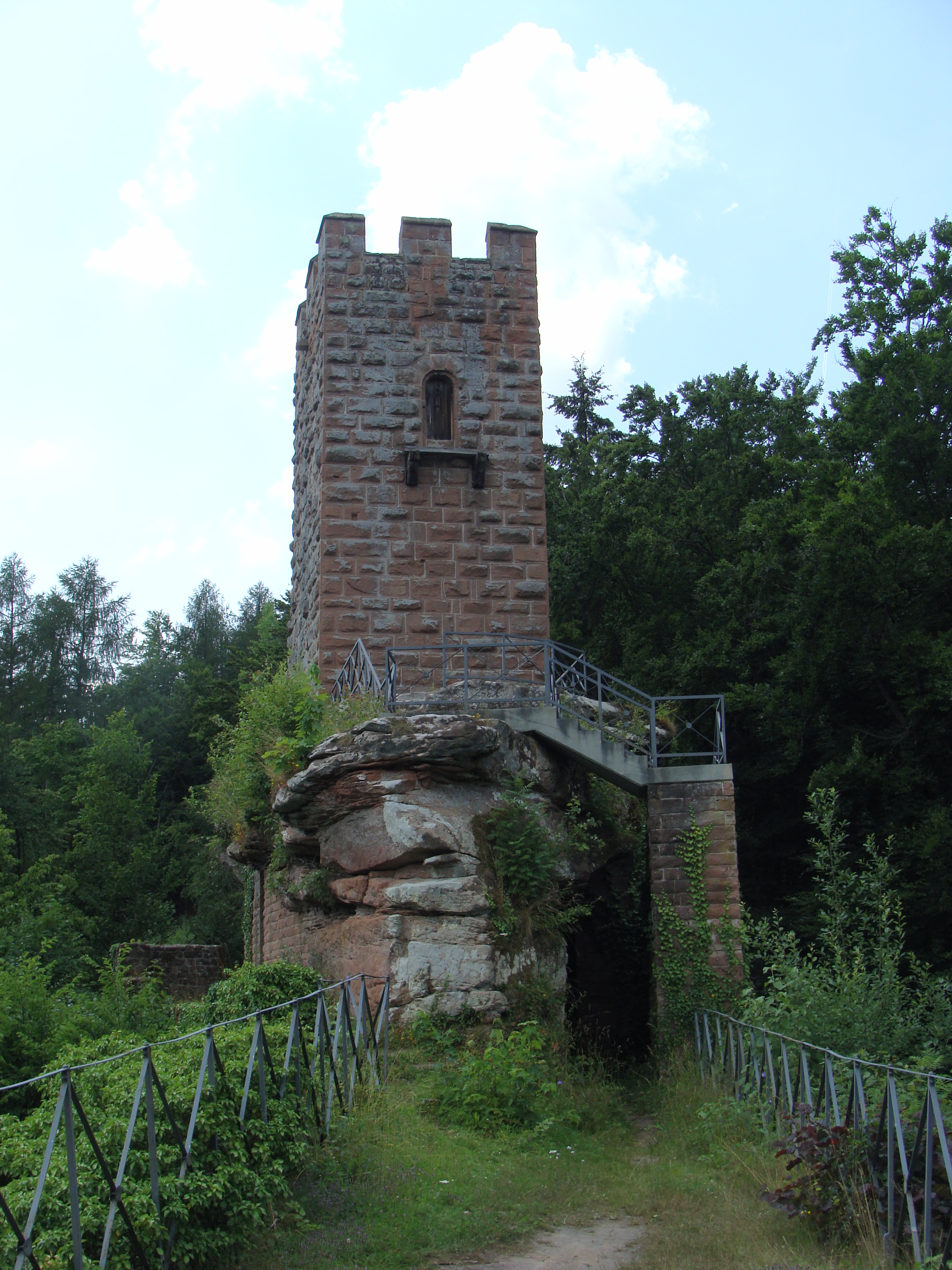

Erfenstein consists of two sites: Old Erfenstein (Alt-Erfenstein) and New Erfenstein (Neu-Erfenstein). Of the older site, which lies above New Erfenstein, practically nothing has survived apart from the outer neck ditch that is almost entirely filled with earth and - on an eight-metre-high rock – several rusticated ashlars of a once square bergfried.

The lower and more recent site is dominated by a very well preserved bergfried, whose entrance lies high on the eastern side. Beside it are remains of a curtain wall. Right-angled sockets, which would have supported the ends of wooden beams, indicate that it had two or more internal floor levels. Old and New Erfenstein are separated from one another by a wide (inner) neck ditch. At the foot of the sandstone rock on which New Erfenstein stands there was also a lower ward (Unterburg) of which a few surviving elements can be seen.

Unlike Spangenberg Castle opposite, the site is in a poor condition, apart from the remnants of the lower ward. Measures have been proposed to secure the ruins in the area of the upper ward and the two neck ditches. Rapid deterioration of the site, especially the stump of the tower of the upper ward, is occurring, due to vegetation and the climbing of rocks and ruins by visitors.

== Literature ==
- Jürgen Keddigkeit, Alexander Thon, Karl Scheurer Rolf Übel: Pfälzisches Burgenlexikon, Vol. 1: A-E. 2nd edn., Institut für pfälzische Geschichte und Volkskunde Kaiserslautern, Kaiserslautern, 2003, ISBN 3-927754-51-X, pp. 504–516.
- Alexander Thon (ed.): Wie Schwalbennester an den Felsen geklebt. Burgen in der Nordpfalz. 1st edn., Schnell und Steiner, Regensburg, 2005, ISBN 3-7954-1674-4, pp. 44–47.
- Walter Herrmann: Auf rotem Fels - Ein Führer zu den schönsten Burgen der Pfalz und des elsässischen Wasgau. DRW-Verlag, Leinfelden-Echterdingen, 2004, ISBN 3-7650-8286-4, pp. 50–51.
- Alexander Thon, „Es ist keine Kunde auf uns gekommen, von welchem Beherrscher des teutschen Reiches dieselbe erbaut worden sei …“. Anmerkungen zu Ermittlung und Bewertung der Ersterwähnung pfälzischer Burgen, in: Mythos Staufer – in memoriam Dankwart Leistikow – Akten der 5. Landauer Staufertagung 1–3 July 2005, ed. by Volker Herzner u. Jürgen Krüger, Speyer, 2010, pp 127–139, hier pp. 128ff (about its first recorded mention in 1189/93). ISBN 3-932155-27-0.
