= Palatinate Forest =

Low mountain range in Germany

Coordinates: 49°17′33″N 7°52′36″E

Palatinate Forest Pfälzerwald (German) Pälzerwald (Palatine German)
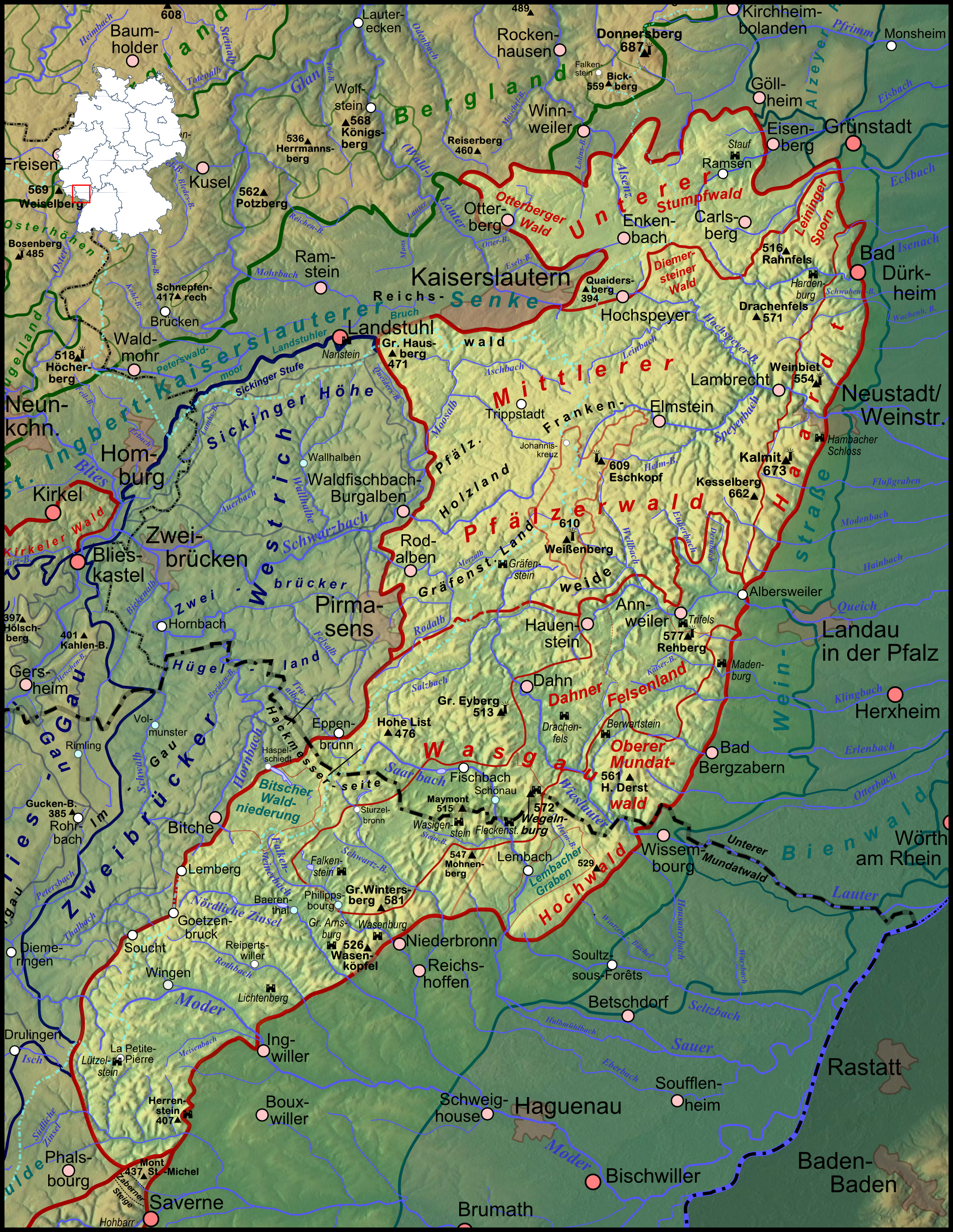
- The Palatinate Forest in southwest Germany and northeast France (delineated in red)
- Interactive map of Palatinate Forest

Geography
- Location: Palatinate, Germany

Administration
- Established: 1998
- Website: www.pfaelzerwald.de

The Palatinate Forest (/pəˈlætɪnɪt/; German: Pfälzerwald [ˈpfɛltsɐvalt]), sometimes also called the Palatine Forest, is a low-mountain region in southwestern Germany, located in the Palatinate in the state of Rhineland-Palatinate. The forest is a designated nature park (German: Naturpark Pfälzerwald) covering 1,771 km^{2} and its highest elevation is the Kalmit (672.6 m).

Together with the northern part of the adjacent Vosges Mountains in France it forms the UNESCO-designated Palatinate Forest-North Vosges Biosphere Reserve.

== Geography ==
=== Topography ===
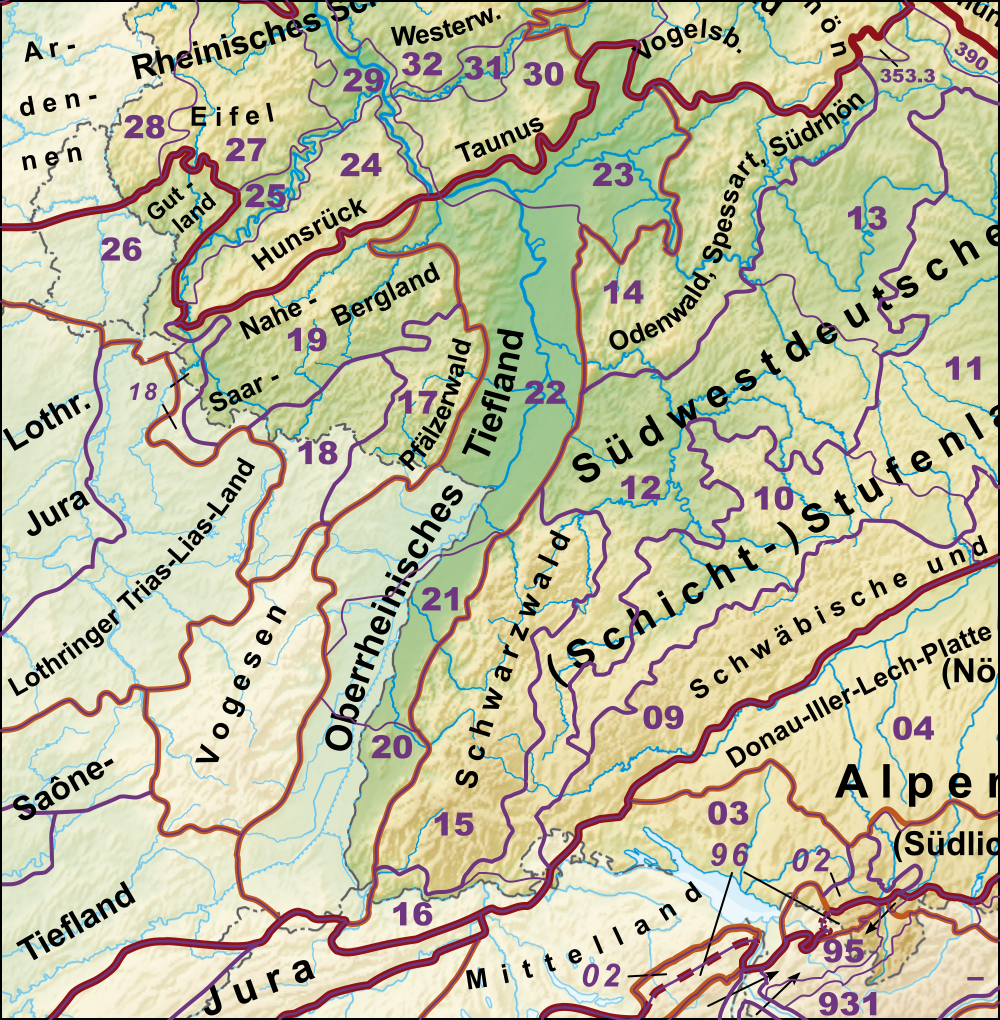
The scarplands west of the Rhine and the Palatine Forest (17)

The Palatinate Forest, together with the Vosges south of the French border, from which it has no morphological separation, is part of a single central upland region of about 8,000 km^{2} in area, that runs from the Börrstadt Basin (a line from Winnweiler via Börrstadt and Göllheim) to the Burgundian Gate (on the line Belfort–Ronchamp–Lure) and which forms the western boundary of the Upper Rhine Plain. This landscape forms, in turn, the eastern part of the very extensive eastern scarplands of France, which, on German soil, take in large parts of the Palatinate and the Saarland, with older (e.g. on the Donnersberg) and younger strata (muschelkalk, e.g. the Westrich Plateau).

=== Boundaries ===
While the boundaries of the Palatinate Forest are comparatively clearly defined to the north and east, the transition to neighbouring landscapes to the west and south is less sharp.

To the north, the Palatinate Forest is adjoined by the North Palatine Uplands, including the Donnersberg (686.5 m). This is where the bunter sandstone formations typical of the Palatinate Forest end, being replaced by other types of rock such as those of the Rotliegendes. This results in a clear geomorphological separation of the two landscape areas, which runs approximately along a line from Eisenberg via Göllheim and Börrstadt to Otterberg near Kaiserslautern.

The hill country between the Haardt and the Upper Rhine Plain, where Palatine wines are grown, is known as the Weinstrasse. The German Wine Route runs through this zone of hills.

The St. Ingbert-Kaiserslauten Depression runs up to the northwestern Palatinate Forest from west-southwest to east-northeast into which the Forest descends in a clear escarpment, especially into the boggy lowland of the Landstuhl Bruch west of Kaiserslautern.

To the west of the Großer Hausberg, the Westrich Plateau separates from the Palatinate Forest at the sharp southern boundary of the Landstuhler Bruch in a comparatively smooth transition. It reaches comparable heights in the transition area, but as a muschelkalk plateau it has a significantly different relief and is no longer fully forested. It not only stretches around the western edge of the Palatinate Forest, but also further south around the Vosges. From the area of Lemberg in Lorraine, it also forms the watershed between the Moselle and the Upper Rhine; the southern part of the region being drained completely via the Moder system to the Upper Rhine.

To the south, the narrow Zaberner Steige forms a border between the Palatinate Forest, which continues into France as the North Vosges (Vosges du Nord or Nordvogesen) and the "actual" Vosges. Geomorphologically and geologically, this dividing line is less pronounced than is the case on the right bank of the Rhine, where the Odenwald and Black Forest are clearly separated from each other by the lowland of the Kraichgau. Only the Burgundian Gate beyond the Vosges forms an orographically clear border on the left bank of the Rhine.

=== Structure ===
The Palatinate Forest can be divided into three areas.

- The Northern Palatinate Forest, bounded by the extensive northern Palatine hill landscape and reaching southwards to a line from Kaiserslautern to Bad Duerkheim
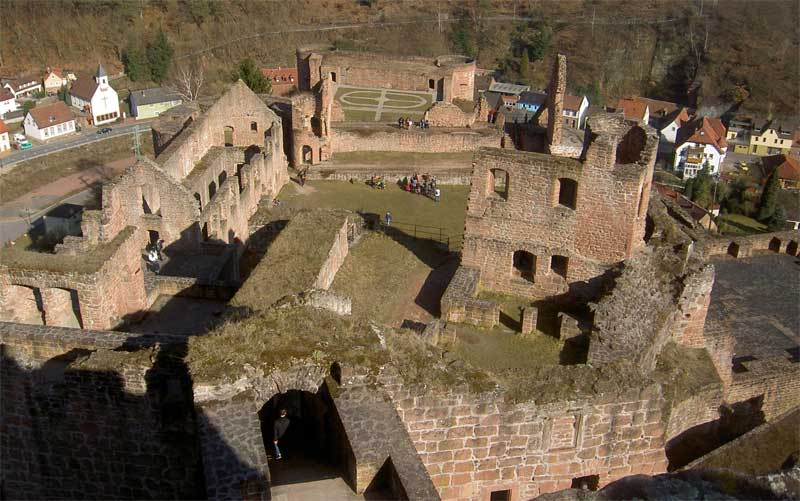
Hardenburg Castle near Bad Dürkheim

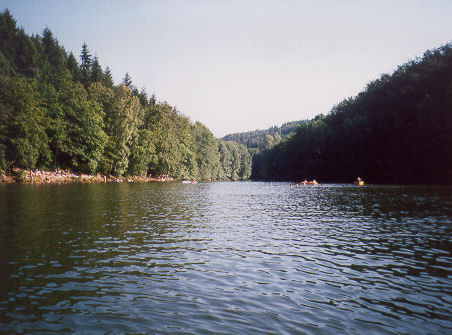
Lake Eiswoog, Ramsen

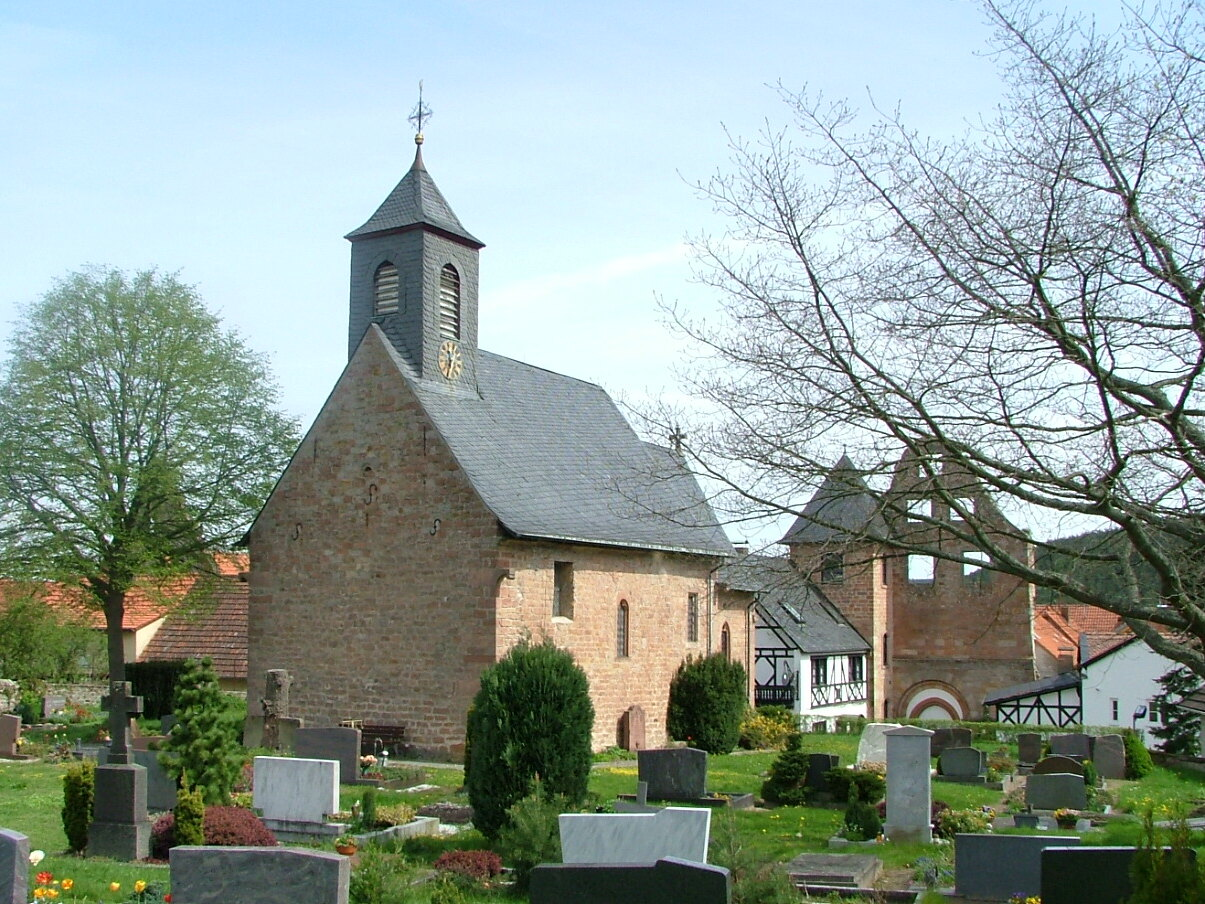
St. James' Church, ruins of Höningen Abbey (1120–1569)

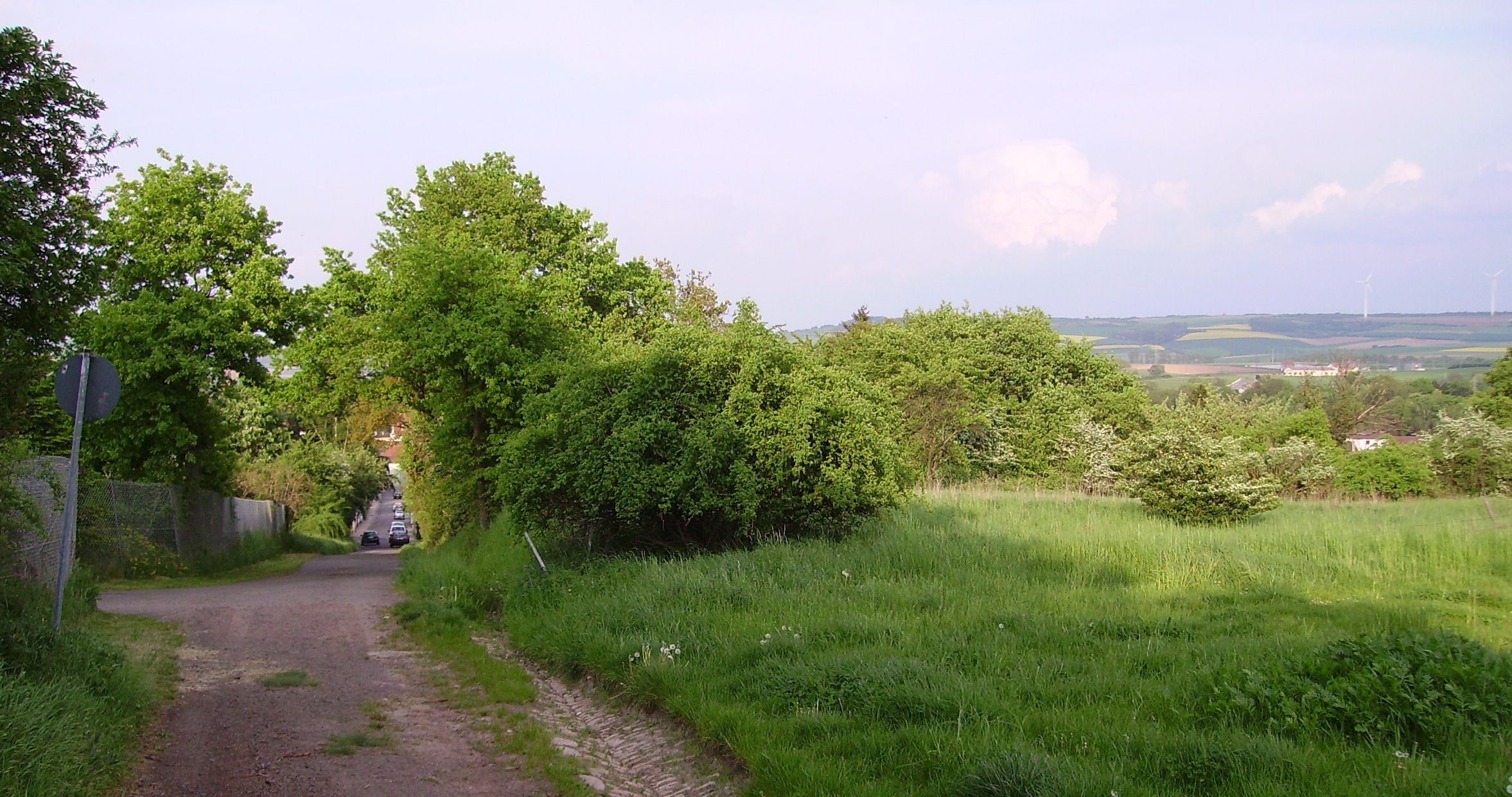
The countryside near Eisenberg
- The Middle Palatinate Forest from the Isenach stream and the line Kaiserslautern–Bad Dürkheim to the Queich stream and the line from Pirmasens to Landau
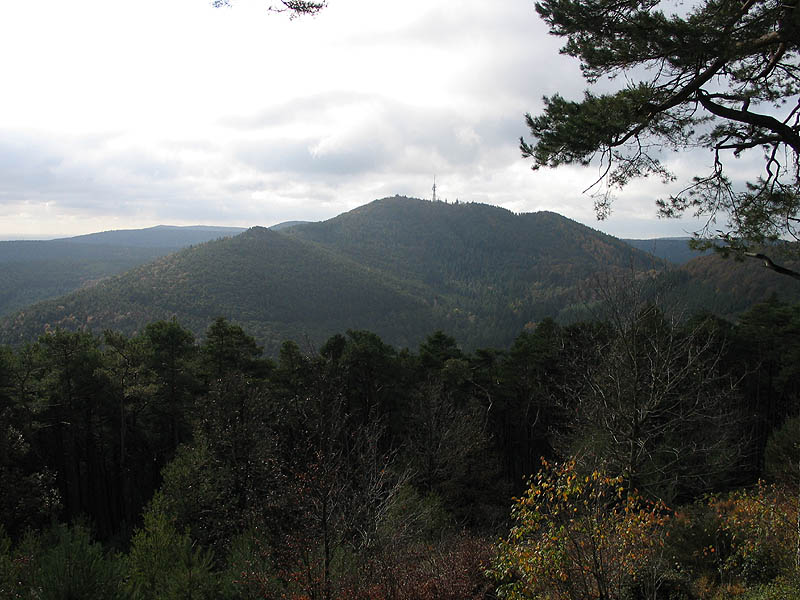
Highest peak: Kalmit (673 m)

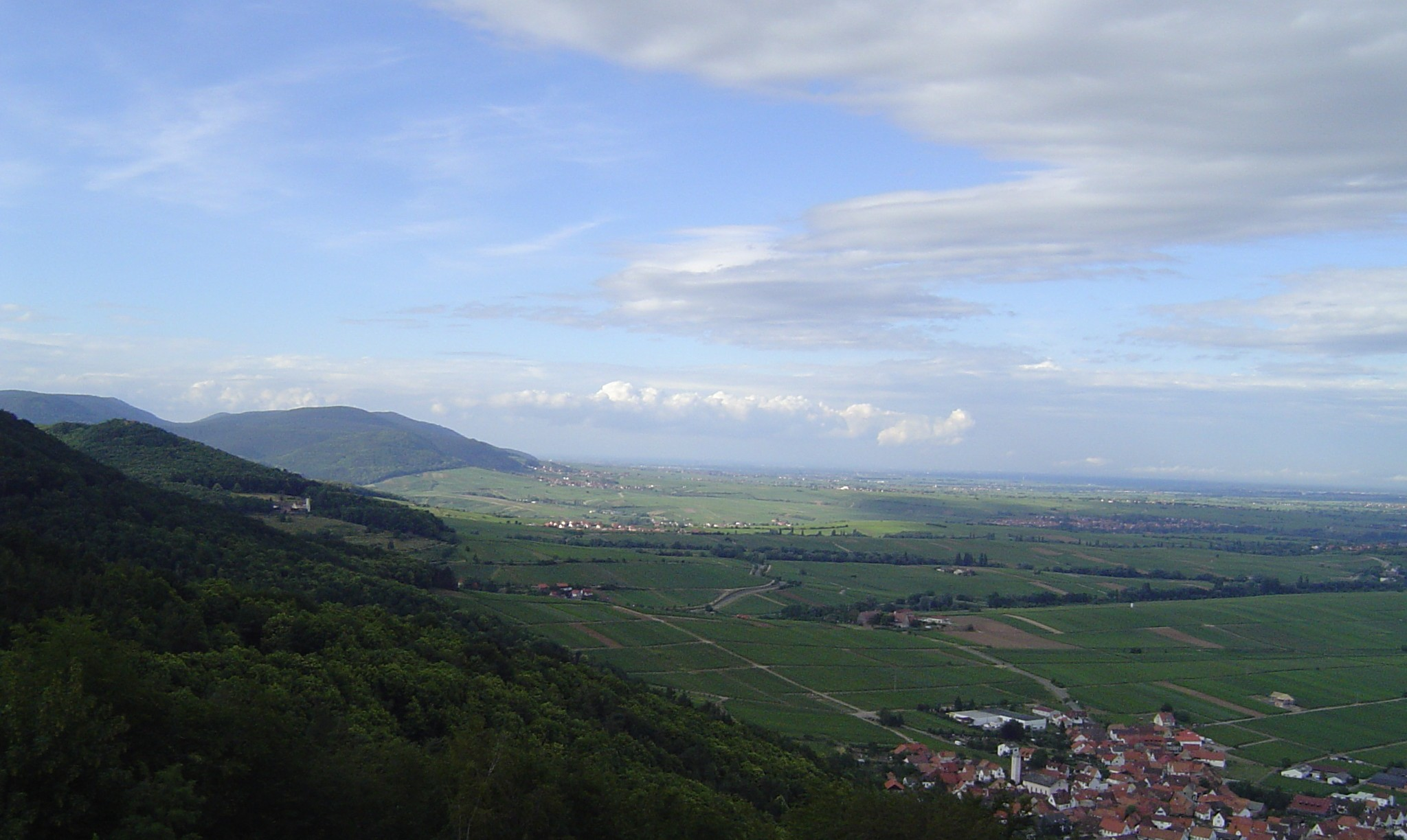
The Haardt, the boundary with the wine growing region

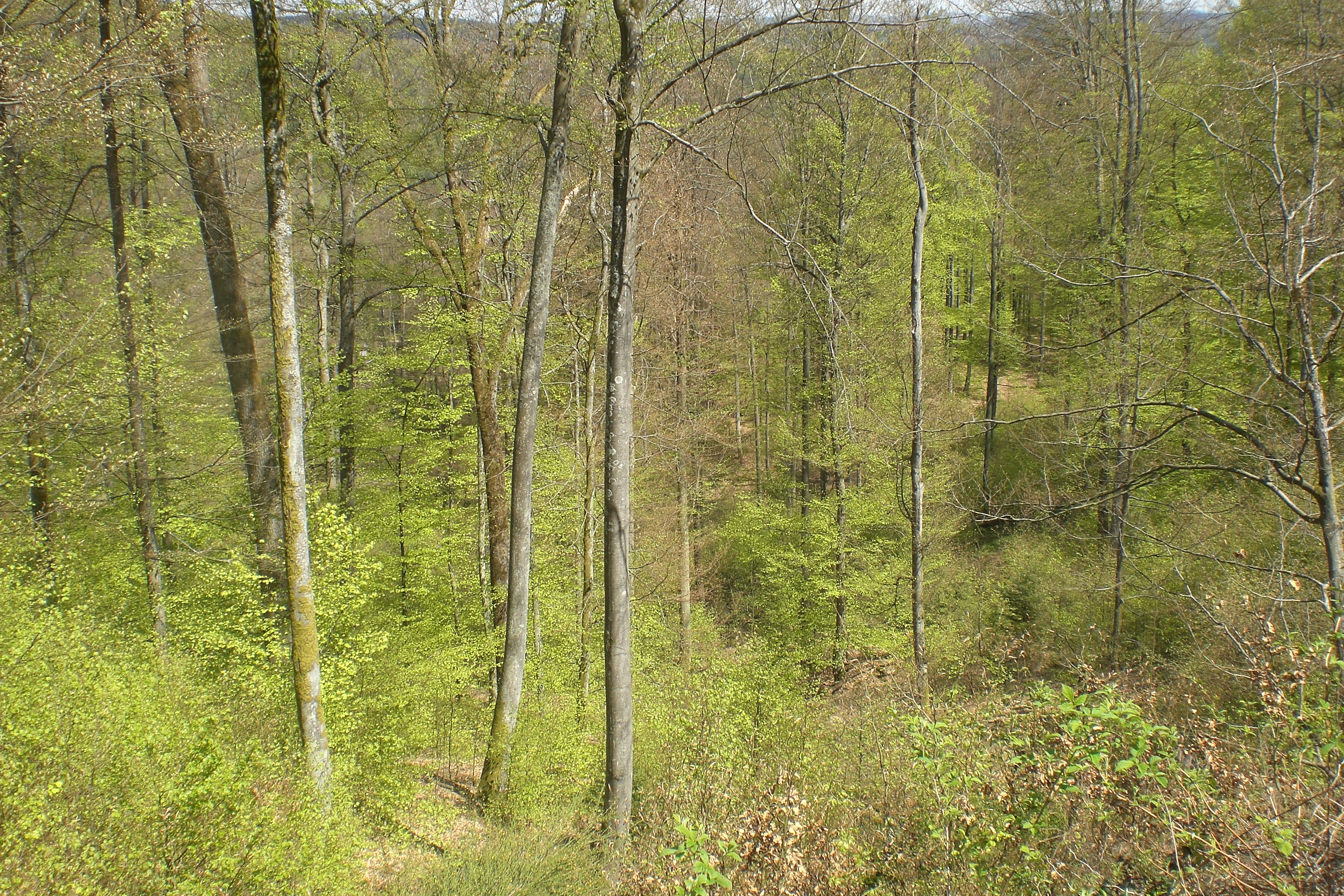
The forest in early spring

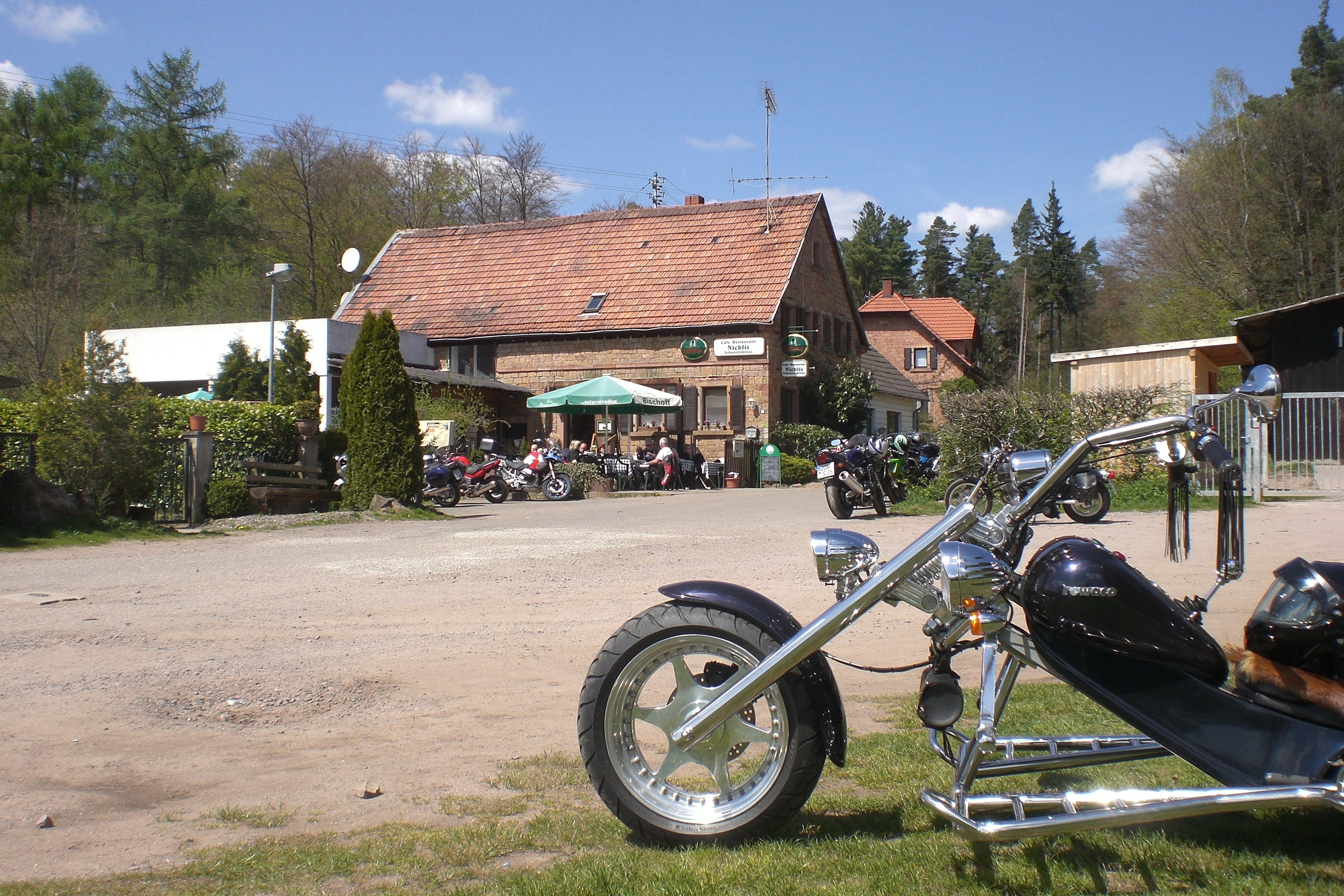
The region is much appreciated by motorcyclists
- The Southern Palatinate Forest, the so-called Wasgau, from the Queich stream and the line from Pirmasens to Landau to the French borderline in the south.
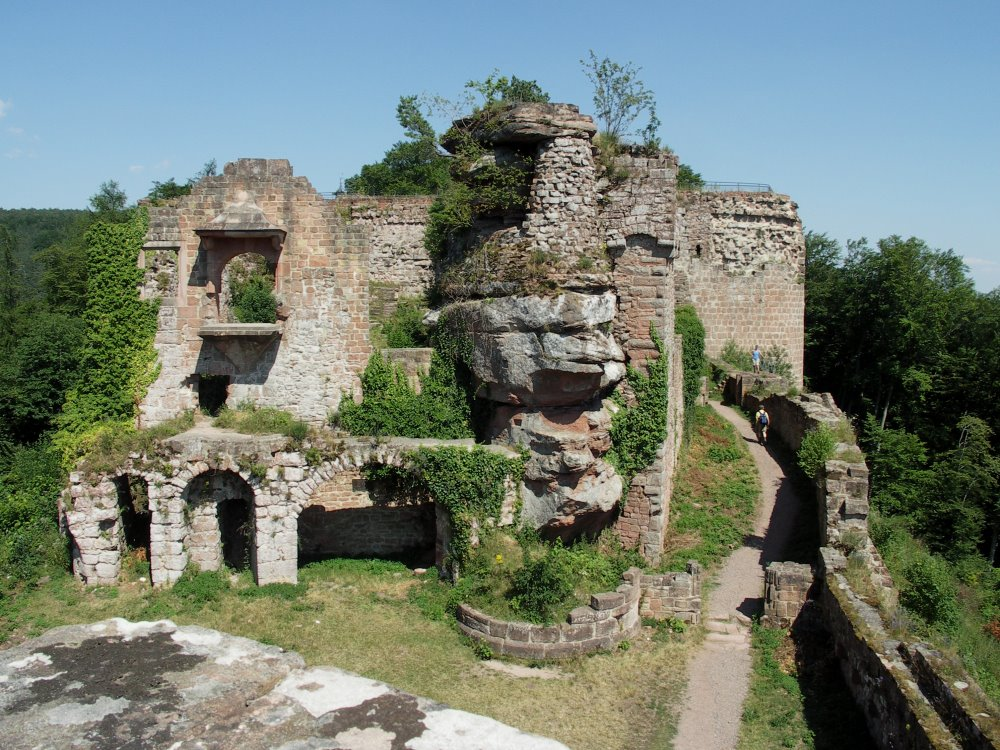
Neuscharfeneck Castle

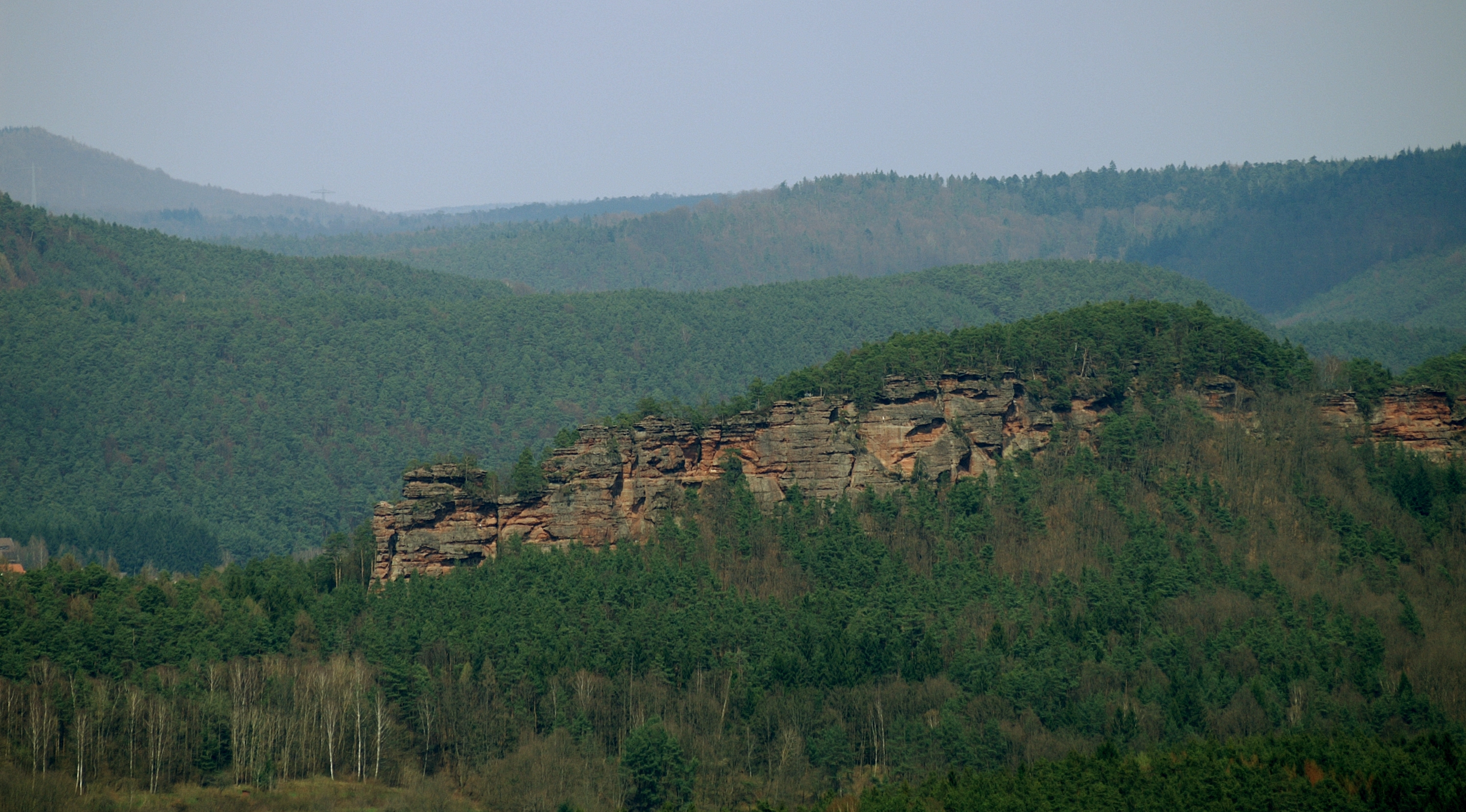
The Hochstein sandstone rocks near Dahn are a destination for rock climbers

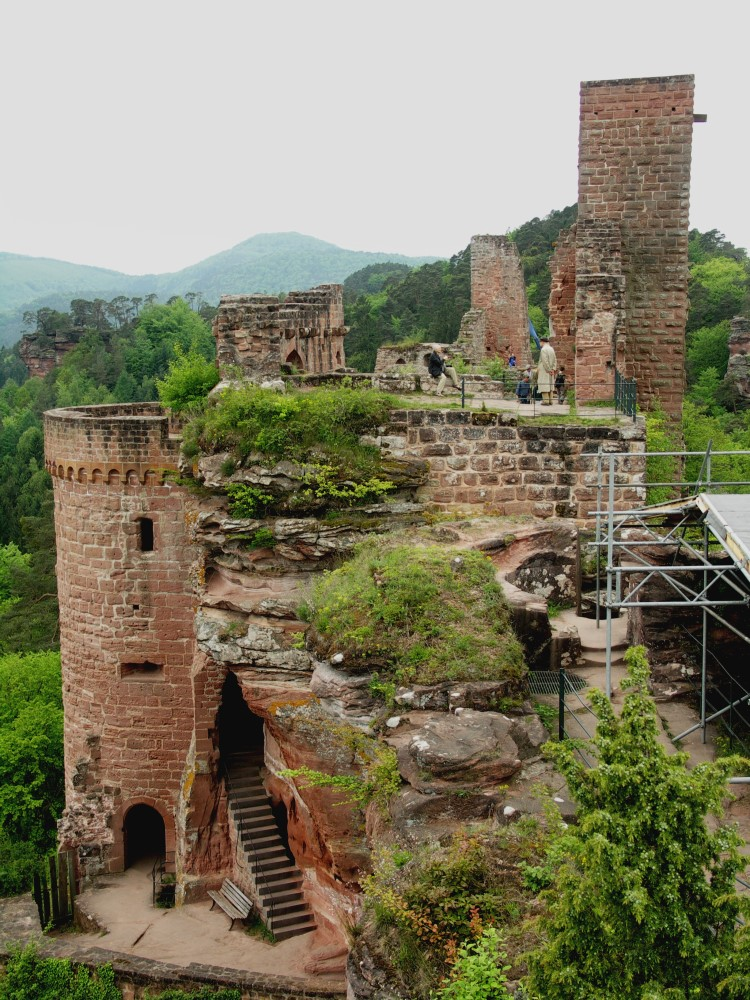
Altdahn Castle

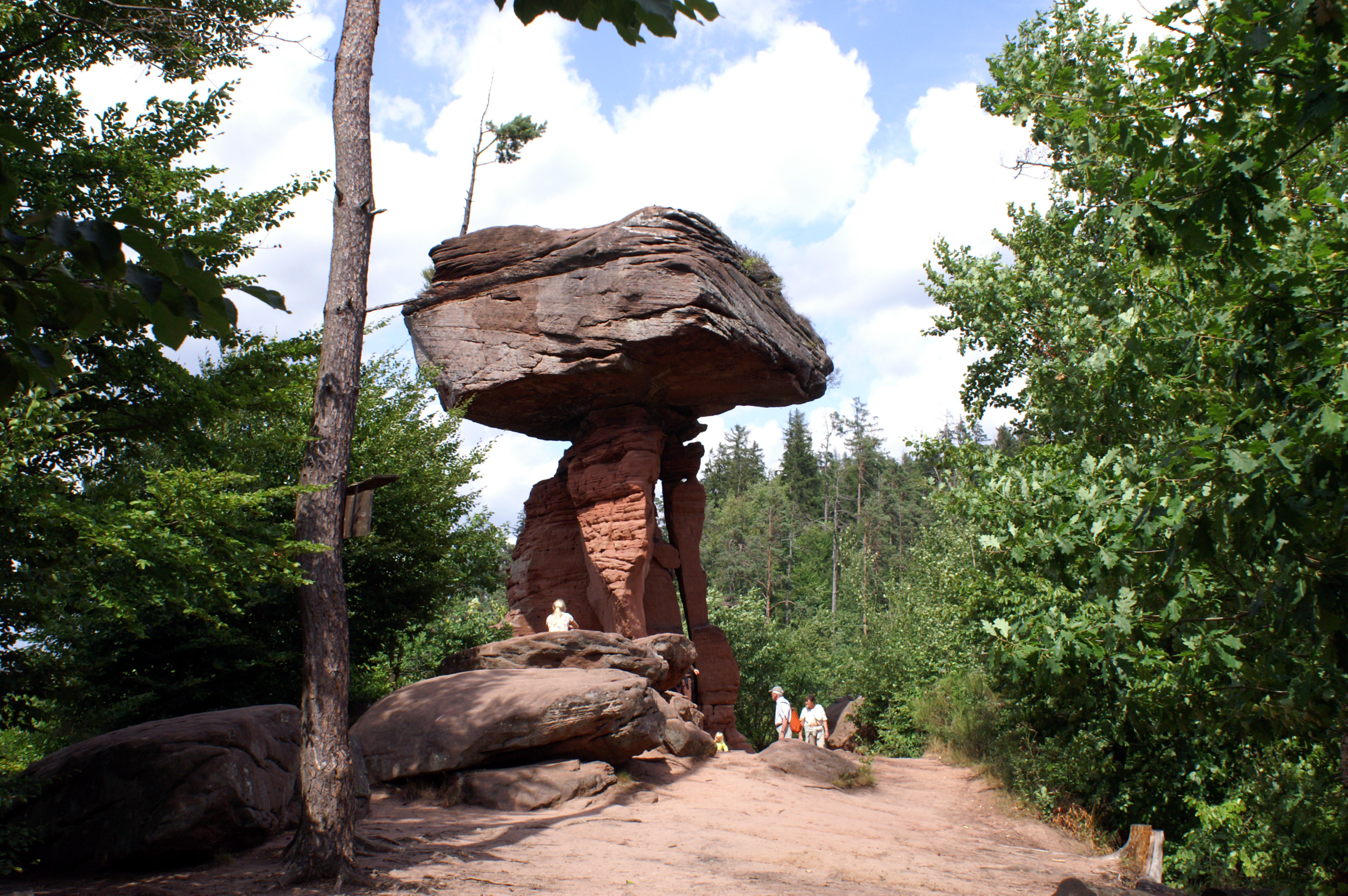
The Teufelstisch ("devil's table") near Hinterweidenthal

=== Subdivisions ===
The Palatinate Forest is a major (3rd level) natural region within the Palatine-Saarland Scarplands (a 2nd order major region) and runs south as far as the Col de Saverne, i.e. far into French territory, where it continues as the Vosges ridge. This often goes unrecognized as a result of the French border; hence the French southern part of the natural region is often, wrongly, counted as part of the North Vosges.

The important subdivisions of these bunter sandstone mountains were drawn up in the 1950s and 1960s in the Handbook of the Natural Region Divisions of Germany and 1:200,000 map sheets by the German Federal Institute for Regional Studies. Despite that, some deviation in the names used by the handbook has prevailed.

The most important subordinate landscapes are listed with the aid of a map; the map only showing the names of well-known landscapes and only the more significant landscape boundaries.

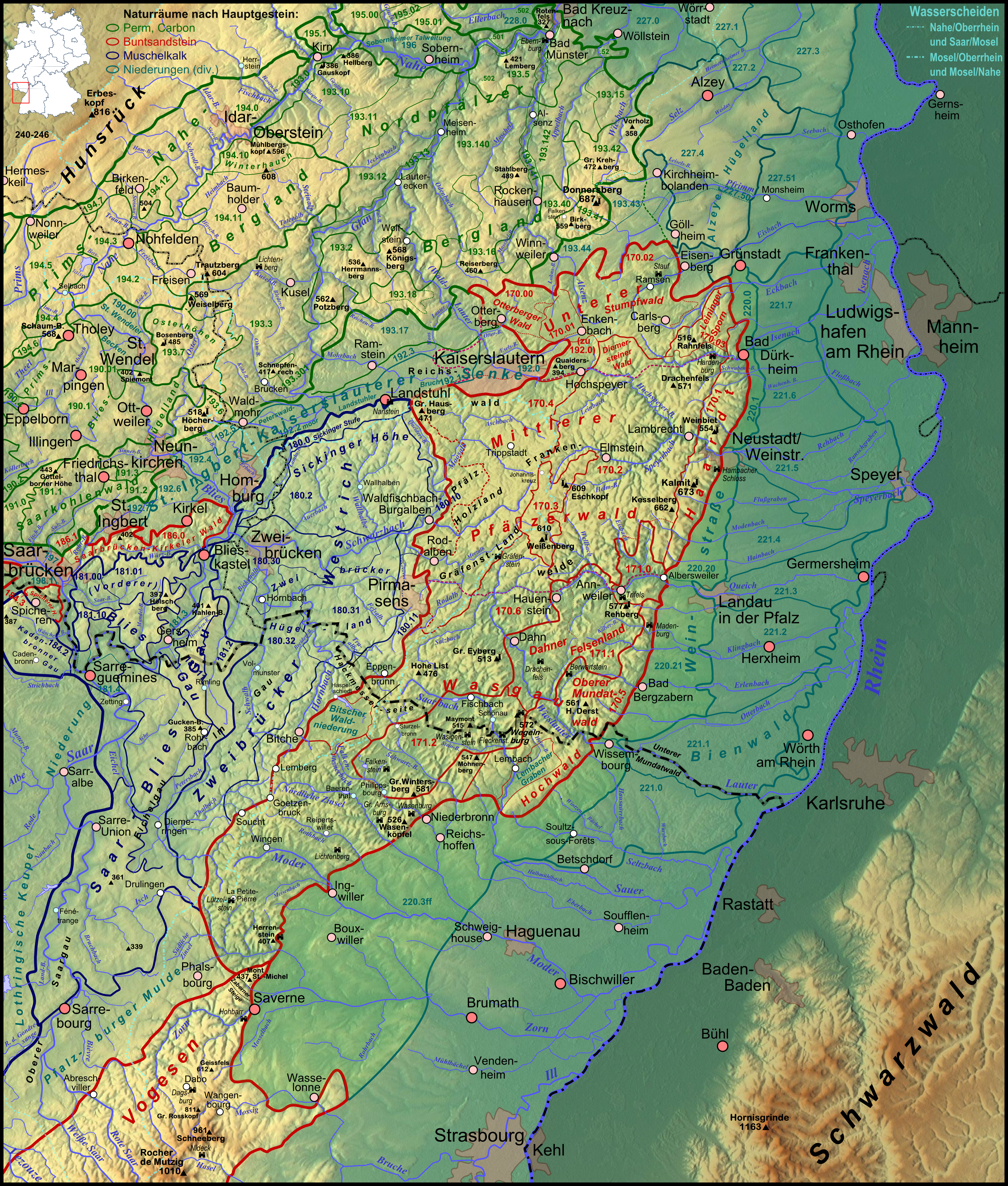
Subdivision of the Palatinate Forest; physical and natural region landscape names and boundaries in red, surrounding major landscapes in other colours

- Palatinate Forest
  - Lower Palatinate Forest (Northern Palatinate Forest)
    - Otterberg Forest (up to around 380 m)
    - (Sembach Plateax)
    - Stumpfwald (only over 400 m near the southern boundary)
    - Queitersberg (Quaidersberg, Quaitersberg; 394 m); eastern outskirts of Kaiserslautern
  - Central Palatinate Forest (only significantly separate landscape subdivisions shown)
    - Diemerstein Forest (up to around 450 m)
    - Leininger Sporn (up to 516 m)
    - High Palatinate Forest (main plateau of the Frankenweide; up to 610 m)
    - Haardt (up to 673 m)
  - Wasgau
    - Western Wasgau (up to 513 m)
      - Bitche Forest Lowland
    - Dahn-Annweiler Felsenland
      - Stürzelbronn-Schönau Felsenland (up to 581 m)
      - Dahner Felsenland (up to 577 m)
        - Dahner Felsenland in the narrower sense
        - Annweiler Felsenland
      - Annweiler-Albersweiler Outskirts ("Trifelsland")
    - Eastern Wasgau
      - Upper Mundat Forest (up to 562 m)
      - Hochwald (up to 529 m)
      - Lembach Graben
    - Southern Wasgau (up to 526 m; drains into the Moder)

== History ==
=== Name ===
The name Pfälzerwald was first used in 1843 – when the Palatinate was part of the Kingdom of Bavaria – by foresters in the centrally located municipality of Johanniskreuz, who used it to refer to the woods of the bunter sandstone region of the Palatinate. Its use was extended when, in 1902, the Palatinate Forest Club (Pfälzerwald-Verein or PWV) was founded, Fritz Claus, one of the pioneers of the PWV, in particular, strove to promote the name. A more precise, scientifically based definition of the Palatinate Forest as an independent natural region was introduced in 1911 by Daniel Häberle, a Palatine geographer and local historian.

Prior to 1850, there was no overall name for the Palatine's bunter sandstone mountains. Historical territorial factors, rather than geographical ones, governed perceptions at the time. By contrast, the Celts and Romans viewed the entire mountain range west of the Rhine as a single unit, making no distinction between different parts of the region that, today, is the Palatinate Forest and the Vosges. The range was named after the Celtic forest god Vosegus and is recorded in many Roman manuscripts as "silva vosegus" or "mons vosegus". It was from this linguistic root that, during the Middle Ages, the name Vosges emerged in the French-speaking area and Wasgen or Wasigenwald, later also Wasgau, in the German-speaking region.

So while the term Wasgen continued, for a long time, to refer to the entire range on the west bank of the Rhine, at the beginning of the 20th century, it gradually became restricted to the Alsatian part of the sandstone mountains, whilst the term Pfälzerwald ("Palatinate Forest") became increasingly used to refer to the Palatine part. This led to the Palatinate Forest and Vosges being defined as separate and distinct landscapes. However, in recent decades, in the context of European integration (the Schengen Agreement), there has been an increasing trend to regard the entire mountain complex as a single geographical entity again. Evidence of this changed attitude can be seen, for example, in the establishment in 1998 of the first cross-border biosphere reserve, the Palatinate Forest-North Vosges Biosphere Reserve by UNESCO.

=== History of settlement ===
==== Traces of activity (to the 10th century) ====
Whilst there are traces of human activities in the more habitable regions of what is now the Palatinate, taking place since the Neolithic period (5,500-4,500 BC), and especially in Celtic (800 to 10 BC) and Roman (10 BC to 450 AD) times, the mountains on the west bank of the Rhine were practically uninhabited and covered by dense, ancient forest until the end of the Migration Period (about 600 AD).

==== Abbeys, colonisation and development (7th to 13th centuries) ====
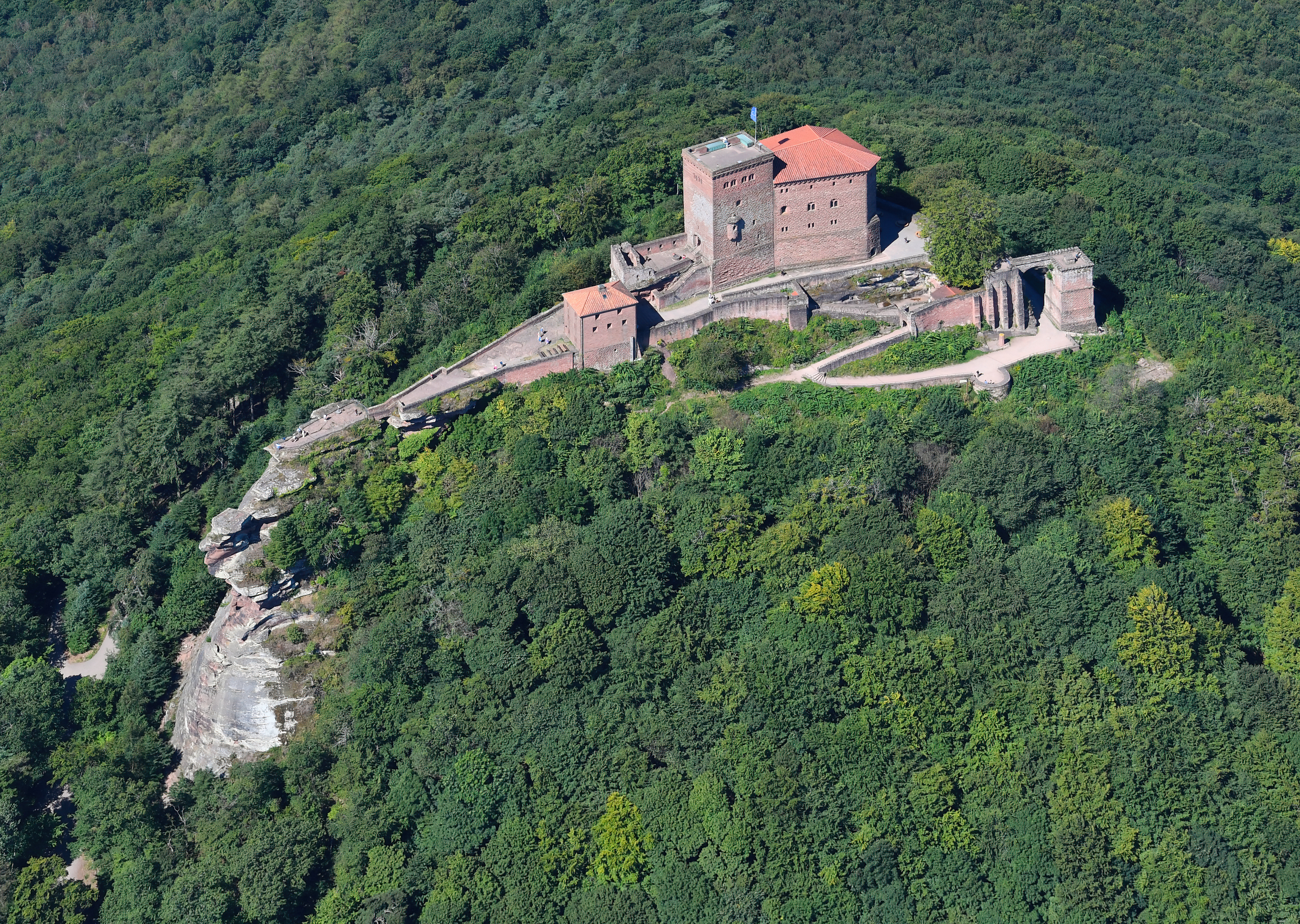
Trifels Castle, the centre of power of the Salian empire

After the Frankish conquests in the Early Middle Ages (7th to 10th century) took them to the edges of today's Palatinate Forest, there was increasing population pressure in the Middle Ages (10th to 13th century), especially through the initiatives of the nobility and the church, e.g. through the establishment of monasteries such as the Cistercian abbeys of Otterberg (1144) and Eußerthal (1148), the colonization and development of the mountains. Areas that could be used for agriculture were cleared and settled permanently. This development reached its peak in the region during the era of the Salian (10th-12th centuries) and Hohenstaufen (12th and 13th century) emperors, with the construction of Trifels Castle and other castles in the surrounding area that, for a time, made it the centre of power of the empire.

==== Abandoned villages, over-exploitation and depletion (14th-18th centuries) ====
This development took place in the Late Middle Ages (13th to 15th centuries) and Early Modern Period (16th to 18th century), because disease (e.g. The Plague) and famine led to a significant decline in population and the total number of settlements fell sharply (leaving abandoned villages), as a result of wars and economic circumstances. Thus, during the colonization of the mountains, areas were often cleared that, because of the nutrient-poor sandy soils, were unsuitable for farming and had to be abandoned after a short period because of overuse and overexploitation. Also, the use of the forest to obtain firewood and timber did not follow the principles of sustainability. On the one hand, the production of straw (foliage as bedding for cattle) and wood pasture damaged the soils and forests; on the other hand the manufacture of iron, glass and potash, which needed a lot of wood, led for centuries to the overuse and destruction of the forest and thus to the further impoverishment of the population. Occupations that the forest itself supported, such as lumberjacks, charcoal burners, rafters, resin burners (pitch boilers) and ash burners, supported only a meagre existence.

==== Immigration, re-impoverishment, first commuters (late 18th to early 20th century) ====
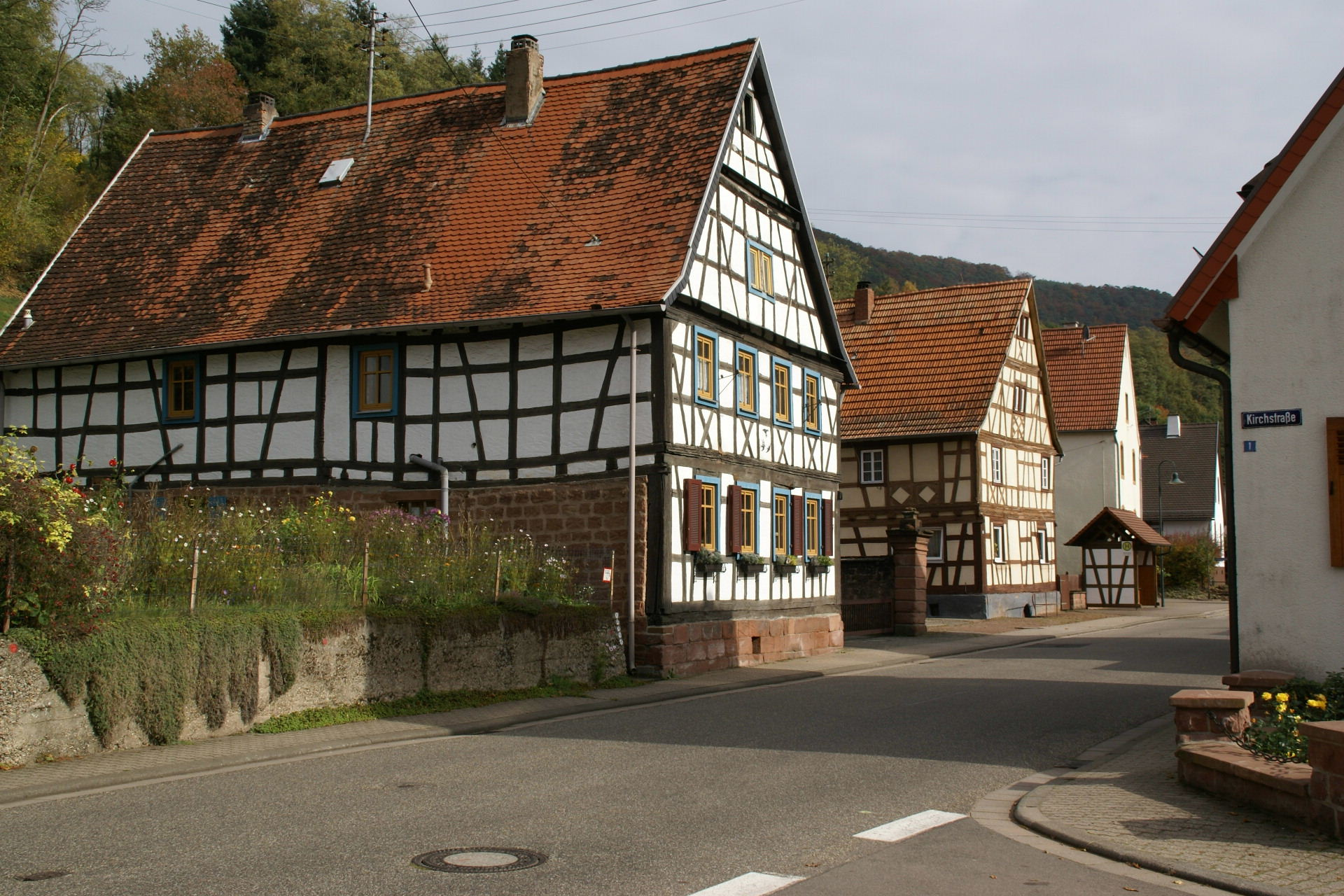
The Wasgau village of Bobenthal: farmhouses in the Rhine-Frankish style

After large population losses during the Thirty Years' War, the population was initially restored and stabilized in the late 17th century, initially as a result of settler migration from the Tyrol and Swabia and the settlement of Huguenot and Mennonite religious refugees from Switzerland, France and the Netherlands. From then to the end of the 18th century, the population expanded as a result of the better design of farms (such as the Frankish house) and the expansion of villages (clustered village or Haufendörfer). This development, however, meant that the resources of the mountains were rapidly exhausted and over-population and poverty, in particular in the 19th century, led to increased emigration to the New World. Apart from the modest level of iron extraction and processing, work in the forests and the operation of paper mills, the shoemaking industry in the region Pirmasens was the only real source of income. This meant that the railway in the second half of the 19th century (the Ludwig Railway and Landau–Zweibrücken line) brought some improvement in the situation, because it became possible to commute to towns outside the Palatinate Forest and seek employment in one of the emerging industries (e.g. BASF at Ludwigshafen) outside the region.

==== Deindustrialisation and tourism (20th and 21st centuries) ====
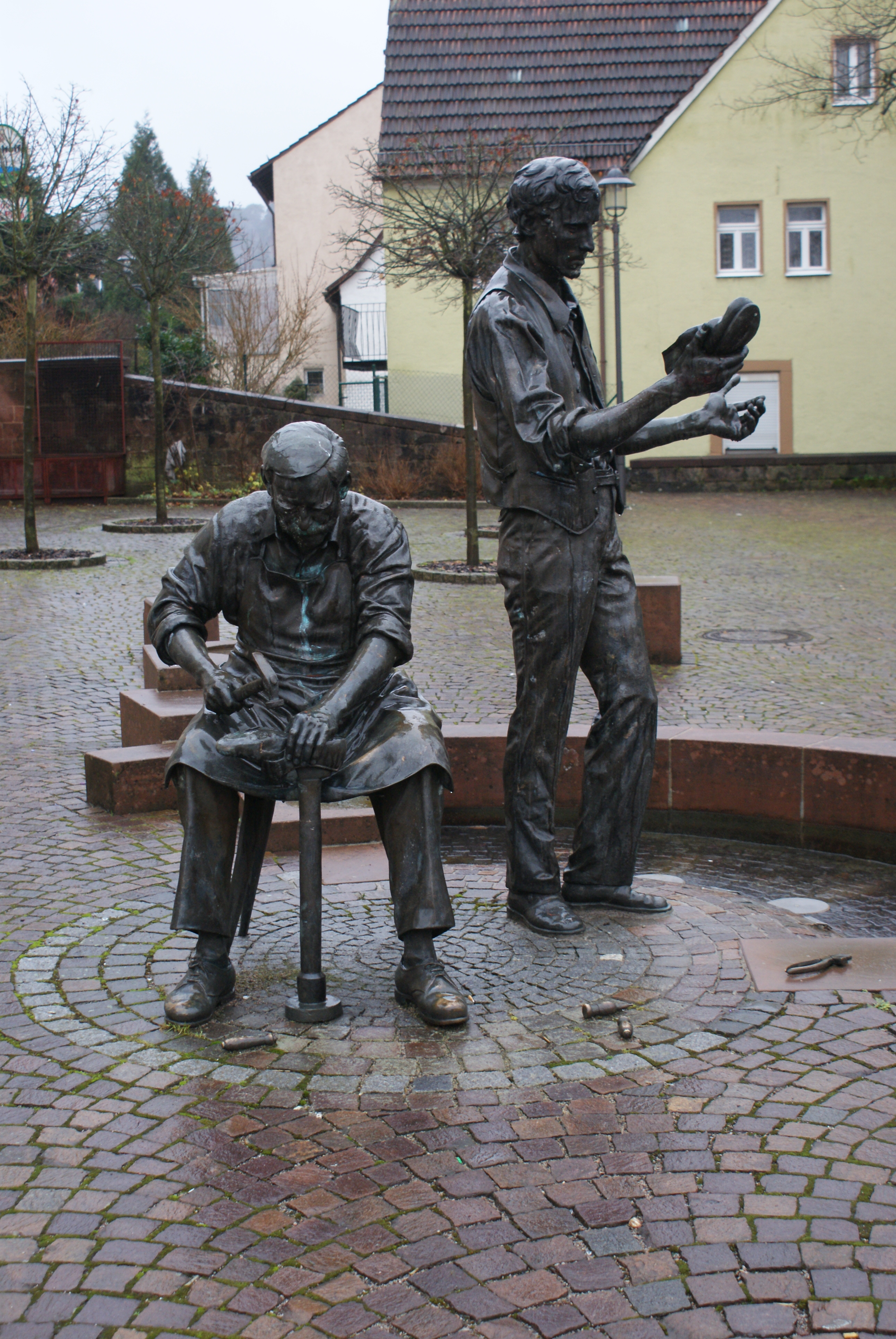
The Schuster Monument in Hauenstein

In the 20th century, the general economic structural changes in Germany also affected the region of the Palatinate Forest, which was increasingly integrated into the overall economic and transport systems. Secluded forest farming villages became municipalities with a service character through the building of infrastructure (e.g. public transport), and, in many cases, the villagers now no longer worked locally, but in more distant regional centres, such as Ludwigshafen and Kaiserslautern.

By contrast local industries in the mountains became rarer or were closed, as can be seen in the example of the footwear industry. Since its heyday in the 1950s and 1960s, globalization has seen the relocation of shoe production abroad, resulting in the almost total collapse of the industry, reinforced especially in the 1980s and 1990s by increasing unemployment and induced migration trends. In addition, the far-reaching demographic changes of the last few decades have caused further structural problems, especially affecting remote communities in sparsely populated areas through population decline, aging and migration.

At the same time, the forested highlands has gained increasing importance in the second half of the twentieth century as a place for recreation and leisure activities of special ecological status. This is reflected in various touristic concepts and activities to offer the native population additional work and income opportunities and to assist in counteracting the structural changes described above.

=== Nature Park and Biosphere Reserve ===
Whereas the Palatinate Forest was earlier seen mainly as a source of raw materials and energy supply, today, in addition to its recreation and leisure function, its ecological importance as a "special protected landscape" has come to the forefront. This change in attitude found visible expression, inter alia, through the establishment of the Palatinate Forest Nature Park and, later the Palatinate Forest-North Vosges Biosphere Reserve.

==== Nature park ====
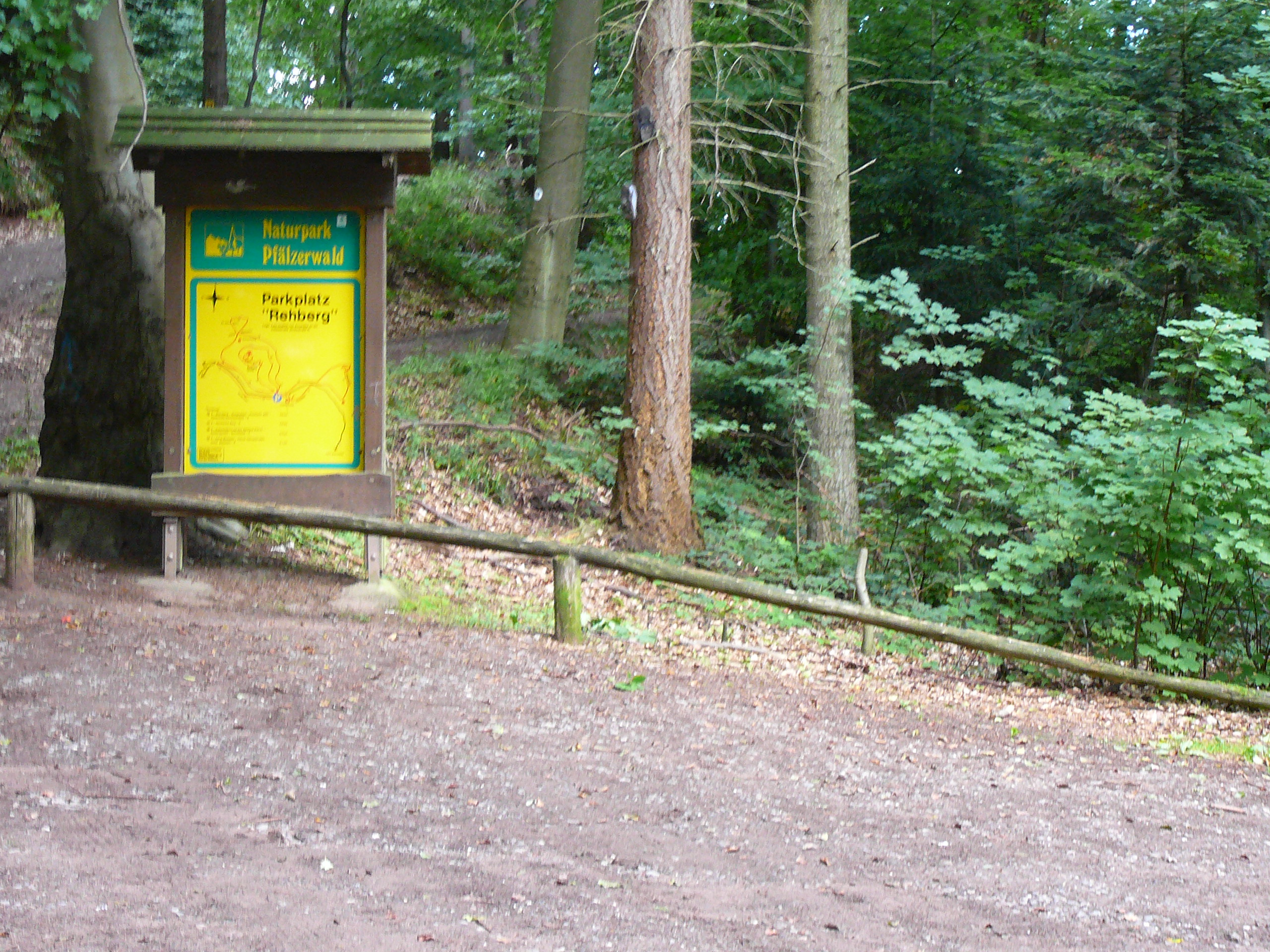
The Rehberg woodland car park from where there are several circular walks

The Palatinate Forest Nature Park was created in 1958 as the third nature park in Germany. In accordance with the requirements of the originator of the nature park concept, Alfred Toepfer, the Palatinate Forest was to be a place of recreation and exercise for the stressed office workers of the cities in the Rhine valley which were then suffering badly from air pollution. The nature park expansion programme envisaged 95 car parks, 13 camp sites, seven observation towers and five open-air pools.

In fact, 62 woodland car parks were created in the first seven years as well as 530 benches and as many waste bins. A total of 370 km of walking routes were added or created and 45 signed circular walks laid out. The management of the nature park took over the Palatinate Forest Club (PWV). The 20 open shelters, built for walkers in log house style, were named "Fischer Huts" after the managing director of the Palatinate Forest Club, Ludwig Fischer.

In the mid-1960s, the PWV came to the conclusion that the work required could not be done by volunteers and handed the management of the nature park to the Palatinate provincial government. By 1974, 3.7 million euros had been spent on improving recreational opportunities.

Around 1975 the expansion of recreational facilities was viewed as complete and attention switched to the care of biotopes and the landscape in the centre. Increasingly there was also a desire to replace the many coniferous monocultures, planted as a result of war, wartime reparations and times of crisis, with species rich site-specific mixed forests.

On 20 July 1982 the Palatinate Forest Nature Park Association (Verein Naturpark Pfälzerwald) was founded as a support organization. The members of the association are those counties and independent towns whose territories are covered by the nature park as well as the Palatinate regional association, various rambling and sports clubs and environmental organizations. Many social organisations are involved in the work of the nature park, ensuring the independence of academic and regional individual interests. The association's goal is to develop the nature park and its eponymous biosphere reserve equally and to maintain its uniqueness and beauty as well as its national recreational value. Since 1997, the head office of the association has been in Lambrecht.

==== Biosphere reserve ====
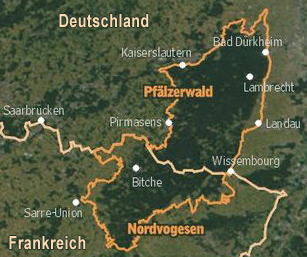
Boundaries of the Palatinate Forest-North Vosges Biosphere Reserve

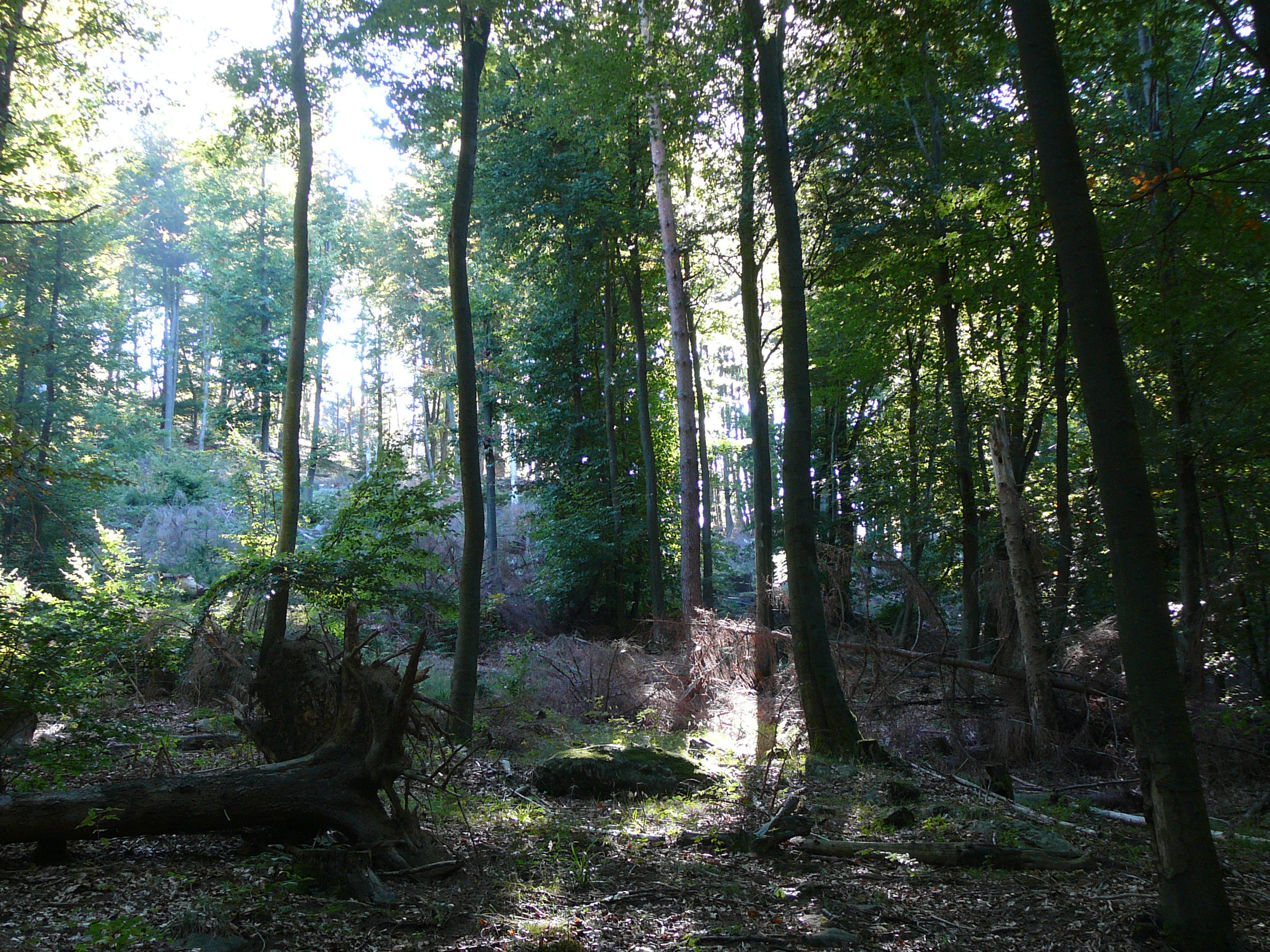
The core zone: Source Region of the Wieslauter (Quellgebiet der Wieslauter)

The Palatinate Forest Nature Park was recognized in 1992 by UNESCO as a biosphere reserve. In 1998 it became the German part of the first cross-border UNESCO biosphere reserve, namely the Palatinate Forest-North Vosges Biosphere Reserve. It thus became the 12th of (as at 2009) 15 German biosphere reserves. These are areas that have a special significance for the global conservation of biological diversity and in which the ecological aspects, sustainable economic management, environmental education and environmental research are best linked together.

In 2007, the state of Rhineland–Palatinate issued an ordinance by which the UNESCO guidelines for the design of biosphere reserves would be implemented specifically for the Palatinate Forest Nature Park. This laid down a zoning scheme as its main focus, which envisaged three zones with different objectives and protection functions:

- Core areas
  Securely protected sites for conserving biological diversity where there is a "least possible influence on the course of natural processes", i.e. complete protection of typical ecosystems is ensured.
- Buffer zones
  The buffer zones are used for "ecologically sound farming practices" that conserve landscape character. They are intended to complement and link the core areas.
- Transition areas
  The main focus is on the promotion of "model projects for sustainability" that, for example, may include the development of sustainable tourism concepts or the environmentally friendly production of regional products.

The "quiet zones" (Stillezonen) also covered in the law are intended to ensure a "recreation in the stillness", but are not part of the UNESCO guidelines for biosphere reserves. The concept originates rather from the old protected area regulation for the Palatinate Forest Nature Park (1984) and therefore overlaps with the other three zones.

Core, buffer and transition zones are representatively distributed over the area of the biosphere reserve. As part of this, some 16 core zones were defined, together covering about 2.3 percent of the area. The source region of the Wieslauter (2,296 ha) being the largest of the core area in the biosphere reserve, with its mixed stands of primeval beech, oak and pine.

== Geology ==
The Palatinate Forest is primarily characterised by a block of Bunter sandstone and its underlying formations of Zechstein. The tectonically formed bedding of these rock types and their subsequent erosion led to the topography of this low mountain range that we see today.

=== Development history ===
==== Formation of the bunter sandstone ====
In the Permian geological period (about 296–251 million years ago) the first sandstone formations, some 100 metres thick, were deposited in the area of today's Palatinate Forest; in particular, the rock units of the Rotliegendes and the Zechstein (about 256–251 million years ago) are important. At the beginning of the Germanic Triassic, i.e. from the Lower to the beginning of the Middle Triassic, there was (about 251–243 million years ago) a desert-like climate, so that as a result of further depositions of sand, rock layers of up to 500 metres thickness were formed. This led inter alia, through the addition of iron oxide, to a variable colouration of the rock strata – hence the name "bunter" sandstone (bunter being German for "coloured") – and, depending on the type and binding of the material, (clay-bound sandstone as opposed to silicified quartz sandstone) to the formation of rock layers of different hardness. This resulted in the subgroups of lower, middle and upper bunter sandstone. These bunter sandstone formations were buried by various types of sediments in the adjacent sections of muschelkalk (243–235 million years ago) and keuper (234–200 million years ago), and also during the Jurassic (200–142 million years ago) and Cretaceous (142–66 million years ago).

==== Laying down of the bunter sandstone ====
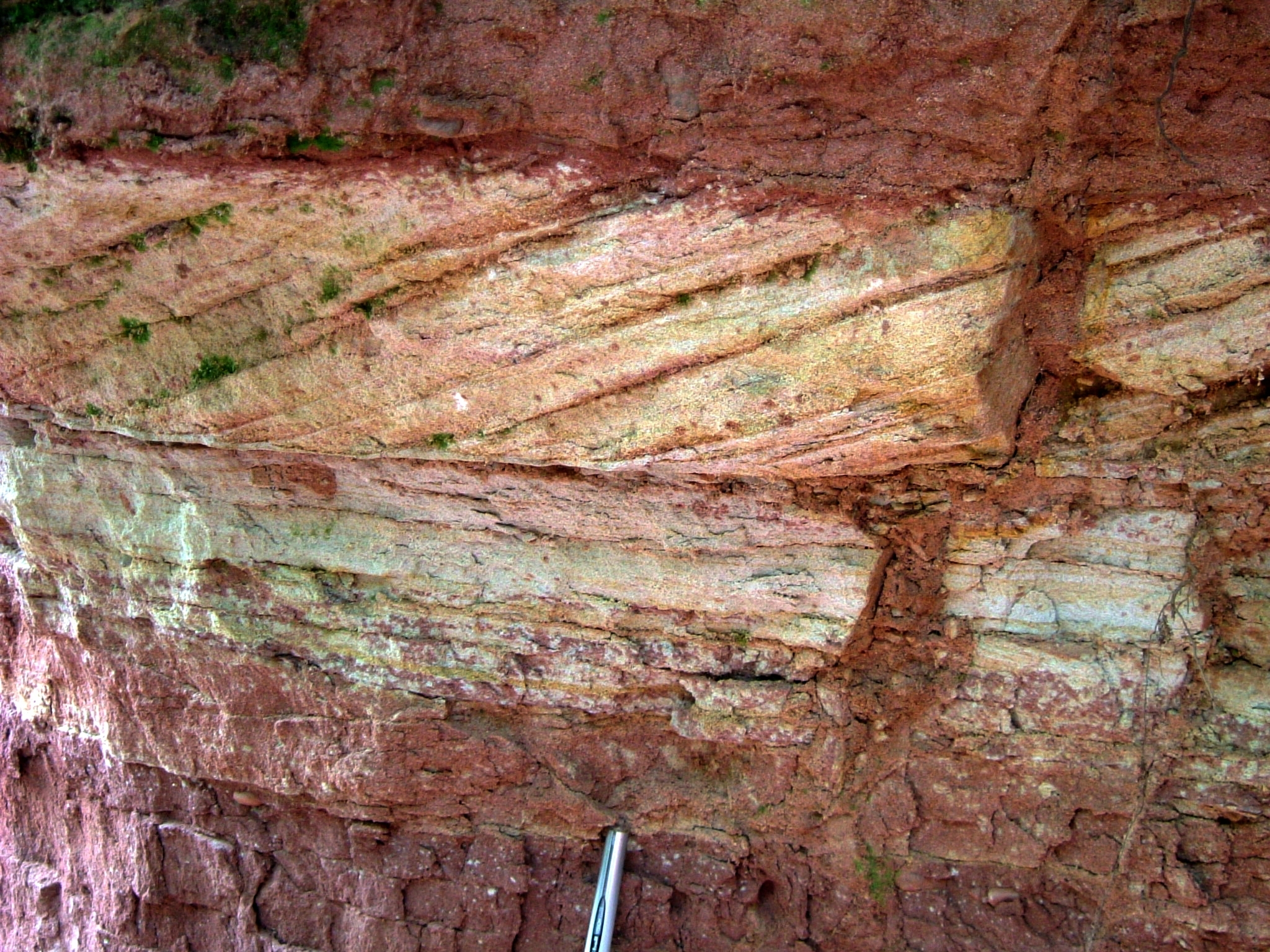
Cross-bedding of the bunter sandstone at the foot of the Devil's Table near Hinterweidenthal

At the beginning of the Palaeogene period of the Cenozoic era (66 to 23.8 million years ago) the formation of the Alps led to considerable tensions in the Earth's crust, which, in their forelands to the north of the Alps, caused a bulge in the mantle and crust. At the apex of the arch so formed, there were considerable tensile stresses, so that the rock layers were stretched and about 35 million years ago, deep cracks and depressions in the Earth's crust occurred (passive rifting). At the same time the sides of the newly created lowlands were uplifted, in the case of the Palatinate Forest, to a height of about 1000 metres.

These processes, which continue today, have had four important implications for the present landscape of the low mountain region:

- The removal of approximately 800 metres of surface rock (dogger, lias, keuper and muschelkalk), thus exposing the bunter sandstone
- The tilting of the sandstone layers
- the formation of swells and troughs
- The breaking the bunter sandstone into individual fault blocks and the formation of faults

==== Shaping of today's landscape ====
In the later Paleogene (34 to 23.8 million years ago) and Neogene (23.8 to 2.8 million years ago) and also in the Quaternary period (2.8 to 0.01 million years ago) erosion processes once more dominated. In particular, it was the weathering and removal processes that occurred during the various cold and warm periods that determined the final topographical shape of the Palatinate Forest. Characteristic of this is a system of deeply incised valleys, especially in the north and centre, diverse mountain shapes and bizarre rock formations.

=== Structure ===
==== Bedrock ====
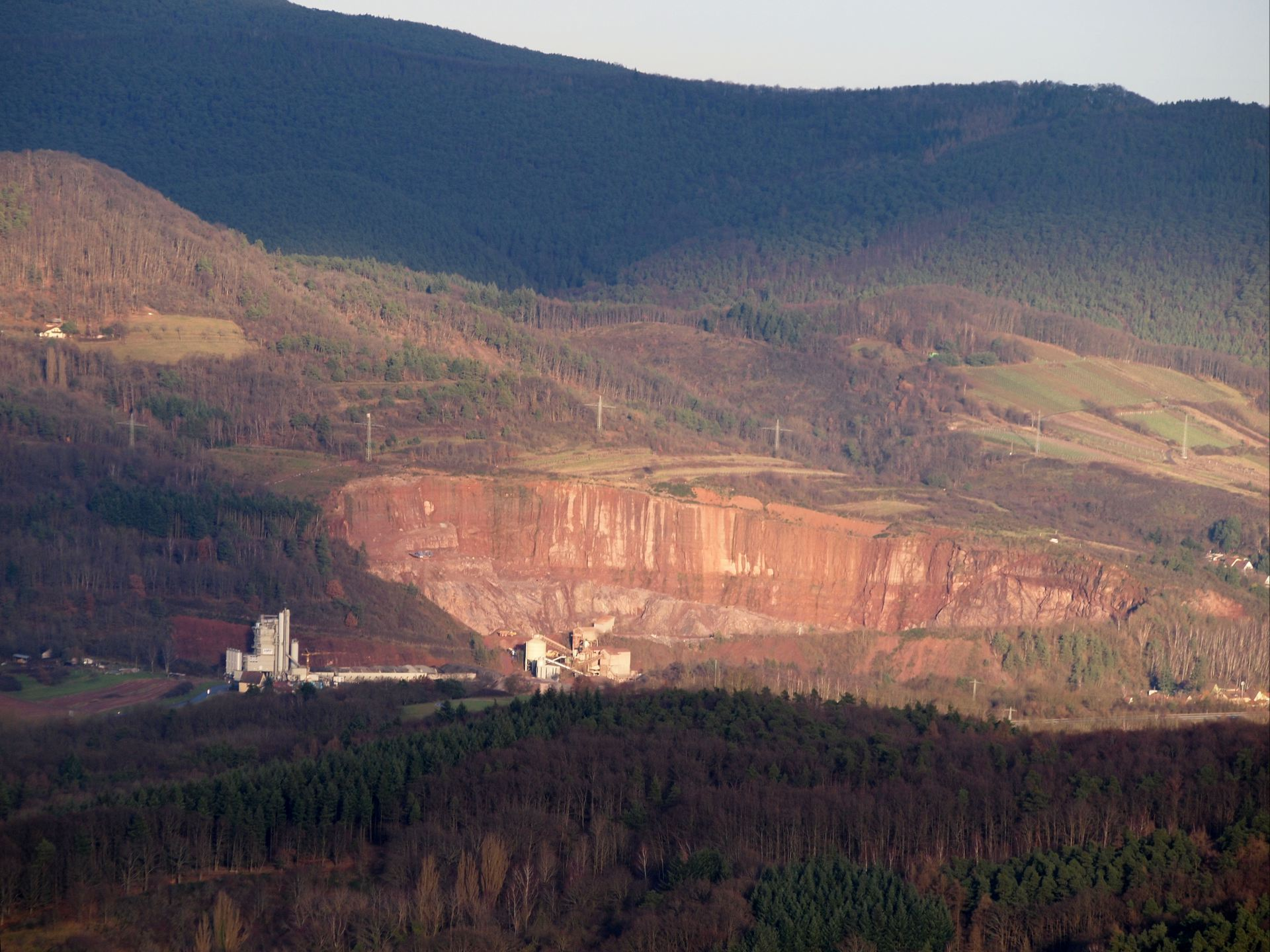
Gneiss quarry in the Queich valley

Gneisses and slates form the bedrock of the Palatinate Forest today, but they are generally covered by younger rock formations, cropping out only in a few places on the eastern edge of the mountains.

==== Rotliegendes and Zechstein formations ====
These rock strata cover the bedrock and consist, in addition to sandstone, of shale and marl. They generally have a softer consistency and therefore form broad valleys and erosion surfaces in the northern Palatinate Forest (the Stumpfwald) as well as in the southeast. The southern Palatinate sandstone formations of the Zechstein are divided into four strata having a total thickness of about 80 to 100 metres.

==== Bunter sandstone beds ====
The rock unit of bunter sandstone is divided into three strata:

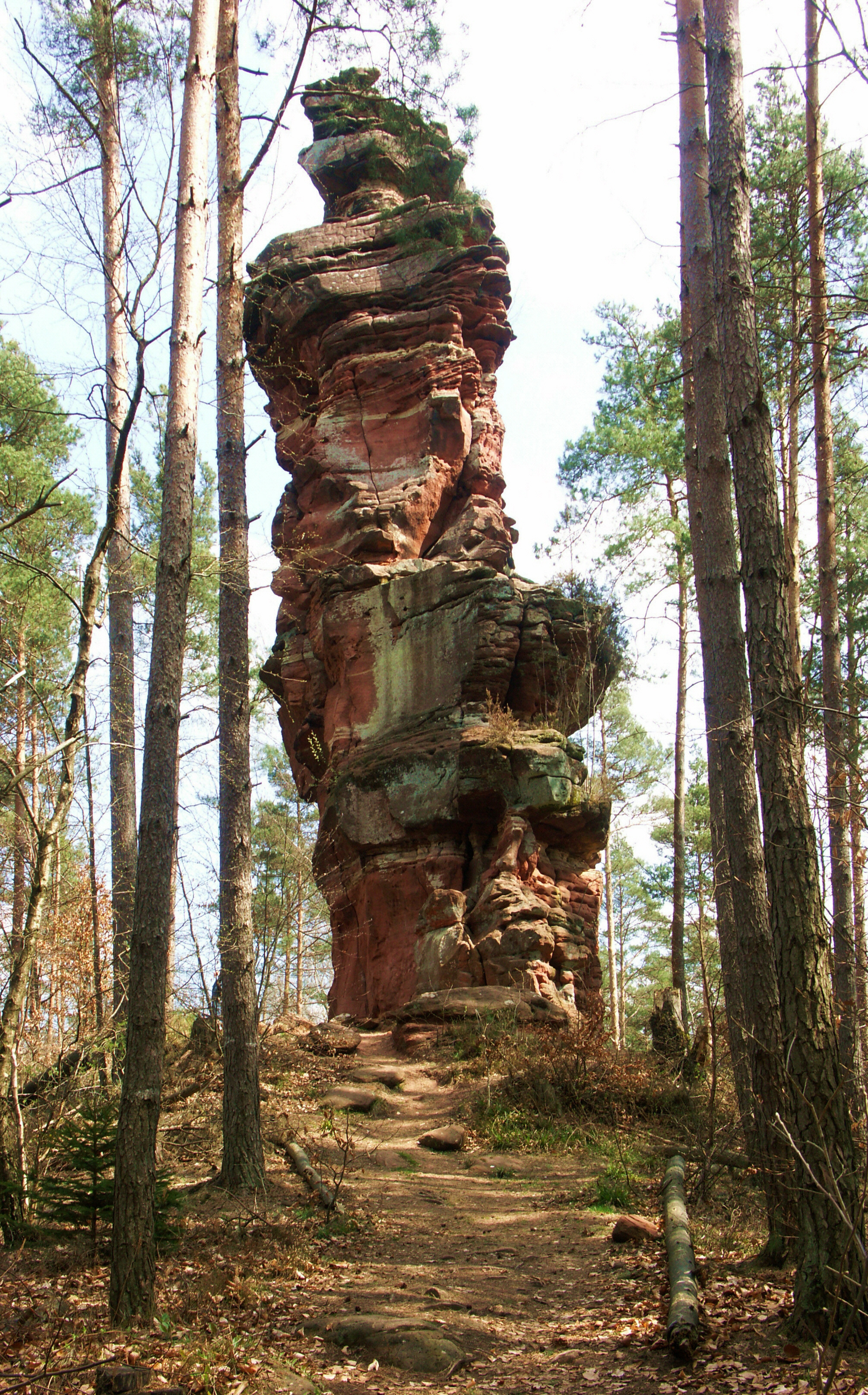
Trifels beds of the Napoleonsfels rocks near Bruchweiler in the Dahner Felsenland

- Lower Bunter
  The Lower Bunter is the typical rock of the Palatine Forest and covers large areas of the low mountain range to a depth of 280 to 380 metres. The sandstones contain much quartz and little feldspar and mica, so that they weather into sandy soils, poor in nutrients that are scarcely used for agricultural purposes. In all there are three subdivisions – the Trifels, Rehberg and Schlossberg beds – in which several rock zones of differing thickness are combined.
- Middle Bunter
  In the Middle Bunter, too, various rock zones with thicknesses of about 80 to 100 metres may be identified. The most striking are the Karlstal beds, which mainly occur at the surface as silicified blocks of rock, and the upper rock zone and the primary conglomerate, which also consist of silicified coarse sandstones and scree. At the top of this formation is the "violet boundary layer" (violette Grenzschicht), which mainly consists of fine, mica-rich sediments.
- Upper Bunter
  Intermediate beds and Voltzien sandstone together form the Upper Bunter with a thickness of about a hundred metres. Unlike the Lower and Middle Bunter beds, these strata contain more mica, carbonates and clay minerals and thus weather down to soils rich in nutrients, that are used for agriculture in island clearings in the western Palatine Forest (the Holzland).

== Geomorphology ==
=== Landscape character ===
Weathering and erosion of the different rock strata of the Palatine Forest with their variable hardness have resulted in a low mountain landscape with a dense, deeply incised system of valleys and wide variety of hill shapes. The hard and resistant rocks of the Lower and Middle Bunter have produced a scarpland relief, whose cuestas characterize the landscape, especially in the north and east, whilst the southeastern part of the Palatinate Forest is dominated by rather isolated types of hill separated by erosion surfaces.

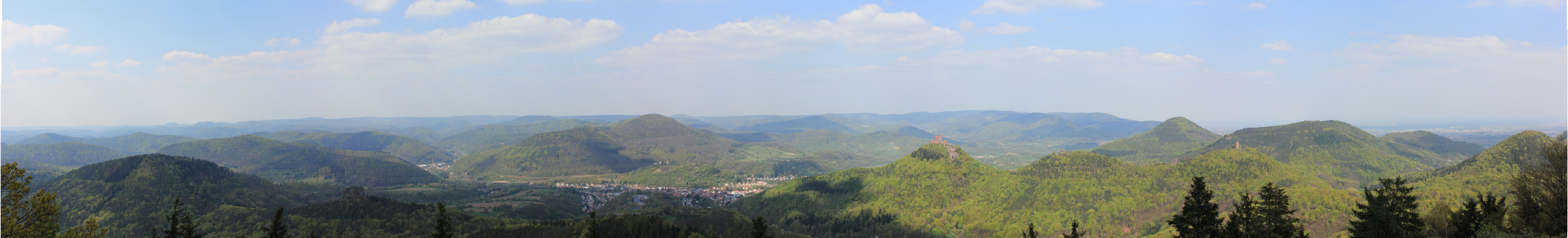
The Palatinate Forest is a heavily incised, low mountain range with many hillforms and dense afforestation: panoramic view from the Rehberg (tower) on the Trifels looking north.

=== Mountains, hills and rock formations ===
==== General features ====
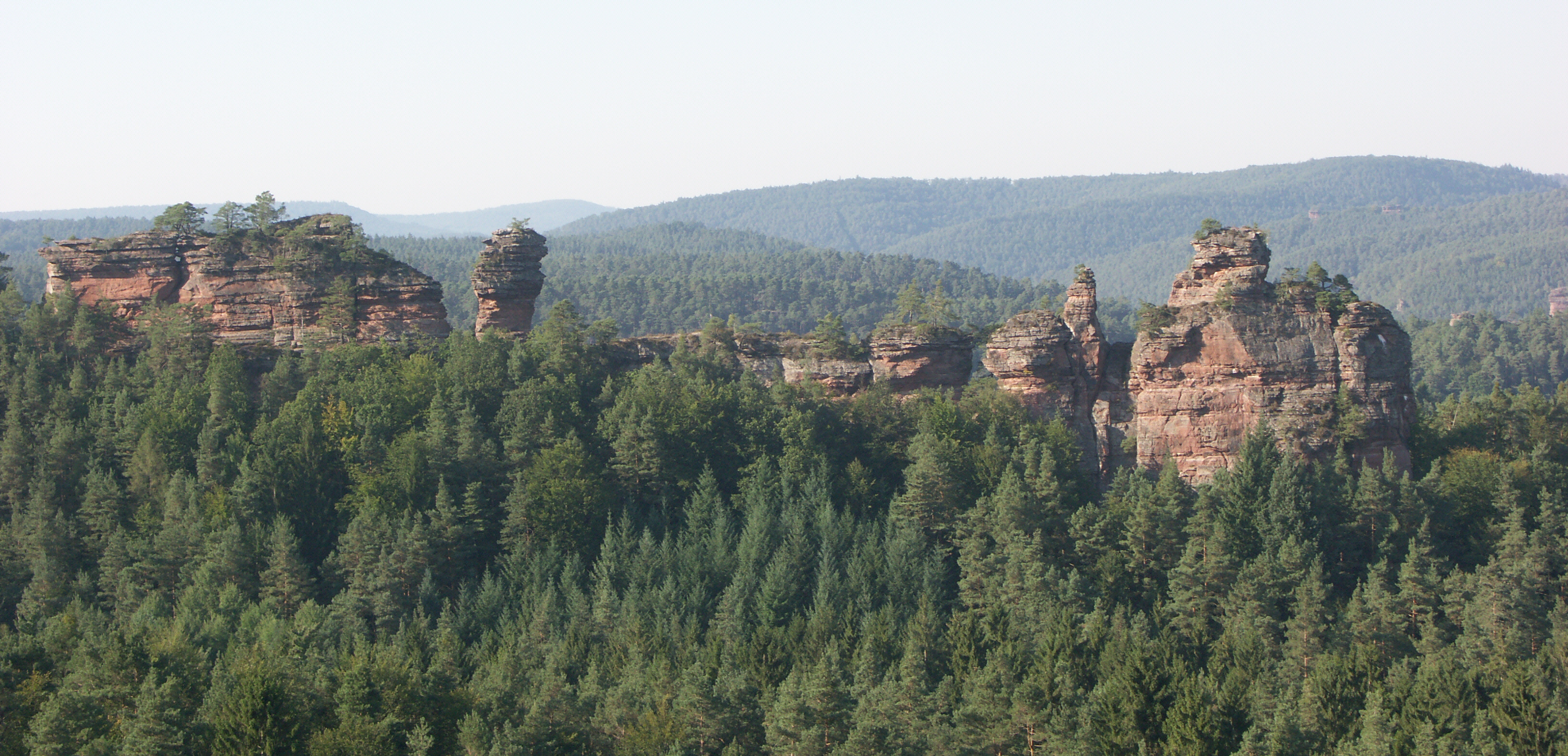
Example of a rock terrace: the Lämmerfelsen near Dahn

In the bunter sandstone mountains a wide variety of hill shapes may be observed, depending on the various rock strata of which they are composed. Typical of the northern and central Palatinate Forest are prominent hill "blocks" (Bergklötze) and elongated trapezium-shaped ridges, frequently with rocky summit areas (e. g. the Kesselberg, 661.8 m) whilst, in the western part of the range, plateau-like hill formations with clearings predominate. In the southeastern Palatinate Forest, by contrast, the sediments of the Rotliegendes and Zechstein (erosion surfaces), and especially resistant Trifels and Rehberg beds (conical hills) influence the appearance of the countryside.

Over the millennia, the weathering and erosion of the sandstone, with its varying degrees of hardness, have produced bizarre rock formations, e. g. rock pinnacles, rock faces, rock walls and rock blocks. In addition, the small-scale weathering of strata of differing hardness has produced caves, natural arches and table rocks (Devil's Table). On the almost two-kilometre-long rock terrace of the Altschlossfelsen, fractures, overhangs and honeycomb weathering can also be observed. By contrast, felsenmeers and blockfields tend to be found more in the central Palatine Forest.

==== Detailed topographic description ====
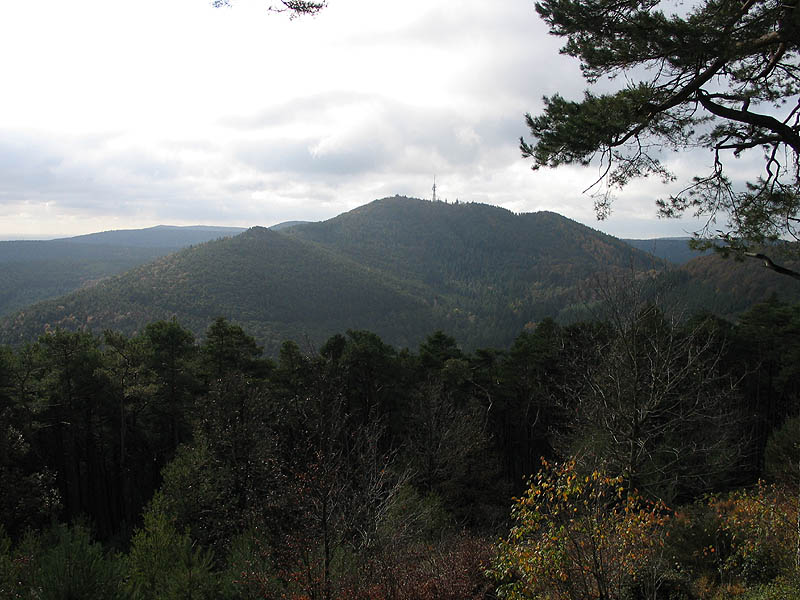
The Kalmit, the highest peak in the Palatine Forest

The highest points in this low mountain range occur in the central Palatinate Forest, and mainly in the east.

Here, in a single, contiguous ridge is a series of peaks exceeding the 600 metre mark, of which the Great Kalmit, at 672.6 m, is also the highest point of the entire Palatinate Forest. The ridge begins at the Steigerkopf (also called the Schänzel) (about 500 m) and heads westwards to the Frankenweide region around the Eschkopf (609.9 m) and Weißenberg (609.9 m). This massif extends from the town of Hochspeyer via Johanniskreuz to Hauenstein. Its central area between Johanniskreuz and Hermersbergerhof rather resembles a plateau bounded by deeply incised valleys. This plateau also runs towards the west at a height of about 500 m before descending gradually to 400 m. It is bisected by the Schwarzbach and Moosalb rivers. To the southwest other ridges separate the valleys of the Merzalbe and the headstreams of the Wieslauter. It is therefore possible to walk from Neustadt an der Weinstraße to Leimen or Kaiserslautern-Mölschbach without dropping below the 450 metre contour line.

North of the line from Hochspeyerbach to Speyerbach the highest points are the 570.8 m high Drachenfels and the Hoher Stoppelkopf (Stoppelkopf; 566.2 m). In the triangle formed by the Isenach to the north and German Wine Route to the east are other hills over 500 metres in height. The most prominent are Neustadt's northern local hill (Hausberg), the Weinbiet (554.0 m), and the Eckkopf (516.0 m) near Deidesheim. North of the Isenach only the Rahnfels (516.5 m) breaks through the 500 metre contour. In its continuation to the north its descends from 400 to 300 metres above sea level.

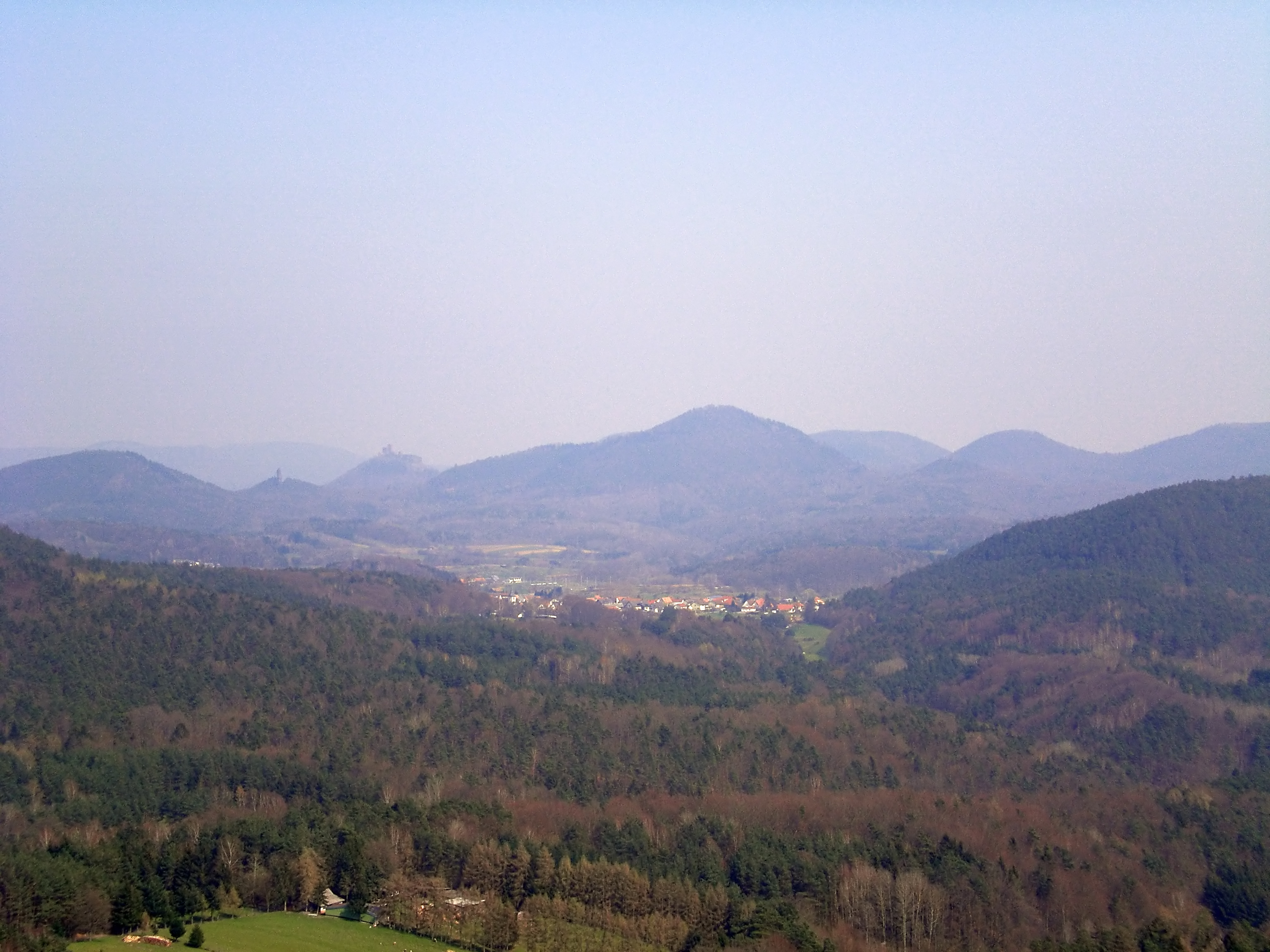
Typical Wasgau countryside with erosion surfaces and conical hills: view from the Lindelbrunn to the Rehberg (centre)

South of the Queich the countryside changes due to the somewhat different geological situation (see Landscape character). Here larger erosion surfaces and rather isolated hillforms (conical hills), which on average reach heights of 450 metres, characterize the landscape. The highest points on the German side of the Wasgau are the Rehberg (576.8 m) near Annweiler, the castle hill of the ruins of Wegelnburg (570.9 m) near Nothweiler, followed by the Hohe Derst (560.5 m) west of Bad Bergzabern and the Großer Eyberg (513.0 m) southwest of Dahn. The Hohe List (475.8 m) and Erlenkopf (472.1 m) near Eppenbrunn are the highest points in the southwest.

==== Tabular overview ====
The category structure of the list is based on the concept for the natural region division of the Palatine Forest. The important summits of the range are annotated with their corresponding landscape subdivision and arranged according to their height in metres (m) above sea level (NHN). The nearest settlement is given for lesser known hills or those for which there is no Wikipedia article.

Lower, or Northern, Palatine Forest		Central Palatine Forest			Southern Palatine Forest or German Wasgau	
Stumpfwald	Otterberg Forest	Haardt	Frankenweide	other regions	Wasgau Felsenland	other regions
Leuchtenberg (491.5 m) (south of Carlsberg)	Heidenkopf (419.6 m) (east of Schneckenhausen)	Kalmit (672.6 m)	Mosisberg (ca. 610 m)	Schafkopf (617.8 m)	Rehberg (576.8 m)	Hohe Derst (560.5 m) (west of Dörrenbach)
Steinkopf (484.0 m) (south of Carlsberg)	Andreasberg (401.0 m) (südeast of Schneckenhausen)	Kesselberg (661.8 m)	Weißenberg (609.9 m)	Steigerkopf (Schänzel) (613.6 m)	Wegelnburg (570.9 m)	Bobenthaler Knopf (53.9 m)
Kieskautberg (460.6 m) (south of Carlsberg)	Eulenkopf (399.6 m) (südwest of Potzbach)	Roßberg (637.0 m)	Eschkopf (608.3 m)	Morschenberg (608.3 m) (west of Sankt Martin)	Hohenberg (551.9 m)	Schletterberg (ca. 523 m) (north of Waldhambach)
Heidenberg (446.2 m) (südeast of Alsenborn)	Queitersberg (394.0 m)	Hochberg (635.3 m)	Hortenkopf (606.2 m)	Rotsohlberg (607.1 m) (west of Sankt Martin)	Förlenberg (533.1 m) (west of Leinsweiler)	Krummer Ellenbogen (514.7 m) (east of Niederschlettenbach)
Hohe Bühl (443.6 m) (west of Carlsberg)	Backofen (389.2 m) (northwest of Drehentalerhof)	Hohe Loog (618.7 m)	Schindhübel (ca. 571 m)	Hermeskopf (581.3 m) (north of Ramberg)	Schlüsselfelsen (524.0 m) (east of Schönau)	Großer Eyberg (513.0 m)
Schorlenberg (402.0 m) (east of Alsenborn)	Bruchberg (388.6 m) (north of Otterberg)	Blättersberg (613.2 m)	Bloskülb (570.2 m)	Drachenfels (571 m)	Maimont (515.0 m) (south of Fischbach)	Treutelsberg (503.7 m) (west of Klingenmünster)
Bocksrück (400.6 m) (west of Sippersfeld)	Gersweilerkopf (378.9 m) (east of Erlenbach)	Teufelsberg (597.6 m)	Blosenberg (558.9 m) (west of Hofstätten)	Großer Adelberg (567.4 m) (north of Annweiler)	Wetterberg (512.7 m) (west of Leinsweiler)	Großer Mückenkopf (484.9 m) (north of Fischbach)
Eiskopf (397.0 m) (east of Alsenborn)	Großer Ohligkopf (377.6 m) (east of Otterberg)	Orensberg (581.2 m)	Katzenkopf (553.3 m) (north of Wilgartswiesen)	Hoher Stoppelkopf (566.2 m)	Kappelstein (498.0 m) (south of Nothweiler)	Stäffelsberg (480.8 m) (west of Dörrenbach)
Klauserkopf (384.0 m) (north of Ramsen)	Einsiedlerberg (370.0 m) (northeast of Drehentalerhof)	Weinbiet (554.0 m)	Staufelkopf (552.0 m) (northwest of Wilgartswiesen)	Almersberg (564.1 m) (north of Rinnthal)	Jüngstberg (491.1 m) (east of Wieslautern)	Hohe List (475.8 m) (east of Eppenbrunn)
Pfrimmerberg (377.1 m) (east of Sippersfeld)	Sulzberg (368.9 m) (east of Erlenbach)	Eckkopf (516.0 m)	Spitze Boll (540.1 m) (südwest of Hermersbergerhof)	Rahnfels (516.5 m)	Wolfshorn (476.7 m) (west of Schwanheim)	Erlenkopf (472.1 m) (south of Eppenbrunn)

=== Valleys and streams ===
==== General features ====
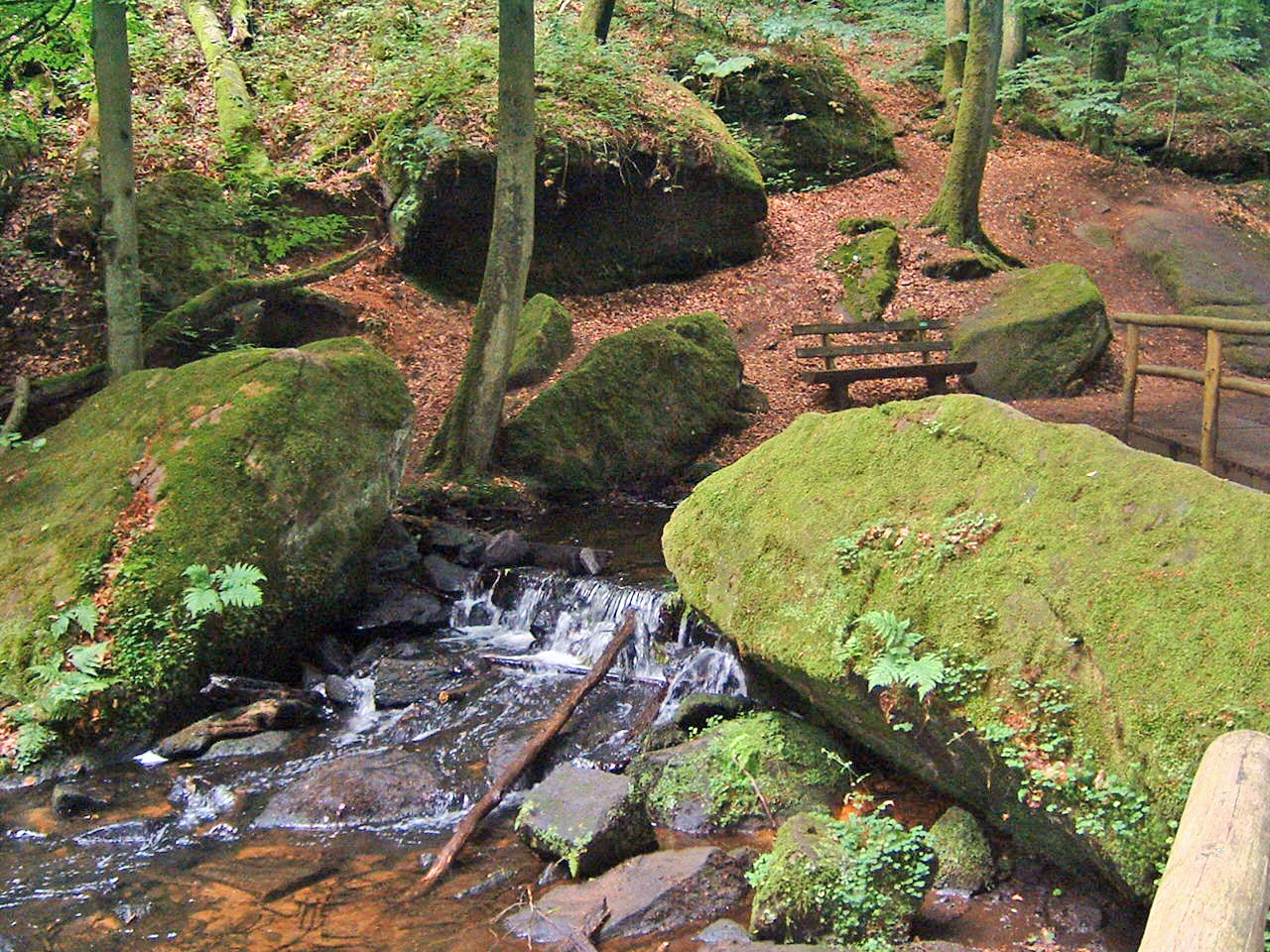
Water conducting and feeding rock zone of the Karlstal beds: Moosalb im Karlstal

Characteristic of the Lower and Middle Bunter are V-shaped valleys, with narrow floors and steep sides, cutting deeply into the bedrock. They are the typical valley forms in the central Palatinate Forest, whilst in the southern and northern parts, U-shaped valleys with wider floors predominate. In the southwestern part of the Forest are the so-called woog valleys, in which the valley floor is wide and they are therefore especially well suited for the construction of ponds, or woogs, reservoirs and small lakes (see below).

==== Hydrological balance ====
A typical feature of the Palatinate Forest is its abundance of water, that has led to a highly developed system of streams, rivers and wetlands (see below). The sandy soils caused by erosion are very very permeable to water, so that rainwater quickly seeps into the ground and is then stored in the different rock zones as groundwater that can be channeled by the joints and fissure ("fissure flow"). This groundwater feeds into various rock zones, especially in the Trifels beds of the Lower Bunter and in a rock zone of the Karlstal beds (Middle Bunter). Beds of clay-bonded sandstone form spring horizons, where it is discharged at the surface again e.g. in contact springs. Since the sandstone is very low in minerals and the groundwater, therefore, only has only low levels of dissolved contents, the water is in the low hardness range ("soft") and is slightly acidic (low pH).

==== Lakes and reservoirs ====
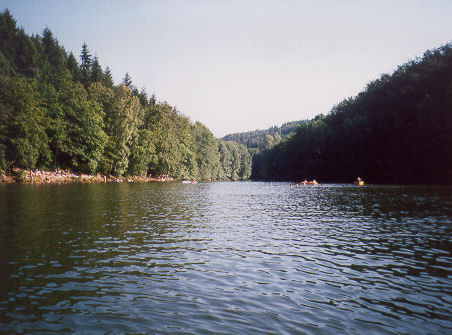
The Eiswoog reservoir in the northern Palatine Forest

The conditions described above have also led to the formation of a great number of wetlands, that are frequently linked to spring horizons and into which groundwater reaches the surface again. As a result, bogs, bog lakes and other small lakes, the so-called woogs are typical of the Palatine Forest, albeit the majority of woogs do not have a natural origin. They were more often artificially laid out by the impoundment of streams and were used as stages and reservoirs for timber rafting. However, the area covered by all the lakes and woogs in the Palatine Forest is not significant. The best known are the Gelterswoog on the northwestern edge, the Clausensee in the southwest and the Eiswoog in the northeast.

==== Rivers ====
The Palatinate Forest is drained by four great catchment systems and also by smaller catchments or individual streams. The four large systems are the Speyerbach, the Queich, the Lauter (or Wieslauter in its upper reaches) and the Schwarzbach. Whilst the first three flow directly into the Rhine, the waters of the Schwarzbach make their way indirectly via the Blies, Saar and Moselle rivers. Smaller drainage systems are, e.g., the Saarbach or the Isenach, which only have tributaries within a small area. The majority of small streams that drain the Forest directly into the Rhine Plain flow over extensive ditch systems to the nearest river to the north. For example, the Speyerbach picks up the waters of the Hainbach, the Modenbach and the Krebsbach.

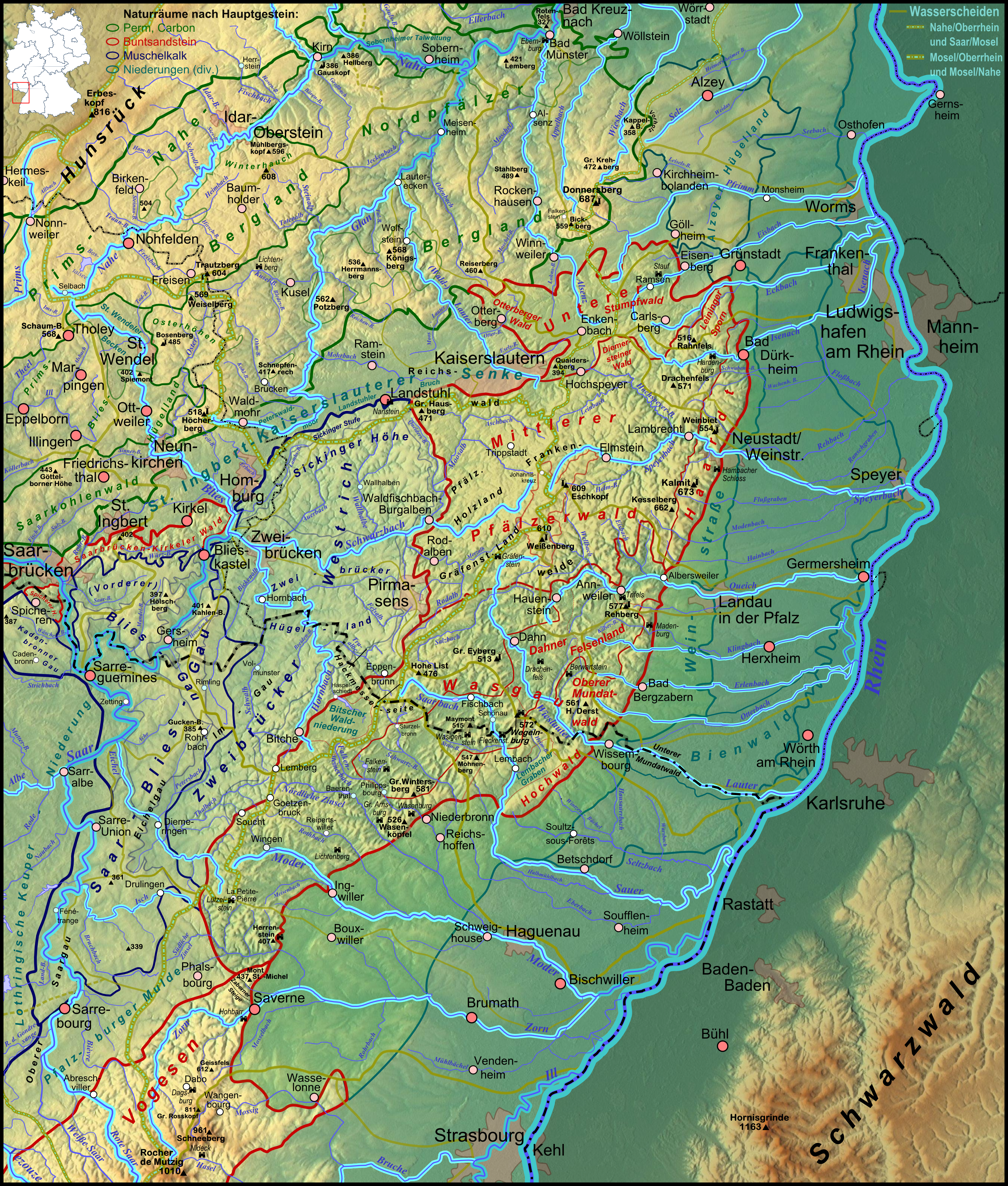
The eleven river basins of the Palatine Forest with the four most important around the central plateau

The following river systems drain the Palatine Forest. They are listed in clockwise direction, beginning in the west (in brackets the overall catchment area):

- Schwarzbach (1151.5 km^{2})
  - Rodalb (116.2 km^{2})
  - Schwarzbach
  - Moosalb (188.2 km^{2})
- (Wald-)Lauter (275.6 km^{2})
- Alsenz (327.7 km^{2})
- Pfrimm (246.4 km^{2})
- Eisbach/Eckbach
  - Eisbach („Altbach“, 130.2 km^{2})
  - Eckbach (217.8 km^{2})
- Isenach (294.9 km^{2})
- Speyerbach (595.8 km^{2})
  - Hochspeyerbach (119.3 km^{2})
  - Speyerbach
  - Modenbach (84.1 km^{2})
- Queich (271.2 km^{2})
  - Wellbach (59.3 km^{2})
  - Queich
  - Eisbach (49.8 km^{2})
- Michelsbach/Otterbach
  - Klingbach (130.2 km^{2})
  - Erlenbach (109.1 km^{2})
  - Otterbach (119.2 km^{2})
- Lauter (382.3 km^{2})
  - Wieslauter
  - Salzbach (Lauter) (52.4 km^{2})
- Saarbach (805.5 km^{2})
- (Moder (1720 km^{2}) – catchment area goes to immediately on the state border)

The river system of the Schwarzbach is the only one in the forest that drains into the river Moselle. The Waldlauter and Alsenz drain into the Nahe (the Lauter via the Glan), all the other systems, arranged from north to south, drain directly into the Rhine.

The Palatine Watershed, the drainage divide between the Rhine (Upper Rhine) and Moselle (Middle Rhine) comes from the Sickingen Heights in the west and reaches the northern Palatine Forest immediately west and south of the city of Kaiserslautern where it turns southeast. From Johanniskreuz it runs initially southwards – passing the Eschkopf and Mosisberg to the west – and then bends southwest in the area of the Hortenkopf; in this direction it continues via Gräfenstein Castle, Lemberg and forester's lodge, Forsthaus Hohe List, before finally leaving German soil at the Erlenkopf southeast of Eppenbrunn (see map). It follows various ridges that are interconnected and separate the river system of the Schwarzbach from all the other drainage systems mentioned here.

=== Features ===
==== Haardt sandstone ====
On the eastern edge of the mountains, a light yellow, bleached sandstone may be found in several places. This used to be quarried near Bad Bergzabern, Frankweiler and Hambach in large quarries and is still being quarried today near Leistadt and Haardt. The reddish iron oxide was released by hot fluids that rose up through the fault zone between the Palatine Forest and the Rhine Graben, and so bleached the sandstone.

==== Former volcanic activity at the Pechsteinkopf ====
53 million years ago tensions in the earth's crust and mantle (see Laying down of the bunter sandstone), so that magma was able to rise and break out onto the surface along the fractures. During an initial explosive phase an explosive funnel (Sprengtrichter) formed which filled with loose volcanic material. This was followed, during a second phase, by more magma rising to the surface in a less active and effusive (non-explosive) form, so that, in the pipe of the volcano, dark, vertical or inclined basalt columns were formed. These rock deposits may be clearly seen today on the site of an old Hartstein quarry.

== Biology ==
=== Vegetation ===
Woodland is the dominant landscape element of the Palatine Forest as its name suggests, making up 82 percent of its total area and as much as 90 percent in the central region.

==== Forest history ====
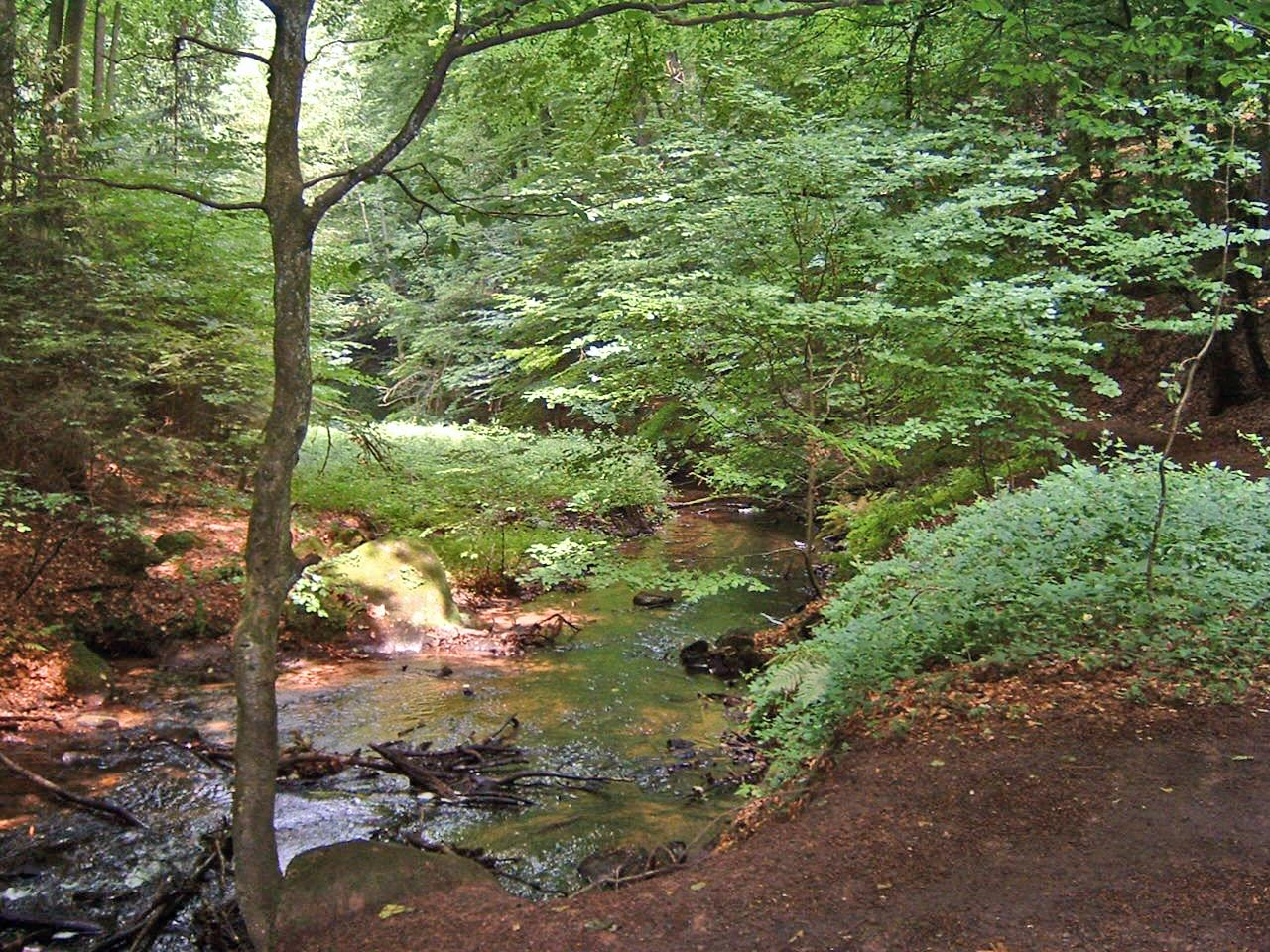
Beech stands that resemble ancient forest in the Karlstal valley

At the end of the last ice age, about 10,000 years ago, the region of the Palatine Forest was covered with tundra-like vegetation, amongst which, initially, undemanding tree species such as pine and birch were able to spread as the climate gradually warmed up (the "pine-birch" period). As climatic conditions improved these species were followed by hazel, oak and lime (the "hazel and oak period"). From the 3rd millennium a more Atlantic-influenced climate evolved, which was cooler and wetter, so that now beech characterised the forest scenery. The oak and beech mixed woods, typical of the current period, emerged, the pines being forced back into those areas that were either less favourable, very wet or very dry places, but remained part of the natural woodland.

This ecological balance was permanently destroyed, however, by the colonization and clearing of woodland that took place during the Middle Ages. Clearance by burning, the use of land for the production of straw and the unrestricted exploitation of the forest for raw materials and fuel led, little by little, to the devastation of wide areas of woodland, something that reached its peak in the 17th and 18th centuries (see Settlement history). This situation made the introduction of properly regulated forest management pressingly urgent – management that not only put a priority on controlled exploitation, but above all on care and sustainability. So in the 18th and 19th centuries, cleared land was reforested, mainly with undemanding, rapid-growing pines, which were followed in the 19th century by other non-native coniferous species such as spruce, larch, Weymouth pine and Douglas fir. In the Palatine Forest, this regulated management produced mixed woodland, in which coniferous trees formed around two-thirds of the total stock in areas that had historically comprised mainly oak and beech. Not until recent decades were there increasing attempts to turn larger areas of the forest into near-natural mixed woodland with a better ratio of deciduous to coniferous trees of around 50% (see adjacent table).

==== Current situation ====
Predominant tree species by percentage	1959	2008	Trend
Pine	44	34	−
Beech	28	35	+
Spruce	11	9	−
Oak	7	9	+
Larch	4	3	−
Douglas fir	2	6	+
Sweet chestnut	1	1	=
Silver fir	1	1	=

The beech is not only the most abundant tree species in the Palatinate Forest historically, but also today, with a current share of 35 percent. With the exception of the eastern mountain edge (the Haardt range), it is widely distributed on the acidic environment of the bunter sandstone soils and prefers shady slopes, high elevations and hollows. Often it forms varied mixed stands of trees together with softwoods, especially pine, but it is also found as stands in its own right (in so-called woodrush-beech woods), particularly in the central Palatinate Forest. Here it grows in large "beech cathedrals", which are seen by many visitors as an impressive feature of the Palatinate Forest.

In addition to beech, the oak is another characteristic tree of the Palatinate Forest, albeit botanically speaking they are mainly sessile oak rather than English oak. It is the main tree species of larger, sometimes centuries-old, stands in the regions around Johanniskreuz, Eschkopf and Weißenberg and may also be found further south between Fischbach and Eppenbrunn, where, as well as the plateaus of the central Palatinate Forest, it prefers sunnier slopes (west to south-east facing slopes). But in the rest of Palatinate Forest, it is on the increase and usually forms, together with beech, often very natural, primeval, mixed forest (natural forest), which enjoys special protection as a core zone of the Palatine Forest-North Vosges Biosphere Reserve (see biosphere reserve). In addition, from a forestry point of view the oaks of the Palatinate Forest are a particularly high priority because the wood veneer produced from them is recognized worldwide as being of unique quality.

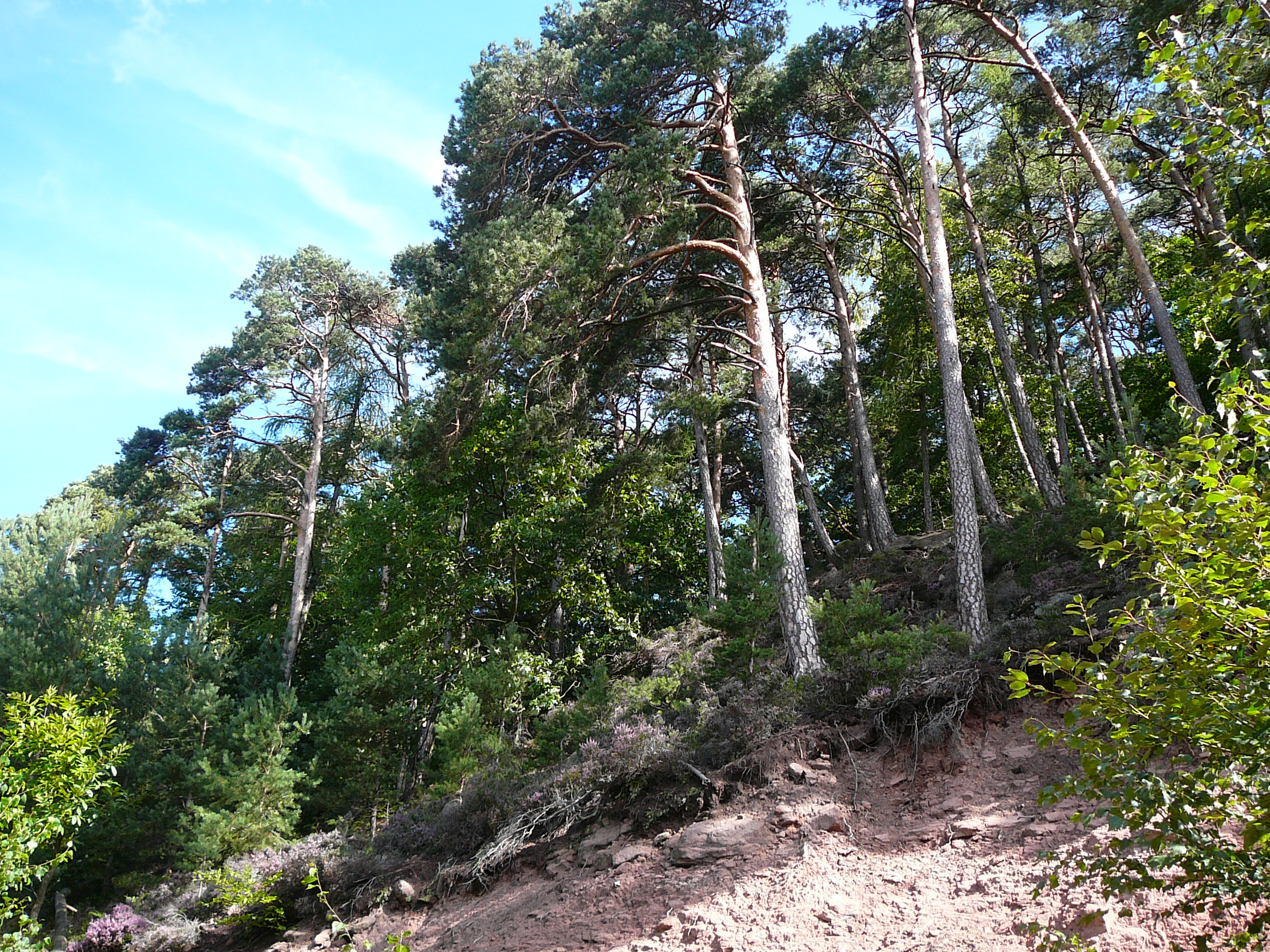
A pine stand, almost 200 years old, on the northwest slopes of the Rehberg

Despite the decline in its share of the total tree population from 44 to 34 percent in 2008, the pine continues to be a dominant species of the low mountain range. This is due to the historical background, especially in the Haardt area, where they once heavily dominated the scene with 60 to 70 percent share of the forest. It is traditionally planted on dry, sunny, south-facing slopes. Like oak and beech it is an autochthonous member of the forest community, although for the purposes of reforesting devastated areas (see forest history) pine species from other regions have been introduced and mixed with indigenous species. In Waldleiningen in the mid-Palatinate Forest and on the peaty soils at Bitche in the French part of the biosphere reserve "relict" pine forests have survived, in which the character of the original pine forest can be vividly seen.

The silver fir also plays a special role in this context. Although, it only covers about 1 percent in the Palatinate Forest as a whole, it is much more common in the south where it comprises some 7 percent of the woodland. It occurs in many stands alongside beech, pine and other species in mixed woodland and often dominates the appearance of the forest. Because it forms the northernmost element of the great beech-fir forests typical of the Vosges Mountains, the moisture-loving silver fir is counted as one of the indigenous tree species of the Palatinate Forest. Waterside ash woodland and the rarer alder woodland, which are found mainly in valleys and wetlands, are also typical vegetation for the Atlantic-influenced climate of the Palatinate Forest (see Climate) as well as being representative of the original forest.

By contrast, spruce, Douglas fir, larch, and Weymouth pine are not native to the forested mountain range. Spruce prefer cool, shady locations and are therefore often found in valleys, hollows and on the lower slopes of hills, while the Douglas fir is found in widely differing locations due to its high adaptability. The sweet chestnut was not originally an indigenous tree species, but was naturalized by the Romans in the area of the present-day Palatinate. Since it prefers a mild climate (see temperature) like the grape vine it is found on the eastern edge of the Palatinate Forest, the Haardt, in pure or nearly monocultures and represents about 4 percent of the forest area there.

===== Other vegetation =====
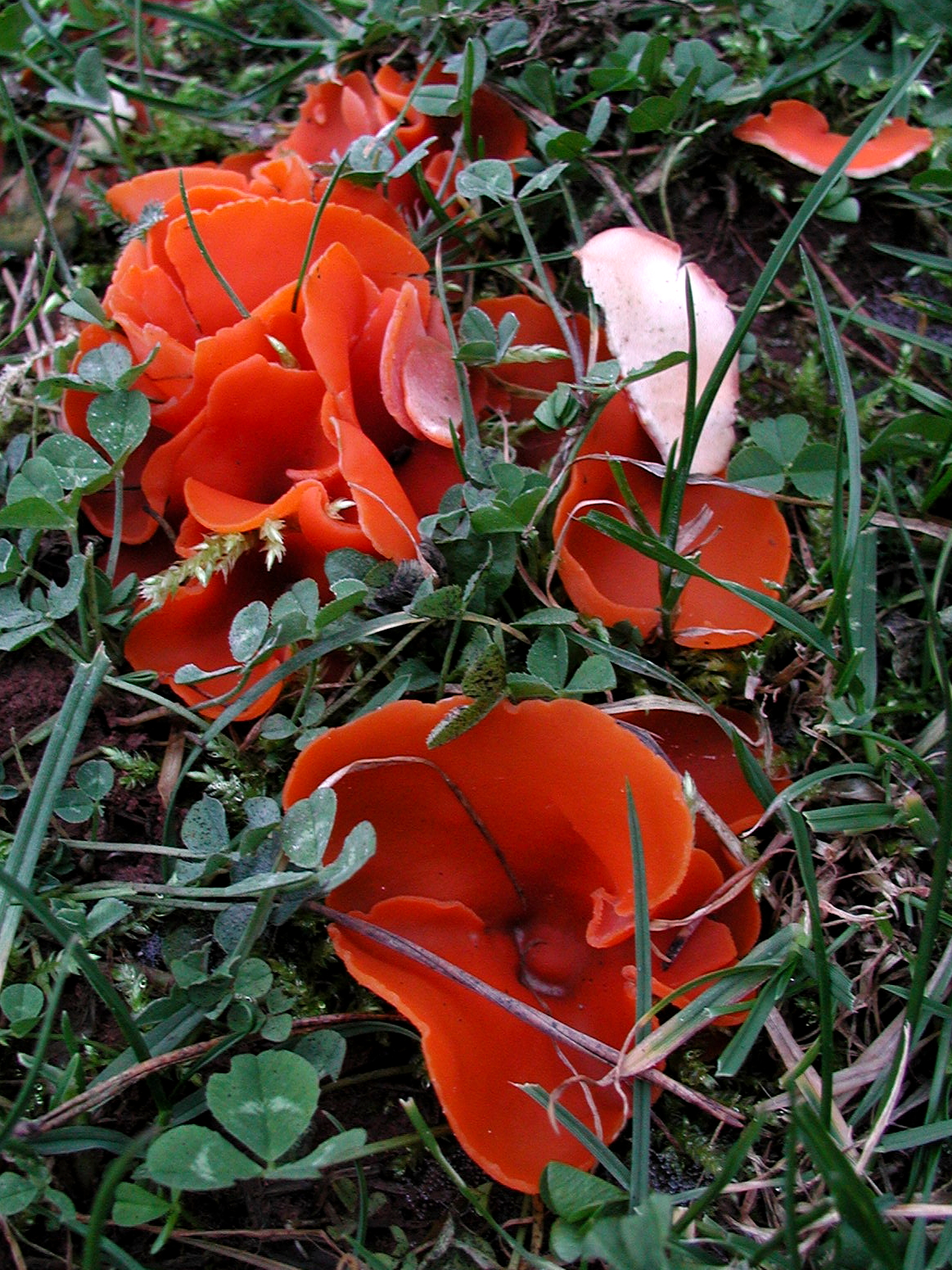
Orange peel fungus in a clearing in the Palatine Forest

In the species-poor oak, beech and pine woods the ground flora mainly consists of acid-soil loving (acidophilic) species. Examples are great wood-rush, white wood-rush, pill sedge and wavy hair-grass. Also characteristic are various species of fern such as deer fern, lemon-scented fern and royal fern, which prefer shady, temperate, wet locations. Another feature of the bunter sandstone mountains are its rich mushroom and berry communities. Blueberries cover large areas and, in suitable places, cowberries.

Heather grows on dry, sandy soils alongside paths and in clearings as do plants such as German greenweed and broom, and the rare lance-shaped bellflower, whilst by the many brooks and wet meadows acid-loving marsh plants such as bog arum, marsh cinquefoil, bog bean and bog pondweed may be seen, all of which are rare in other regions of Germany. In addition reeds, marsh willowherb, marsh marigold and meadowsweet and, in dryer places also grey willow, eared willow and alder buckthorn, illustrate the variety that may be found in the marsh meadows alongside streams and brooks.

=== Fauna ===
The large mixed forests of the mountain range with their various plant communities form an ecological framework in which a large and varied range of animals was able to develop. Particularly striking are the larger mammals which, as in other mountainous regions, are represented by cloven-hoofed animals like the roe deer, red deer and wild boar. Fox, badger, polecat, weasel and threatened mammal species such as bats, pine marten, European wildcat and Eurasian lynx are also found in the Palatinate Forest.

This is also true for a number of rare birds, including the hoopoe, kingfisher, wheatear, black woodpecker, whinchat and stonechat. Whilst the strictly protected peregrine falcon has been resident in the rock country of the Wasgau for several decades, hazel grouse and capercaillie appear to have died out in the Palatine Forest region. Typical autumn and winter species include the brambling and chaffinch, which overwinter here and occupy the woods in large flocks. They used to be hunted with blowpipes at night during the so-called Böhämmer Hunt (Böhämmer-Jagd), until this sport was ended by the 1936 Conservation Act.

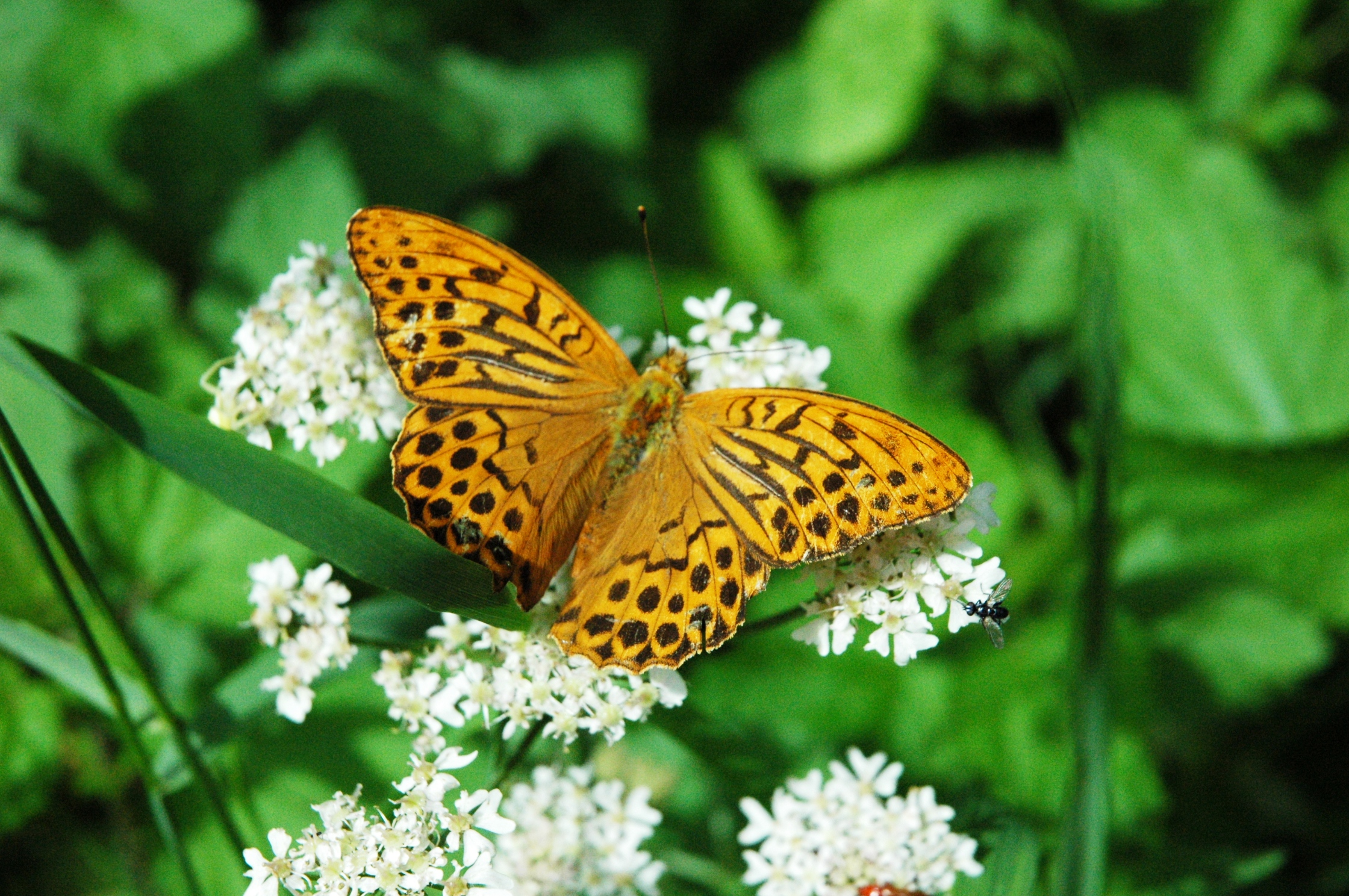
The silver-washed fritillary, the largest central European fritillary, in the Palatine Forest

The forest is home to a sizeable population of amphibians and reptiles, as well as a host of beetles, butterflies and other insects. A common sight are great anthills, the nests of wood ants, of which there are several species in the region. The Wasgau and the area of the Hermersberger Hof are two of the few places in Germany where colonies of narrow-headed ant have survived. And the highly endangered great and spotted antlions may often be seen in the sands of the bunter sandstone (Rehberg beds). Their larvae build funnel traps in the sand and feed on ants and other animals that fall into it using their pincer-like mandibles.

Thanks to the sparse population of the forest and the filter action of bunter sandstone, many springs and streams in the hills have retained their natural water quality, so that they remain healthy habitats for many species of fish. These include brown trout and brook lamprey and, in calmer waters, minnow, spined loach and stone loach. In larger meadow streams grayling, perch, pike, burbot und various other minnow-like species may be found. Dragonflies, such as the golden-ringed dragonfly and the otherwise rare northern damselfly, may often be seen by streams and ponds.

== Notable locations ==
=== Castles ===
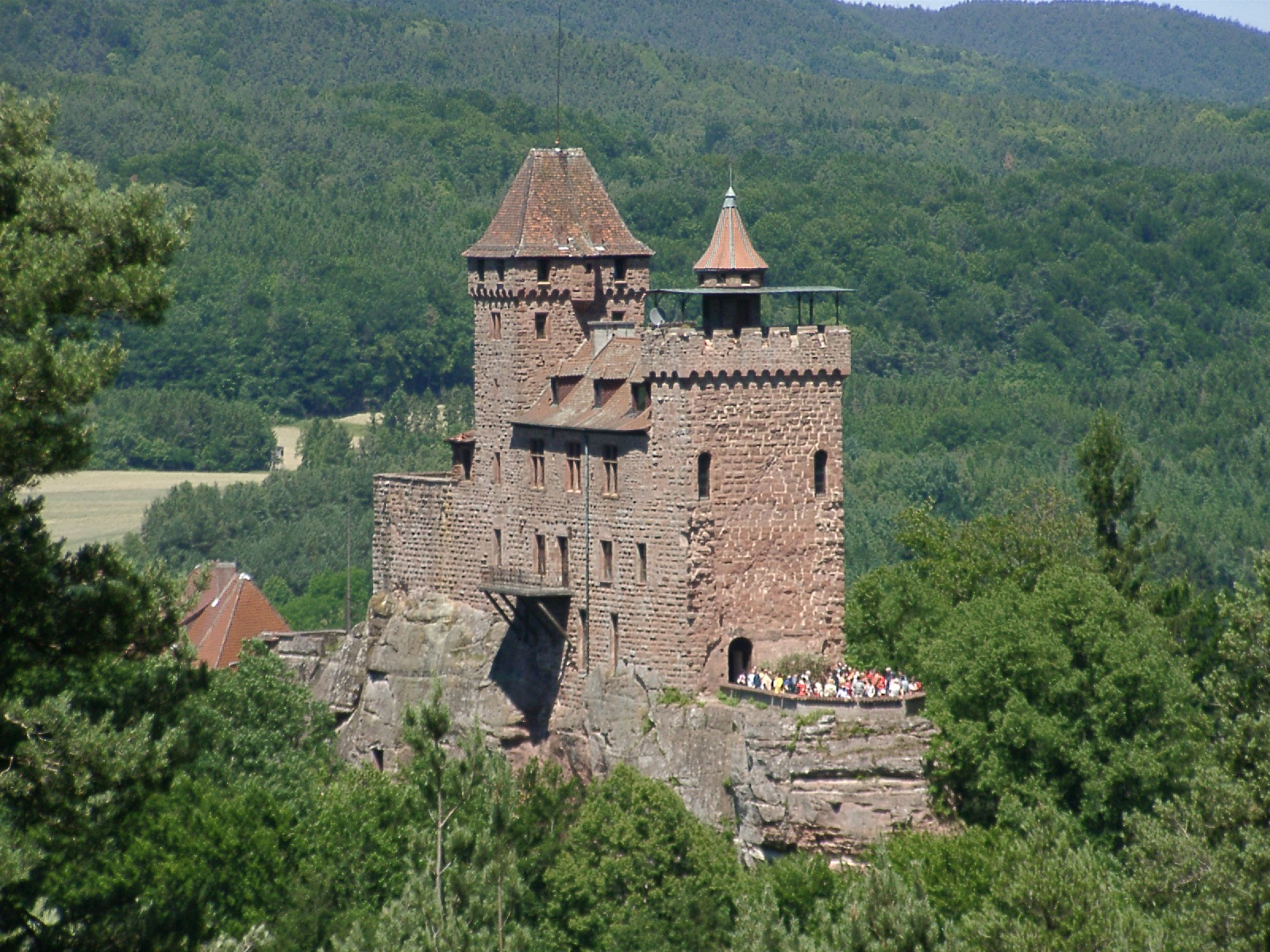
The occupied rock castle of Berwartstein in the Wasgau

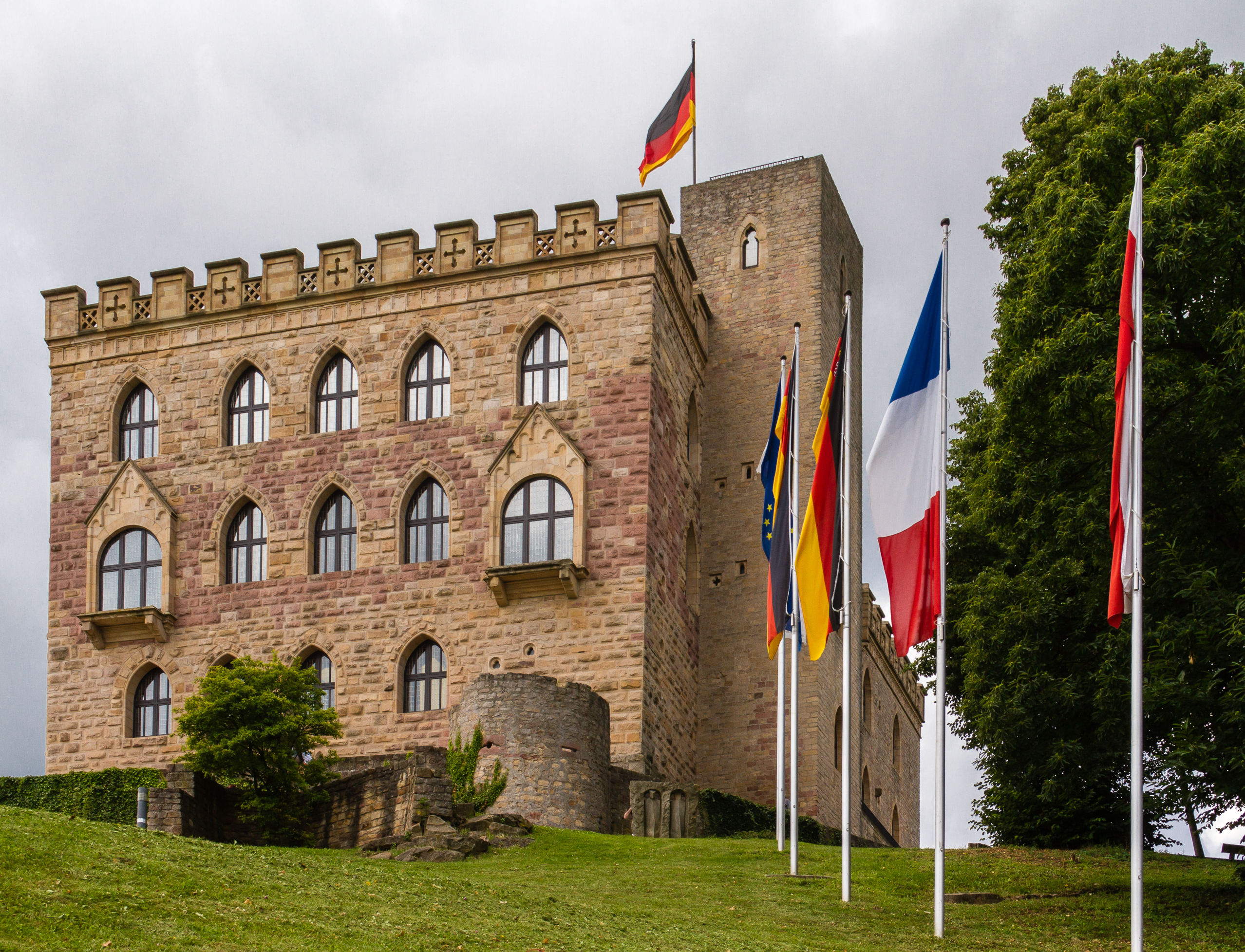
Hambach Castle

The Palatinate Forest has a large number of castles and stately houses. Worthy of mention is the imperial castle of Trifels near Annweiler, where, at the end of the 12th century, the English king, Richard the Lionheart, was held prisoner; in the wake of which the Blondel legend arose. Today it is where replicas of the Imperial Regalia (Reichskleinodien) of the Holy Roman Empire of the German Nation can be viewed, and is one of the most popular tourist destinations in the Palatinate.

On the eastern edge of the Palatinate Forest, in the borough of Neustadt an der Weinstraße above the village of the same, is Hambach Castle, which was the scene of the Hambach Festival in 1832 and has since been seen as a symbol of democracy. Several kilometres further south, near Edenkoben, is the Villa Ludwigshöhe, built in the mid-19th century and used as a summer residence of the Bavarian king Ludwig I.

Berwartstein Castle, near Erlenbach in the southern part of the Palatinate Forest, once belonged to the knight, Hans von Trotha, known in local legends as Hans Trapp, and is the only castle in the Palatinate that is still occupied. The castle has been rebuilt and is open to visitors. Of many other castles, like Wegelnburg, only ruins are left. Other rock castles include Drachenfels near Busenberg, which partly belonged to rebel knight, Francis of Sickingen, Falkenburg and the Wilgartaburg near Wilgartswiesen.

The lords of the House of Leiningen ruled over the northeastern Palatine Forest; the significant buildings there of this aristocratic family were the castles of Altleiningen and Neuleiningen near Grünstadt and the castle of Hardenburg near Bad Dürkheim. Other castles in the region that belonged to the Leiningens were Gräfenstein near Merzalben in the western part of the range and Erfenstein in the Elmstein valley.

One unusual group of castles are the castles of Dahn near the eponymous town. This group comprises the castles of Altdahn, Grafendahn and Tanstein, which were built at different times, but erected immediately one after another on a rocky ridge.

The castle information centre at Lemberg Castle not only informs visitors about the multi-faceted, detail of the history, architecture and life in a medieval castle, but also gives a comprehensive overview of the other rock castles in the present-day border region with France.

=== Natural monuments ===
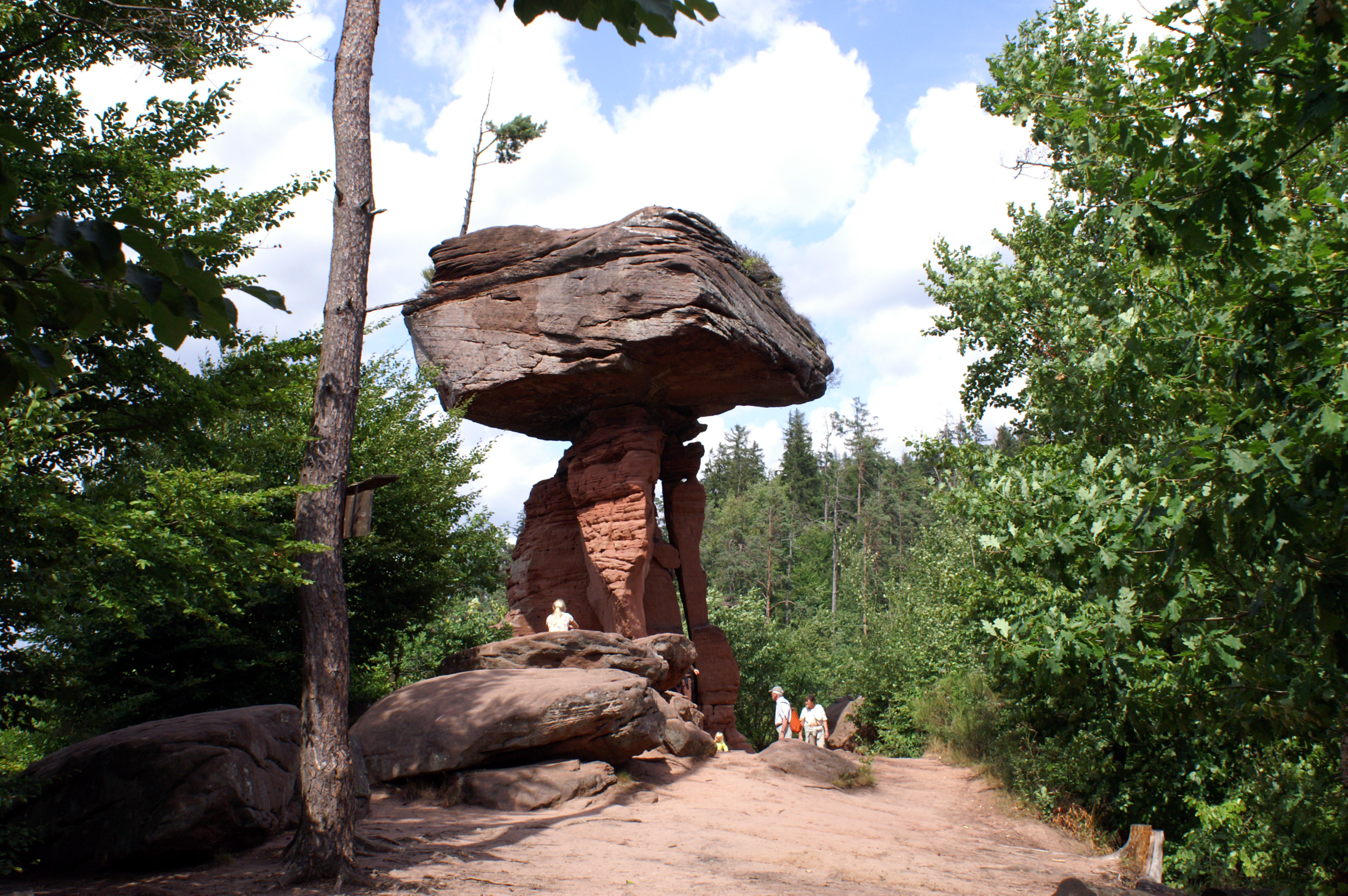
The Devil's Table

The Karlstal valley, through which run the upper reaches of the Moosalb river near the town of Trippstadt, is known for its natural, virgin scenery. The Trippstadt village of Johanniskreuz is the centre point of the Palatine Forest and used to be a spa. The 200‑ to 300‑year‑old oak and beech mixed woods, which surround the little hamlet and give it an autochthonous character, are locally renowned (see Flora). They have long been managed following sustainability principles and are known for their valuable stands of furniture-quality oak. The House of Sustainability was established in Johanniskreuz in 2005 (viz. Information centres/Museums)

Other ancient forest-like cells of natural woodland may be found in the source region of the (Wies)-Lauter below the Weißenberg in one of the core zones of the biosphere reserve as well as the border area between Eppenbrunn, Stürzelbronn, Fischbach and Obersteinbach.

The southern Palatinate Forest contains over 200 rock formations of all shapes and sizes (see also Geology and Geomorphology), which give visitors a good insight into the geology of the region, but also the surprising adaptability of sandstone rock vegetation, especially the heathers, the undemanding grasses, and the deformed Scots pine trees. Another feature of this biotope are peregrine falcons, which nest in the rocks and are under strict conservation measures (including access restrictions for climbers and walkers).

Well-known rock formations in the Dahner Felsenland ("Dahn Rock Country") are the Devil's Table near Hinterweidenthal, the Jungfernsprung, the Hochstein and the two pinnacles of the Bride and Groom, which all lie in the area around the little town of Dahn. The region around Annweiler and Gossersweiler has formations like the Asselstein, the Luger Friedrichsfels, the Hundsfels and the Rödelstein near Vorderweidenthal. Another important natural monument is the Altschlossfelsen on the Brechenberg near Eppenbrunn in the southwestern corner of the Palatine Forest near the Franco-German border. This is a roughly two kilometre long rock terrace, the largest of its kind in the forest and on which there is clear evidence of the erosion and weathering processes typical of bunter sandstone (e. g. honeycomb weathering).

In order to open up this rock landscape to walkers, in recent years a range of themed trails has been established, of which the Rodalb Rock Trail (Rodalber Felsenweg), the Dahn Rock Path (Dahner Felsenpfad), the Busenberg Clog Path (Busenberger Holzschuhpfad), and the Hauenstein Cobblers' Path (Hauensteiner Schusterpfad) should be mentioned (see Walking). Whilst most rocks are only really accessible to climbers, certain rock terraces may also be reached on foot (e. g. the Buhlsteine, Heidenpfeiler and Rötzenstein) or with the aid of ladders provided care is taken (e. g. the Hühnerstein near Hauenstein).

=== Information centres and museums ===
==== Information centres ====
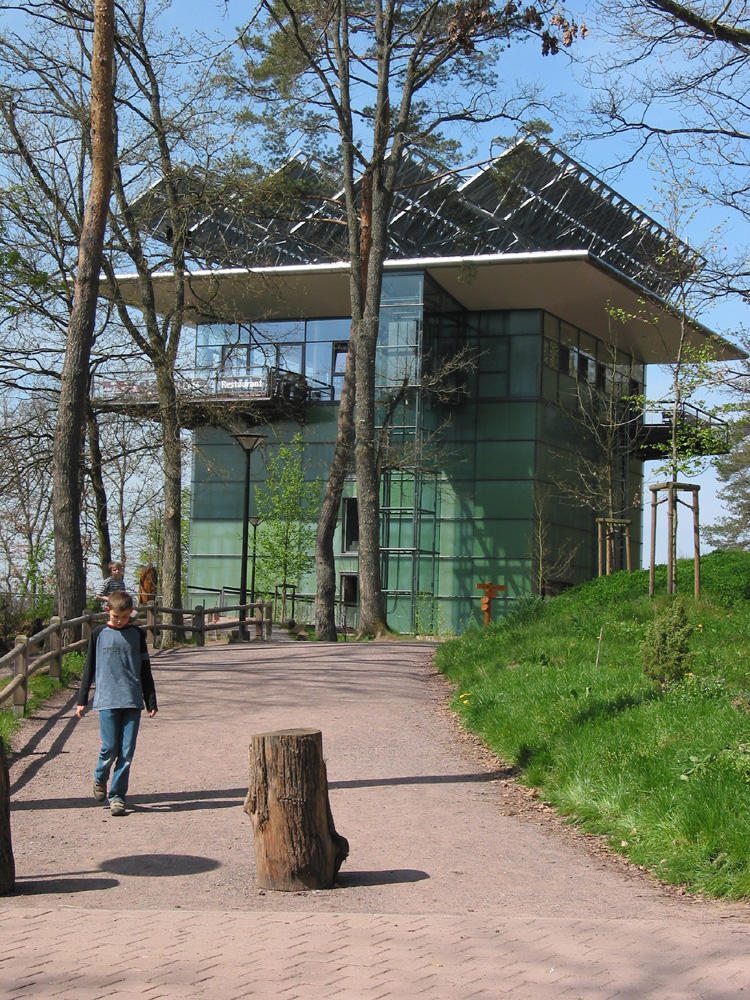
The biosphere house near Fischbach

The biosphere reserve has three information centres with different emphases, in which the visitor can learn about the geology, climate, fauna and flora, history and culture of the bunter sandstone mountains with the aid of exhibitions as well as events of all kinds. Ecological considerations are given primacy. On the German side, these include the House of Sustainability in Johanniskreuz (see also Natural monuments) and the Palatine Forest / North Vosges Biosphere House near Fischbach in the Wasgau. The latter, in addition to a multimedia exhibition, also has a treetop trail, and water and biosphere experience walks. In La Petite-Pierre (German: Lützelstein) in a castle-like building, which was built on the ruins of Luetzelstein Castle, is the administrative centre of the regional nature park of North Vosges (French: Parc naturel régional des Vosges du Nord), in which the visitor can learn, in ways similar to those at the German centres, about the natural world of the Vosges sandstone mountains; in addition, there is also an emphasis on the social and cultural aspects of the region.

==== Museums ====
Only a small selection can be mentioned here of the many museums with a direct link to the Palatine Forest that may be found in the Palatinate alone (see detailed coverage by the Rhineland-Palatinate Museum Association, Museumsverband Rheinland-Pfalz).

The Palatine Museum of Natural History (Pfalzmuseum für Naturkunde) or POLLICHIA Museum in Bad Dürkheim, has various permanent exhibitions and collections on the subjects of geology, flora and fauna of the Palatinate (e. g. animals of the forest, local mushrooms, minerals etc.) and other special conservation themes, with ecological considerations as a priority. In this connexion the visitor is also introduced to the Palatinate Forest-North Vosges Biosphere Reserve in a comprehensive permanent exhibition with vivid displays of the particular features of these bunter sandstone mountains.

The History Museum of the Palatinate (Historisches Museum der Pfalz) in Speyer, because of its broader scope, does not cover the region of today's Palatinate Forest as a separate exhibition topic; nevertheless the specific Palatine focus of the museum means almost inevitably that there are historical links through which the political and socio-historic changes of the mountain region are illustrated time and again. Examples are the Salian exhibition of 2011 (Trifels was the centre of the Salian Empire), the wine museum with its cultural history of wine and the family-friendly, hands-on exhibition of Drachenfels Castle, in which life on a medieval rock fortress in Wasgau can be relived.

The Dynamikum in Pirmasens is the first science museum or science centre in Rhineland-Palatinate. In April 2008, an interactive museum was founded in the building of the old Rheinberger shoe factory. Under the theme of "movement", 150 interactive experimental stations demonstrate fundamental physical, mathematical and biological laws. The museum is particularly aimed at younger visitors to help make them aware of scientific principles.

The Max Slevogt Art Gallery in Villa Ludwigshöhe contains, inter alia, paintings by Impressionist masters that reflect the rich colours of the southern Palatinate countryside, which may be experienced, for example, at Slevogthof Neukastel above Leinsweiler. A particularly good overview of the rocks and rock castles of Palatine and Alsace Wasgau is conveyed by the "impressions" of artist, Emil Knöringer, who seeks to emphasise the richness of the red sandstone landscapes through the medium of art.

=== Industrial heritage ===
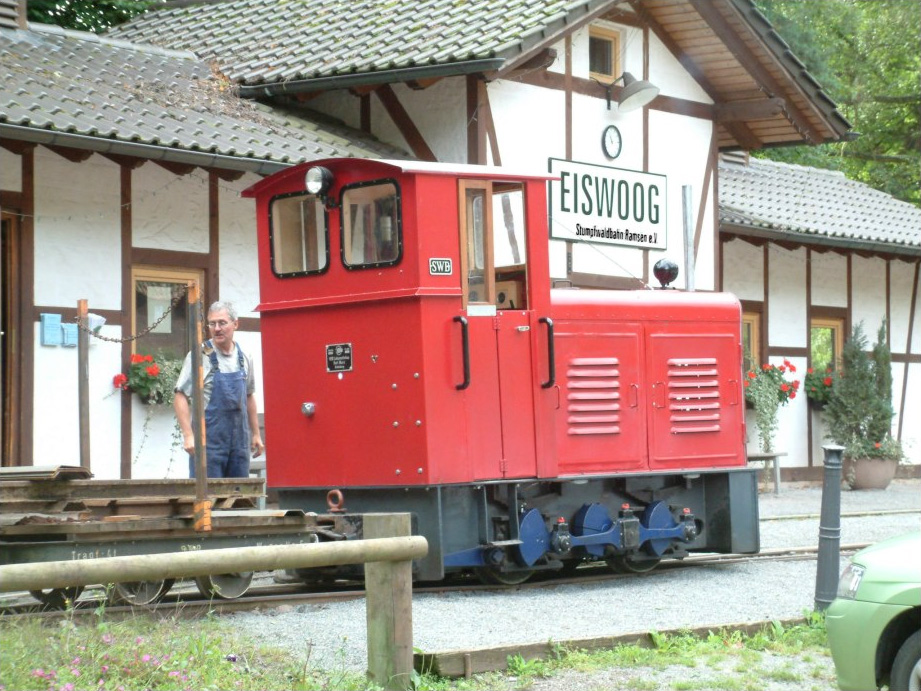
A diesel locomotive on the Stumpfwald Railway

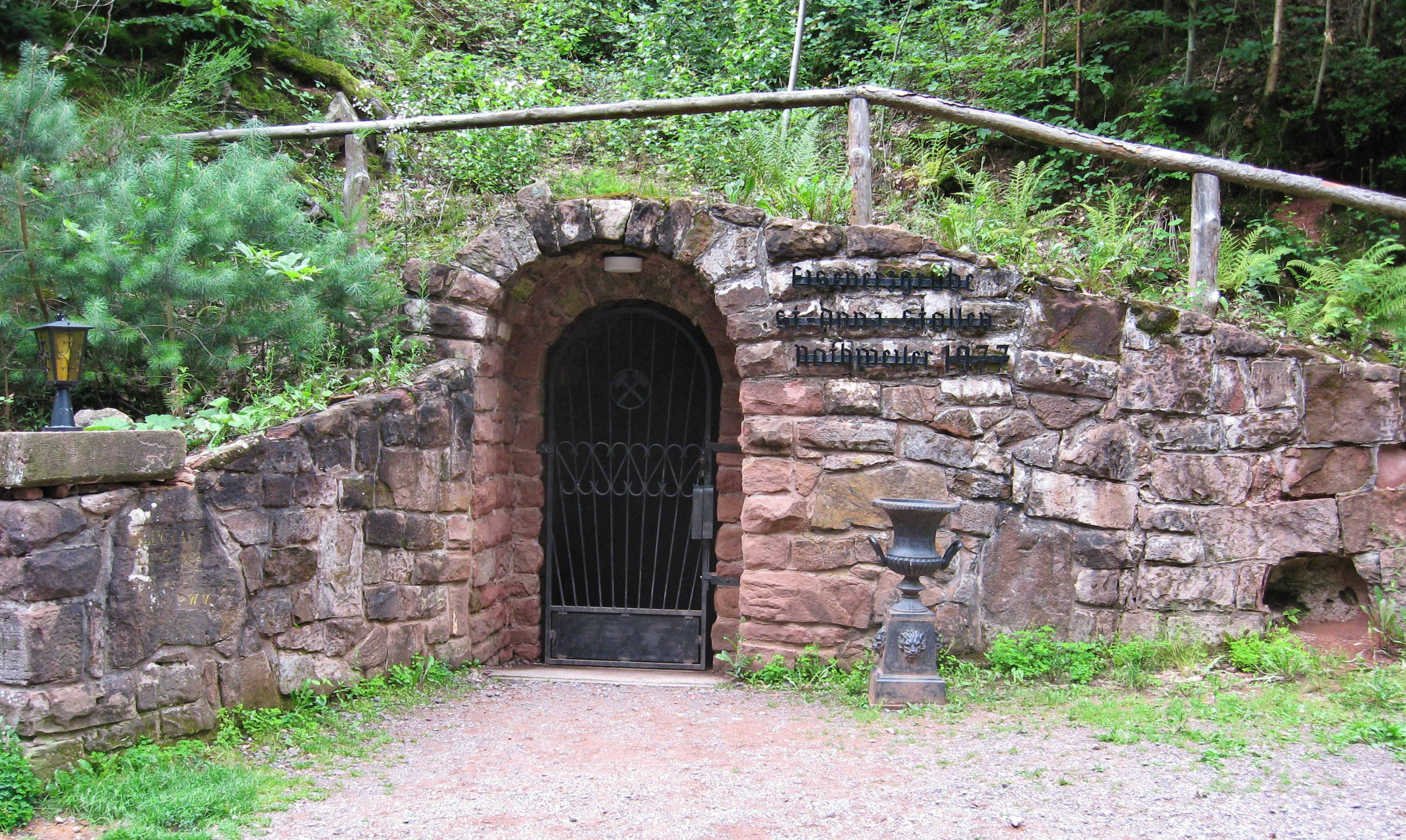
The St. Anna gallery in Nothweiler

Examples of industrial heritage include the Stumpfwald Railway at Ramsen, a heritage Feldbahn since 1996, as well as the Little Cuckoo Railway (see Transport), which has been worked by historic steam trains since 1984 and operates services from March to October at weekends between Neustadt and Elmstein. In addition, there is a good overview of nearly 150 years of Palatine railway history at the German Railway Museum in Neustadt which has numerous exhibits.

The German Shoe Museum in Hauenstein documents the manufacture of shoes, in earlier times a very common activity in the Pirmasens area, and set it within the larger industrial and socio-historical context. In the building of a former shoe factory, old shoe-making machinery and other manufacturing technology may be viewed and the changes in shoe production experienced vividly (see the history of settlement)

Interesting insights into the sorts of old trades and crafts that used to be found in the Palatinate Forest, are provided by several museums, including the Brushmakers' Museum (Bürstenbindermuseum) in Ramberg; this uses a variety of exhibits to illustrate the industrial and social development that has taken over the past few centuries in the Ramberg valley.

In the ore mine of St. Anne's Gallery in Nothweiler visitors can join a guided tour of important mining activities and so witness the working conditions of past centuries. This insight may then be enhanced in the Information Centre of the visitor mine.

=== Wildlife parks ===
Over 400 wild animals of 15 European species may be found on the extensive terrain of the Südliche Weinstraße Wildlife Park, and there are also various children-oriented activities. A comparable attraction is the Kurpfalz Park near Wachenheim in the northern Palatine Forest.

=== Aerial cableways ===
The Rietburgbahn, a chairlift up the Rietburg hill near Edenkoben, from where there is a good view of the Rhine Plain, and the Bad Dürkheim Gondola Lift, which from 1973 to 1981 went up the Teufelsstein and which is planned to re-open are two aerial cableways on the eastern edge of the Palatinate Forest.

=== Outdoor recreation ===
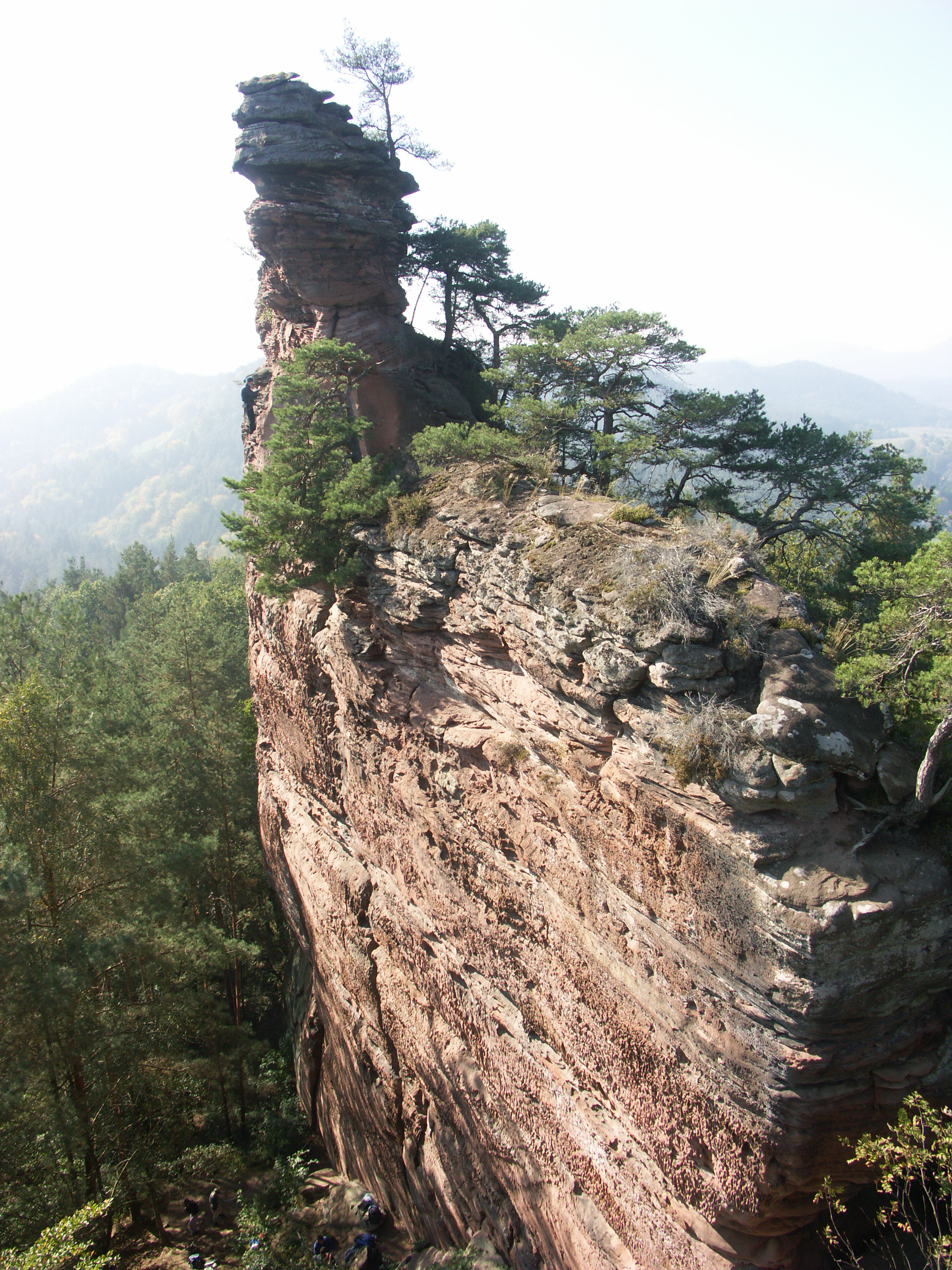
Climbers at the foot of the Pferchfeldturm

The Palatinate Forest is an attractive region for hiking, offering an extensive network of trails.

In 2005, the Palatine Forest Mountain Bike Park, a route network for mountainbiking, was developed in the centre of the region.

Climbers appreciate the red sandstone rocks in the Dahner Felsenland.

== Walking ==
Since the beginning of the last century, the Palatine Forest has developed into a very popular walking region, thanks to its natural landscape attractions, its cultural heritage and good infrastructure, primarily created by the Palatine Forest Club. It offers over 100 managed walking huts and similar facilities run by volunteers of the Palatine Forest Club and the Friends of Nature. The walking support centres are often only accessible on foot and mainly open at weekends.

=== Walking routes ===
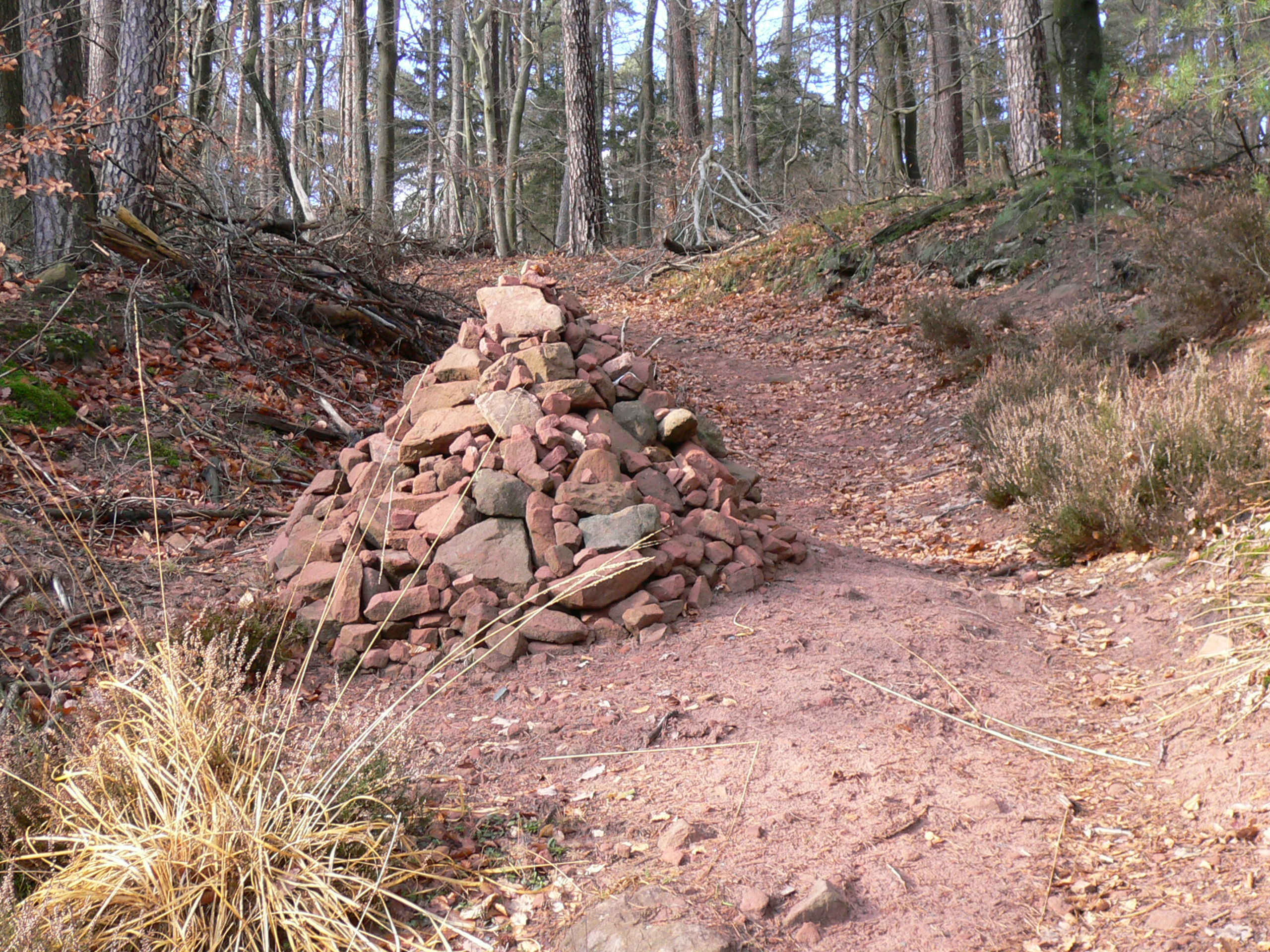
A cairn used as a waypoint on an unsigned path to the forest house of Lambertskreuz

The mountain range is criss-crossed by a dense network of signed trails, over 12,000 kilometres in overall length, most of which were established by volunteers of the Palatine Forest Club, who continue to maintain them. These include several important international and national long-distance paths that link the forest to the European and national networks of long-distance trails.

Well known examples include the Palatine St. James Way (waymark: scallop on blue field), the Pirmasens – Belfort long-distance path (waymark: yellow bar) or the Franconia-Hesse-Palatinate (Franken – Hessen – Kurpfalz) long-distance path (waymark: red cross). These main walking routes are complemented by a multitude of regional footpaths of varying length (both linear and circular trails), which include themed walks (e. g. forest educational trails), rock trails (e. g. the Rodalber Felsenweg), river and lakeside trails (e. g. the Brunnenweg near Heltersberg etc.) and the so-called "premium" or "predicate" trails initiated by the Palatine Tourist Board (e. g. Pfälzer Waldsteig or Felsenland Sagenweg etc.). Cross-border hikes are also easily possible in the bunter sandstone hills, because the Palatine Forest Club and its French counterpart the Vosges Club (French: Club Vosgien) have developed almost identical waymarking systems since their foundation over 100 years (e. g. dots, bars, crosses and diamonds of different colours) and in the border region have developed a dense common network of footpaths. In doing so, both clubs have been careful to ensure that, where possible, the routes do not follow "forest motorways" but use narrow footpaths and mountain paths.

=== Viewing points ===
==== Viewing towers ====
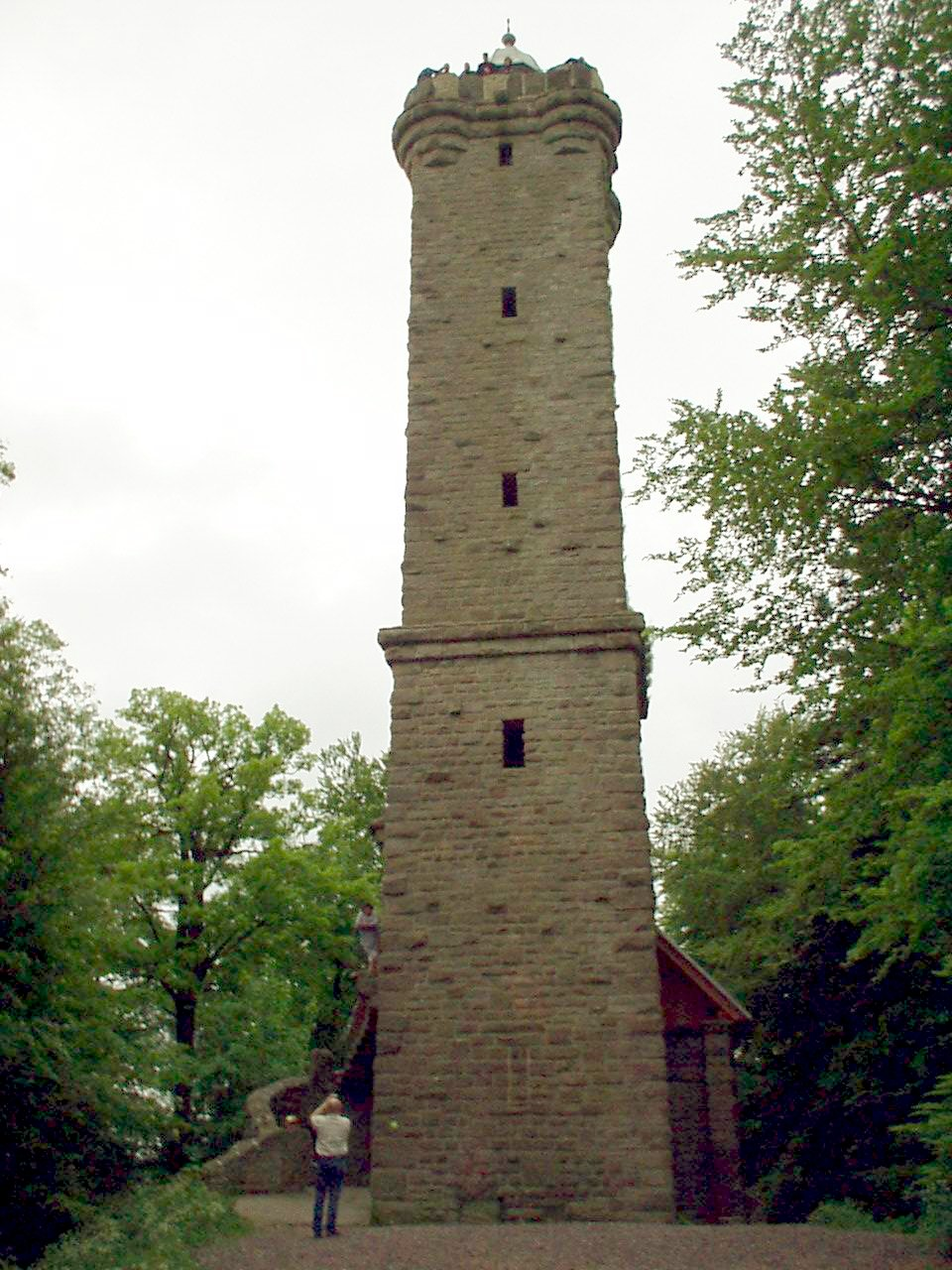
The Luitpold Tower on the Weißenberg mountain

In the northeastern part of the range the following destinations are worth mentioning: the Eckkopf Tower (near Deidesheim), Bismarck Tower (near Bad Dürkheim) and the observation tower on the Weinbiet. The visitor has a good all-round view, especially to the north and east that reaches as far as the Odenwald. In the central and southern part of the range, examples of good viewing towers include the Schänzel on the Steigerkopf, the Rehberg and its tower near Annweiler and the Stäffelsberg Tower near Dörrenbach. The summit pyramid of the Rehberg is especially well known for its panoramic views (see the image in the section above). Representative of the central Palatine Forest are the tower on the Schindhübel near Iggelbach, the one on the Eschkopf and especially the Luitpold Tower near Hermersbergerhof, which offers the most extensive panoramic view of the Palatine Forest by far. According to precise geometric research by Lang over 350 hill and mountain tops may be seen from this point.

==== Rock formations ====
The best known rock formations are the Drachenfels ("Dragon Rock") between the Isenach and Speyerbach valleys and especially the Orensfels near Albersweiler, from which there is an outstanding view over the southeast Wasgau and the county of Südliche Weinstraße. On the Kirschfelsen ("Cherry Rock", near Annweiler Forsthaus) seating has been installed from which the visitor can enjoy a "natural opera" as if in an open-air theatre. The Buhlsteine rocks near Busenberg have an alpine feel, as does the Hühnerstein near Hauenstein, which has been made accessible with ladders and railings and may be climbed with appropriate care.

==== Castles ====
Whilst the Rietburg above Rhodt offers an "observation platform" over the Rhine plain, the rock castles of the Wasgau, e. g. the castle trinity of Trifels, Anebos and Scharfenberg near Annweiler and Lindelbrunn near Vorderweidenthal, enable the variety of the Palatine bunter sandstone hills to be experienced. A 360° panorama of the German and French Wasgau is offered by the Wegelnburg, the highest castle ruins in the Palatinate, near Schönau, and from Gräfenstein Castle near Merzalben the visitor has a good view of the core zone of the biosphere reserve in the western Palatine Forest (see the Castles section).

== See also ==
- Südliche Weinstraße Wildlife Park
