= Betzenberg =

Coordinates: 49°25′59.4986″N 7°47′25.5208″E

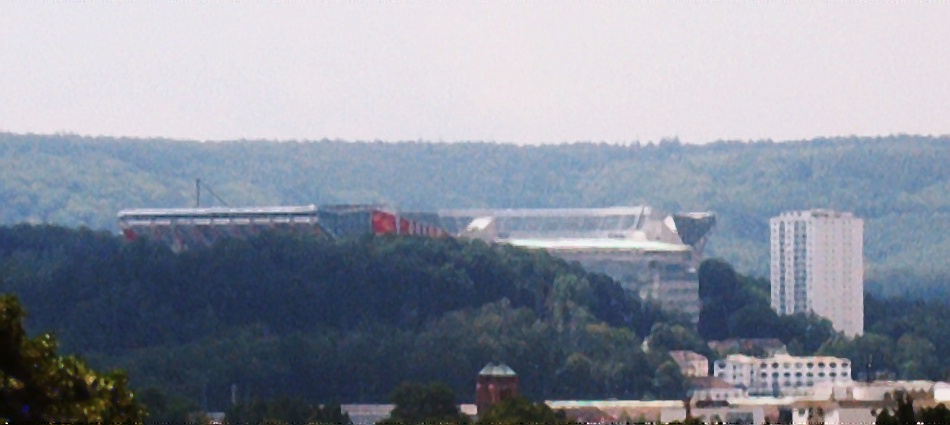
The Fritz Walter Stadium on the Betzenberg

The Betzenberg (German pronunciation: [ˈbɛt͡sn̩ˌbɛʁk]) is a 285-metre-high hill in the German city of Kaiserslautern. It rises about 50 metres above the city and gives its name to the quarter in which it stands. It was well known because it also gave its name to what is now the Fritz Walter Stadium (formerly the Betzenberg Stadium or, colloquially, the Betze).

== Hill ==
The Betzenberg lies south of Kaiserslautern Central Station and the main railway axis from Ludwigshafen to Saarbrücken. The southern end of the Betzenberg transitions into the Palatine Forest.

== City quarter ==
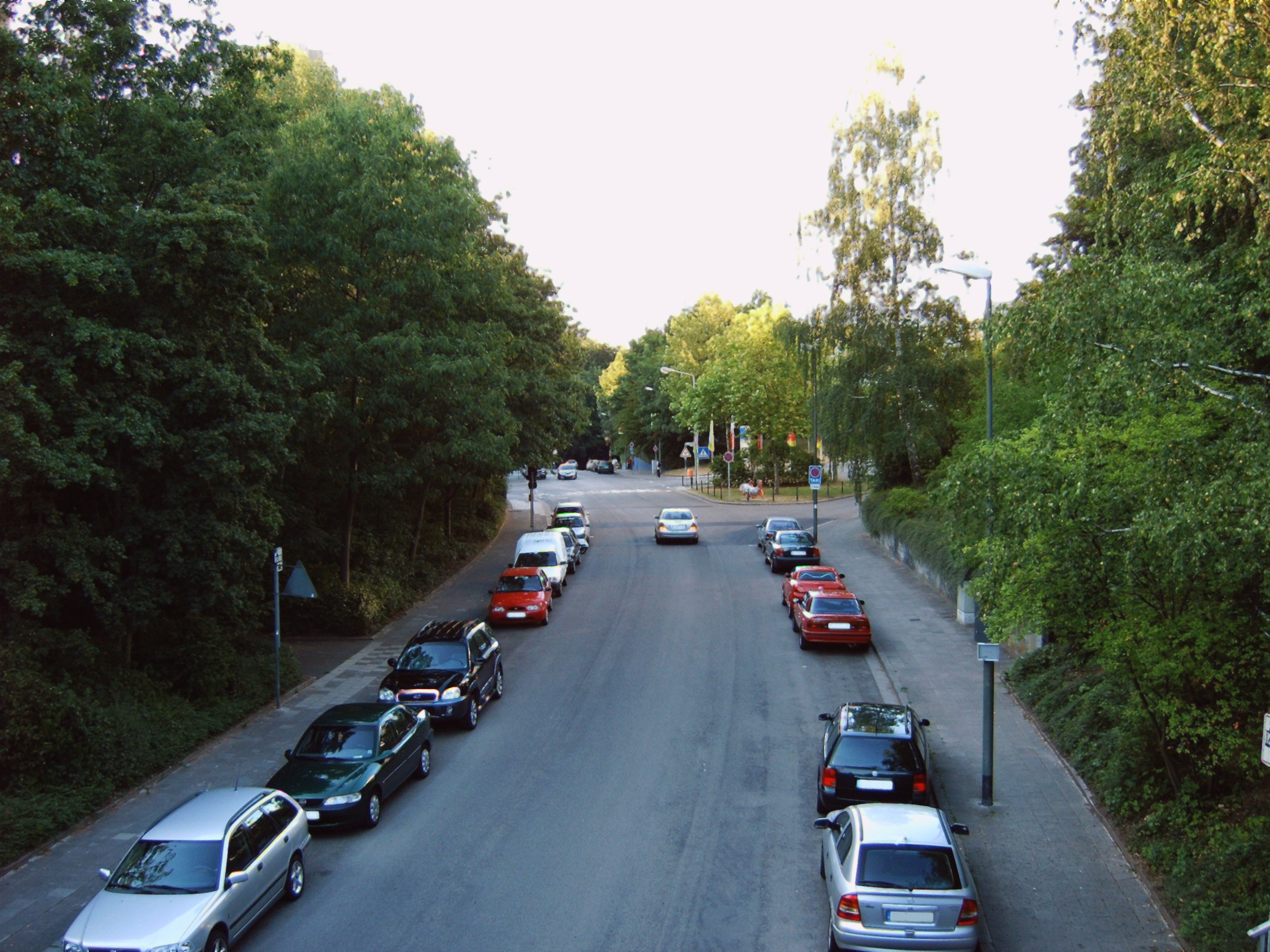
Kantstrasse in the quarter of Betzenberg

Kaiserlautern's Betzenberg quarter is fairly young. It was laid out in 1967; only the built-up area below and around the Fritz Walter Stadium is older. In order to create the district, parts of the former Palatinate Forest protected landscape that were not part of the Palatine Forest Nature Park (both placed under conservation orders in 1967) were incorporated.

== Sights ==
- Fritz Walter Stadium
- Betzenberg Wildlife Park
- Bremerhof, destination on the southern edge of the district
- Humberg Tower, an observation tower on the northern edge of the Palatine Forest Nature Park
