= Kaiserslautern Zoo =

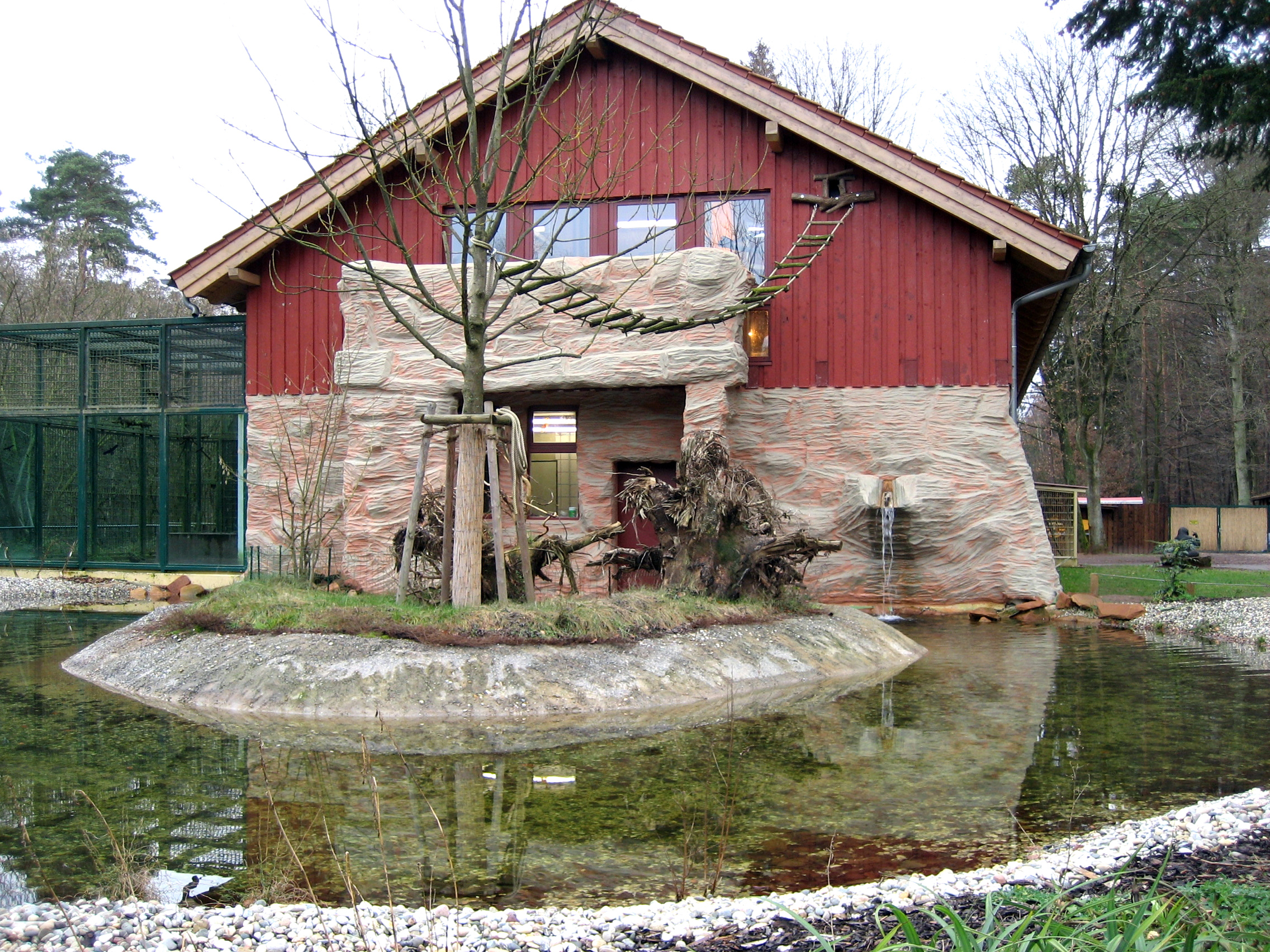
- The monkey house
- Interactive map of Kaiserslautern Zoo
- 49°27′58″N 7°40′50″E
- Date opening: 1968
- Location: Zum Tierpark 10, D-67661 Kaiserslautern, Germany
- Land area: 7 hectares (17.3 acres)
- No. of animals: 600
- No. of species: 103
- Memberships: EAZA, WAZA
- Website: www.zoo-kaiserslautern.com

The Kaiserslautern Zoo (German: Zoo Kaiserslautern, until 2003 Tierpark Siegelbach) is a zoo in the city of Kaiserslautern in Germany. The Zoo was founded on 15 June 1968 and is located in Kaiserslautern's Siegelbach neighbourhood. The zoo originally belonged to the town of Siegelbach which became part of the city in 1969.

The Zoo is home to about 600 animals of over 100 species and currently covers 7 hectares (17.3 acres) It is planned to be developed to 16 hectares (39.5 acres)

== History of the Zoo ==
In 2003, its ownership was transferred from the city to a private company. In 2005, the new monkey house was opened and a show with birds of prey established. In 2011, a farm with pet animals (Altgermanischen Frankenhof) was established, as well as a rehabilitation center for white storcks.

== See also ==
- List of zoos in Germany
