= Hohenecken Castle =

- Burg Hohenecken
- Hohenecken
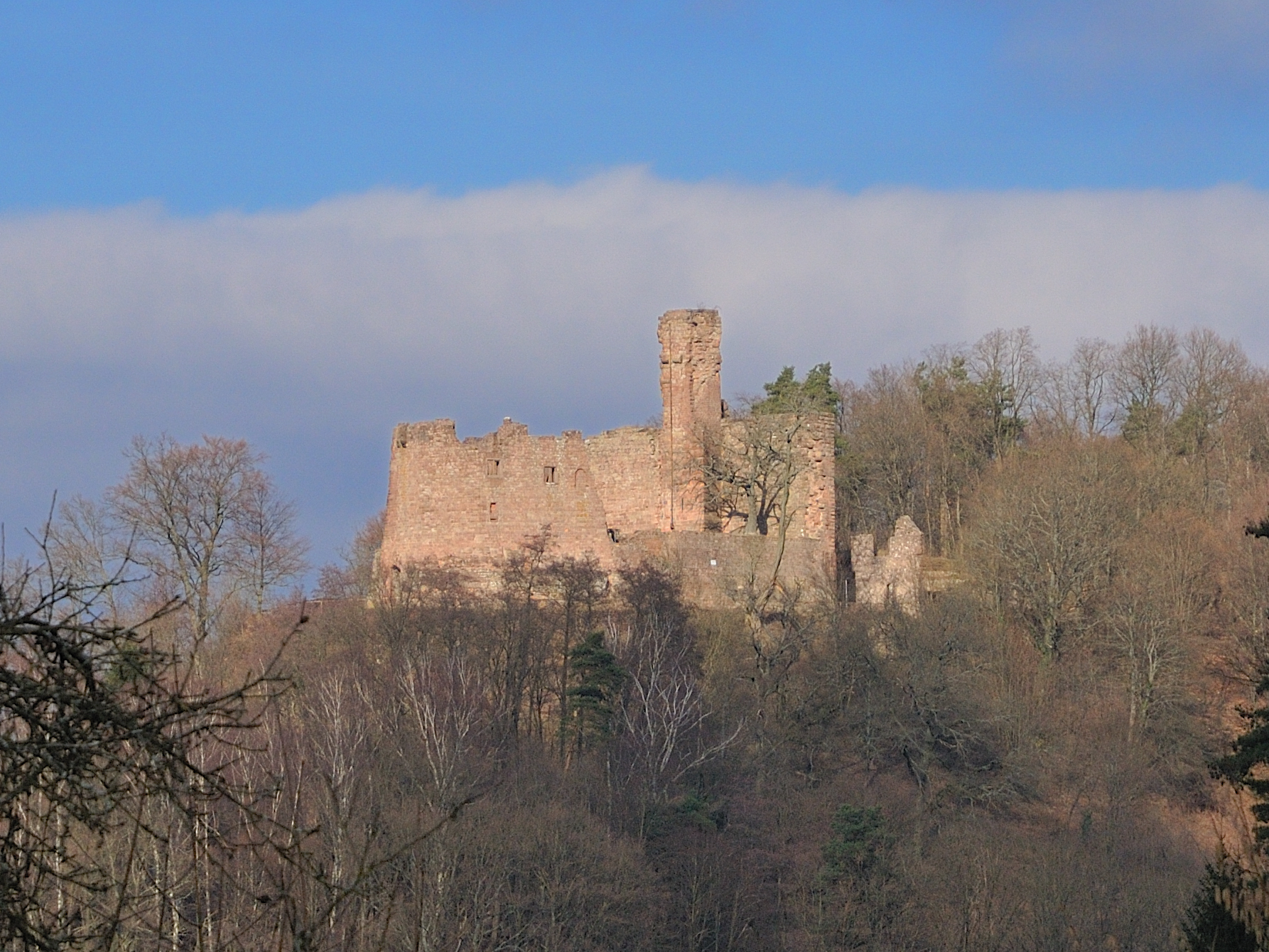
- Hohenecken Castle

Site information
- Type: hill castle, spur castle
- Code: DE-RP
- Condition: ruin

Location
- Coordinates: 49°24′53″N 7°42′05″E
- Height: 363 m above sea level (NN)

Site history
- Built: around 1200

Garrison information
- Occupants: ministeriales

Hohenecken Castle (German: Burg Hohenecken) (MHG: buorch hônecke) is the ruin of a spur castle from the Hohenstaufen era on the Schlossberg hill above the Kaiserslautern ward of Hohenecken in Rhineland-Palatinate, Germany. It is located at an elevation of 363 m above sea level (NN).

== History ==
The exact date of the foundation of the castle is unknown. Whilst older sources often plump for a construction date immediately following the building of the Barbarossaburg in Kaiserslautern in 1156, more recent sources tend to lean towards a date about 50 years later. The pentagonal bergfried and the massive shield wall in particular point to a construction date of around 1200.

In the first half of the 13th century the castle was enfeoffed to a Kaiserslautern family of ministeriales, the descendants of Reinhard of Lautern, the knight. In 1214, they were awarded the right of patronage of Ramstein by the king, Frederick II, who would later become emperor. From then on the castle's owners called themselves von Hohenecken. A barony belonged to the castle, which covered several villages: the valley settlement of Hohenecken at the foot of the castle hill (Burgberg) as well as Erfenbach, Espensteig, Siegelbach and Stockweiler, today Stockborn. All have since become part of the city of Kaiserslautern. Castle and barony were an imperial fief for centuries.

At the beginning of the early modern period, Hohenecken Castle went into decline. In the German Peasants' War of 1525 it was captured by rebellious peasants. In 1668 there was a lengthy siege by Prince-Elector Charles Louis of the Palatinate, which ended in the partial destruction of the castle. In 1689, during the War of the Palatine Succession, the castle was blown up by French troops.

== Layout ==
Including the outer ward, moat, upper and lower wards, the castle measures about 50 by 9 metres in area. It has a mighty shield wall (25 m wide, 11 m high) and a pentagonal bergfried. The castle is considered by experts to be one of the best examples of castles from the Hohenstaufen period. Today it is a popular attraction and offers extensive views.

== Literature ==
- Alexander Thon, ed. (2005), "Wie Schwalbennester an den Felsen geklebt. Burgen in der Nordpfalz", Beiträge zur Pfälzischen Geschichte (in German) (1 ed.), Regensburg, pp. 68–73, ISBN 3-927754-48-X, ISSN 0936-7640
- Jürgen Keddigkeit; Michael Losse (2002), "Hohenecken", in Jürgen Keddigkeit; Alexander Thon; Rolf Übel (eds.), Pfälzisches Burgenlexikon. Vol. 2. F–H (in German), vol. 12, Kaiserslautern, pp. 377–389, ISBN 3-927754-48-X, ISSN 0936-7640
