= Elmar Weindel =

German diplomat (born 1929)

German Ambassador to Mozambique of Germany to Mozambique
- In office July 21, 1976 – 1981
- Preceded by: Leopold Werz
- Succeeded by: Wilfried Nölle

German Ambassador to the United Arab Emirates of Germany to United Arab Emirates
- In office 1982–1984
- Succeeded by: Uwe Schramm

Personal details
- Born: 1929 (age 96–97) Kaiserslautern
- Education: he studied laws at the University of Würzburg, University of Erlangen.

Elmar Weindel (born 1929) is a retired German Ambassador.

In 1960, Weindel entered the Foreign Service. From 1963 to 1967, he was employed in Lisbon. From 1968 to 1975, he was employed in Tehran.

From July 21, 1976 to 1981 he was ambassador in Maputo. From 1982 to 1983, he was Ambassador to Abu Dhabi.

From 1984 to 1990, he was employed at the Facility management of the Federal Foreign Office. In mid August 1987 he led a delegation to the Rruga Skënderbeg to establish the West German embassy in Tirana.

From 1991 to 1994 he had Exequatur as Consul General in San Francisco. In 1994, Weindel retired.
