= Queitersberg =

Hill in the Palatine Forest, Germany

- also Quaidersberg, Quaitersberg, Queidersberg
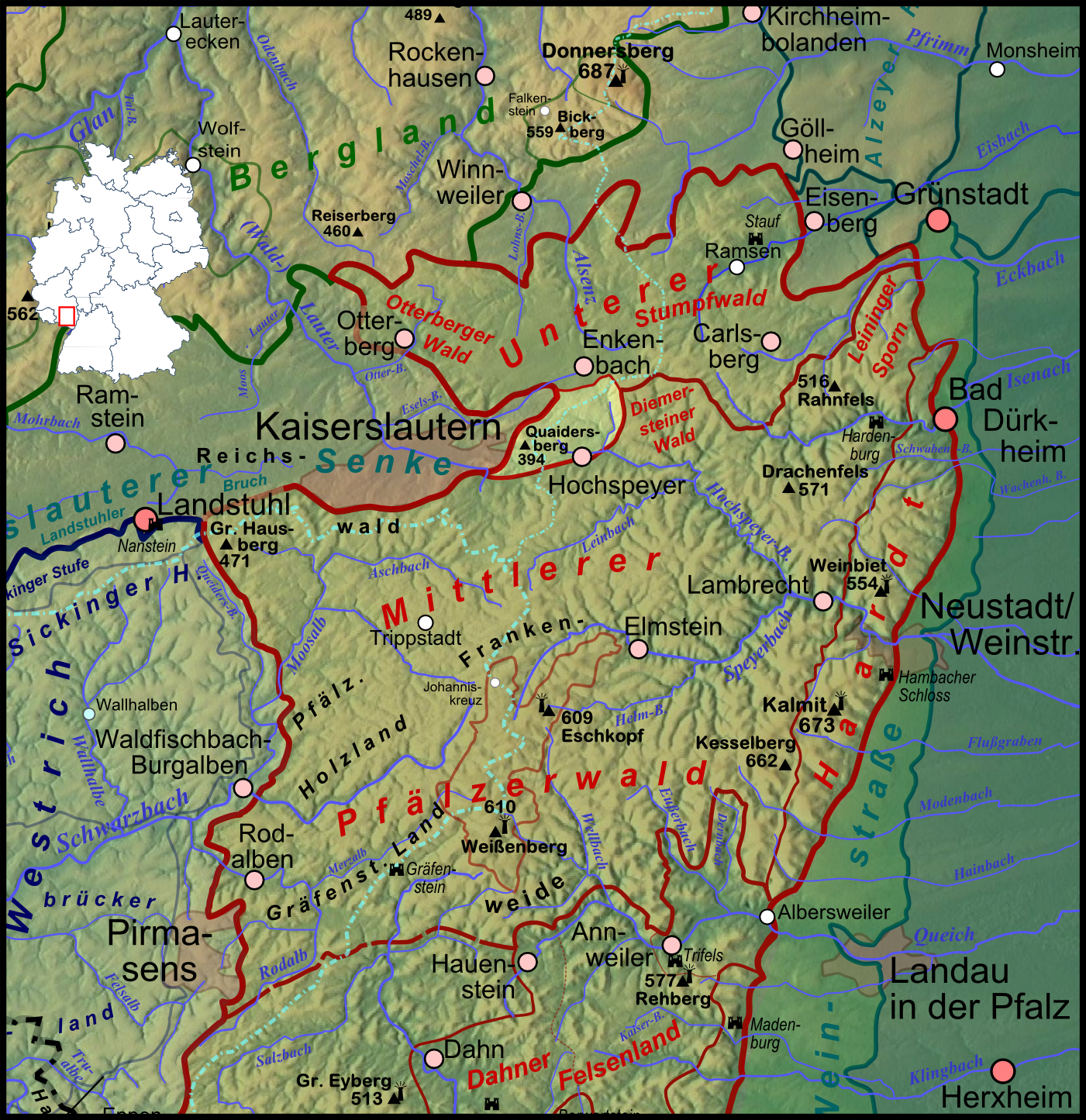
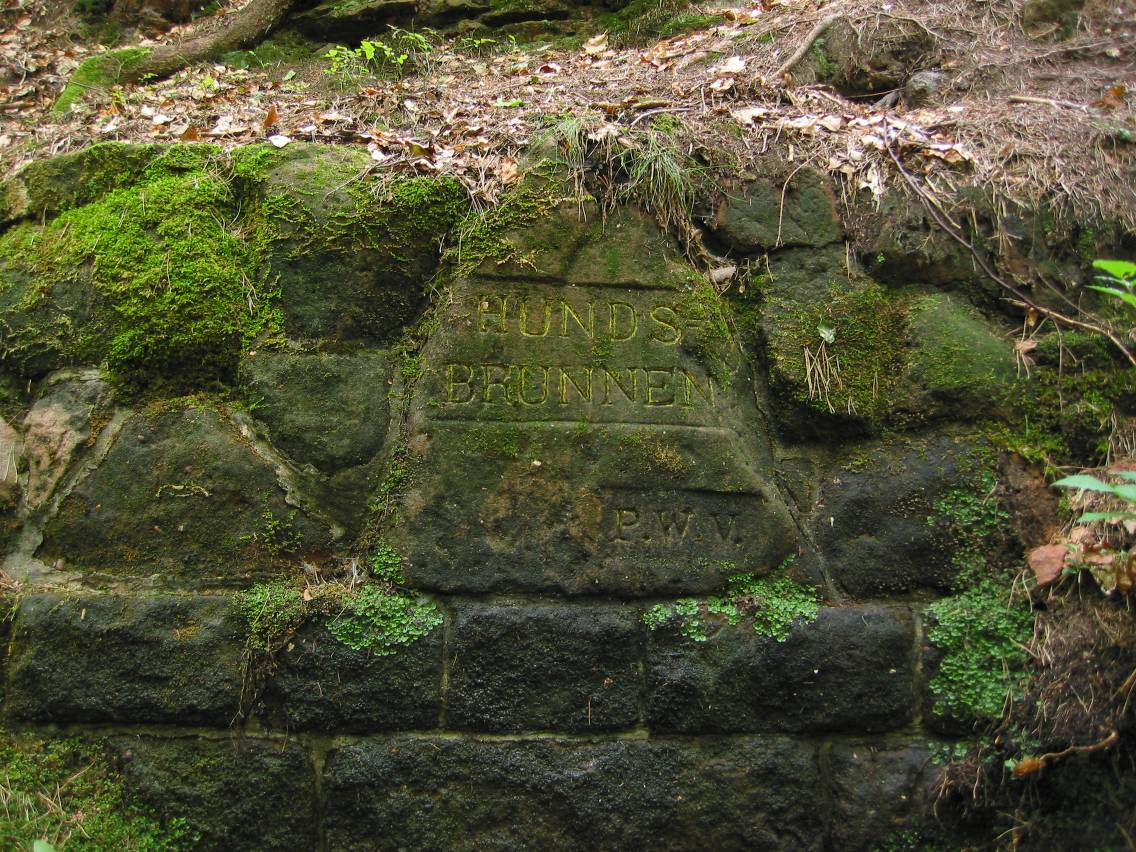
- Location of the hill in the Palatine Forest Ritterstein 166 at the Hundsbrunnen spring in the valley east of the Queitersberg

Highest point
- Elevation: 394 m above sea level (NN) (1,293 ft)
- Coordinates: 49°27′00″N 7°51′00″E

Geography
- Location within Rhineland-Palatinate
- Location: Rhineland-Palatinate (Germany)
- Watershed: Lauter/Hochspeyerbach watershed
- Parent range: Palatine Forest

Geology
- Rock type: Bunter Sandstone

The Queitersberg (German pronunciation: [ˈkvaɪtɐsbɛʁk]), more rarely spelled Quaidersberg, Quaitersberg or Queidersberg, is a 394-metre-high hill in the northern Palatine Forest in the German state of Rhineland-Palatinate. On a subpeak is the natural monument of the Felsplatt, a rock formation.

== Geography ==
=== Location ===
The Queitersberg lies in the municipal forest of Kaiserslautern between the city, whose built-up area ends 500 metres to the west, and the village of Hochspeyer two kilometres southeast. About a hundred metres north of the main summit there is a somewhat lower, plateau-like subpeak with a bunter sandstone rock outcrop. The sandstone formation is a natural monument with the name Felsplatt ("Rock Slab").

=== Streams ===
The Queitersberg seals the eastern side of the Kaiserslautern Basin; the watershed runs over it from southwest to northeast, separating the source region of the Lauter from that of the Hochspeyerbach. The Lauter, which is also called the Waldlauter, flows via the Glan to the Nahe and is part of that river's catchment area. The water of the Hochspeyerbach flows via the Speyerbach to the Upper Rhine.

=== Surrounding area ===
Queitersberg is 500 metres from the Queitersberg to the A 6 motorway to the north (Saarbrücken–Mannheim). Between two of its junctions - 16b Kaiserslautern-Ost and 17 Enkenbach-Alsenborn - there is a car park on the southern side in the direction of Mannheim, called Quaidersberg. 1500 metres from the summit to the south is the B 37 federal highway (Kaiserslautern–Bad Dürkheim). In a bowl between the Queitersberg and Hochspeyer lies the spring of Hundsbrunnen.
