= Fritz-Walter-Stadion =

Football stadium in Kaiserslautern, Germany

- Betze
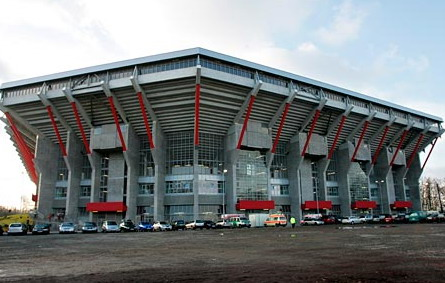
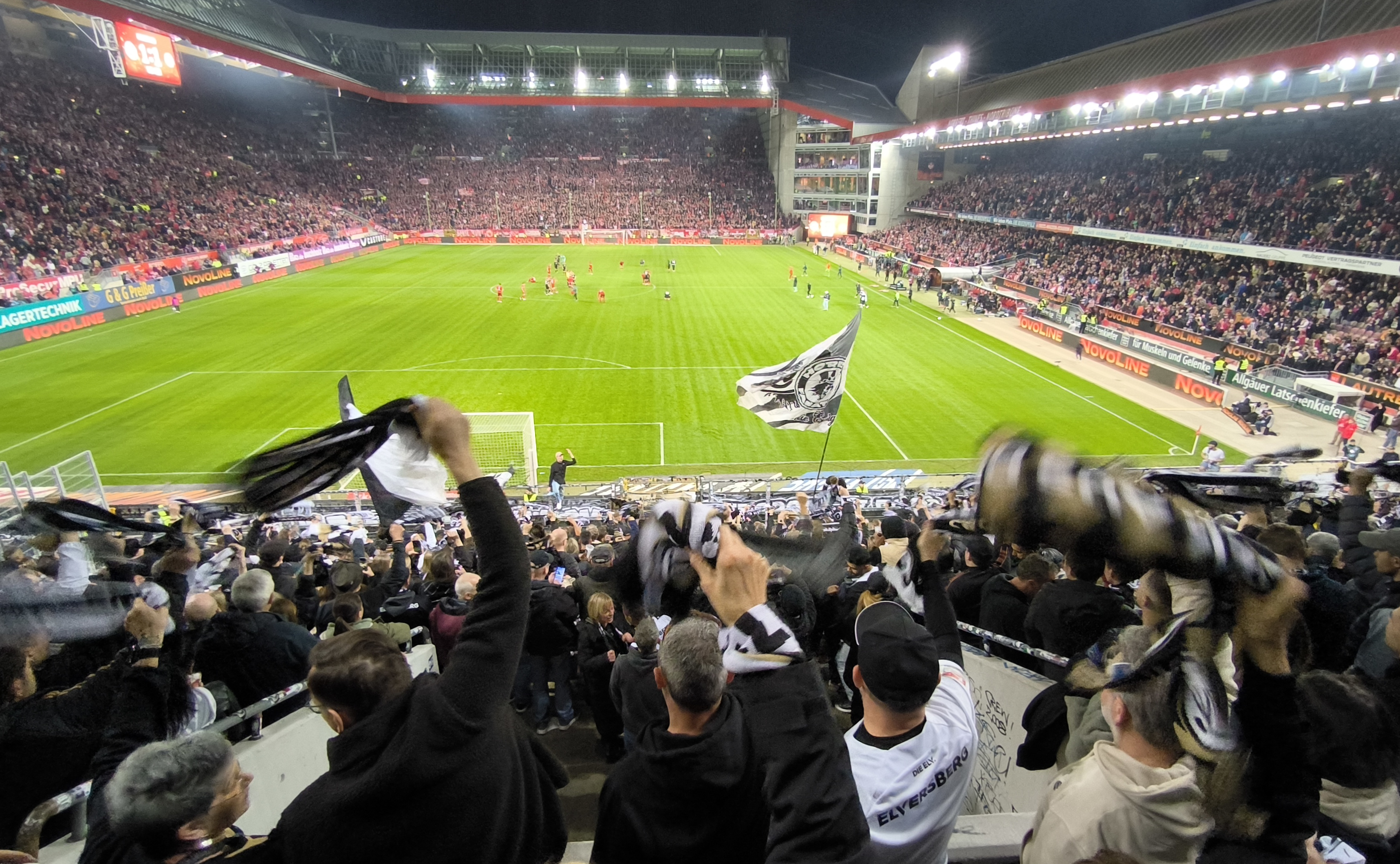
- Interactive map of Fritz-Walter-Stadion
- Former names: Betzenbergstadion (1920–1985)
- Location: Kaiserslautern, Rhineland-Palatinate, Germany
- Coordinates: 49°26′4″N 7°46′34″E
- Owner: Fritz-Walter-Stadion Kaiserslautern GmbH
- Capacity: 49,327 (league matches); 47,103 (international matches)
- Surface: grass
- Record attendance: 50,754 (1. FC Kaiserslautern 1–1 Bayern Munich, 6 May 2006)
- Field size: 105 x 68 m
- Public transit: Kaiserslautern Hauptbahnhof (Central Station)

Construction
- Built: 1920
- Opened: 13 May 1920 (FV 1900 Kaiserslautern 0–2 FC Pfalz Ludwigshafen)
- Renovated: 1932, 1945–1946, 1948, 1953, 1963, 1966, 1972–1973, 1978, 1986, 1993–1994, 1998, 2002–2005
- Architect: Folker Fiebiger

Tenants
- 1. FC Kaiserslautern; Germany national football team (selected matches)

Website
- Fritz-Walter-Stadion

Fritz-Walter-Stadion (German pronunciation: [fʁɪtsˈvaltɐˌʃtaːdi̯ɔn]) is the home stadium of 1. FC Kaiserslautern and is located in the city of Kaiserslautern, Rhineland-Palatinate, Germany. It was one of the stadia used in the 2006 FIFA World Cup. It is named after Fritz Walter (1920–2002), who played for the Kaiserslautern club throughout his career and was captain of the Germany national football team that won the 1954 FIFA World Cup in the "Miracle of Bern". The stadium was built on the Betzenberg hill, hence its nickname "Betze" (German pronunciation: [ˈbɛt͡sə]), and was opened in 1920.

== Renovation ==
In preparation for the 2006 FIFA World Cup, the stadium underwent a €76,5 million renovation beginning in 2002 that added a media center and a new floodlight system. The capacity was also increased from 38,500, of which 18,600 were standing, to 49,850, of which 16,363 are standing. Since 1 April 2023, the official capacity has been 49,327.

== 2006 FIFA World Cup ==
The stadium was one of the venues for the 2006 FIFA World Cup.

The following games were played at the stadium:

Date	Time (CET)	Team #1	Res.	Team #2	Round	Spectators
12 June 2006	15:00	Australia	3–1	Japan	Group F	46,000
17 June 2006	21:00	Italy	1–1	United States	Group E	46,000
20 June 2006	21:00	Paraguay	2–0	Trinidad and Tobago	Group B	46,000
23 June 2006	16:00	Saudi Arabia	0–1	Spain	Group H	46,000
26 June 2006	17:00	Italy	1–0	Australia	Round of 16	46,000

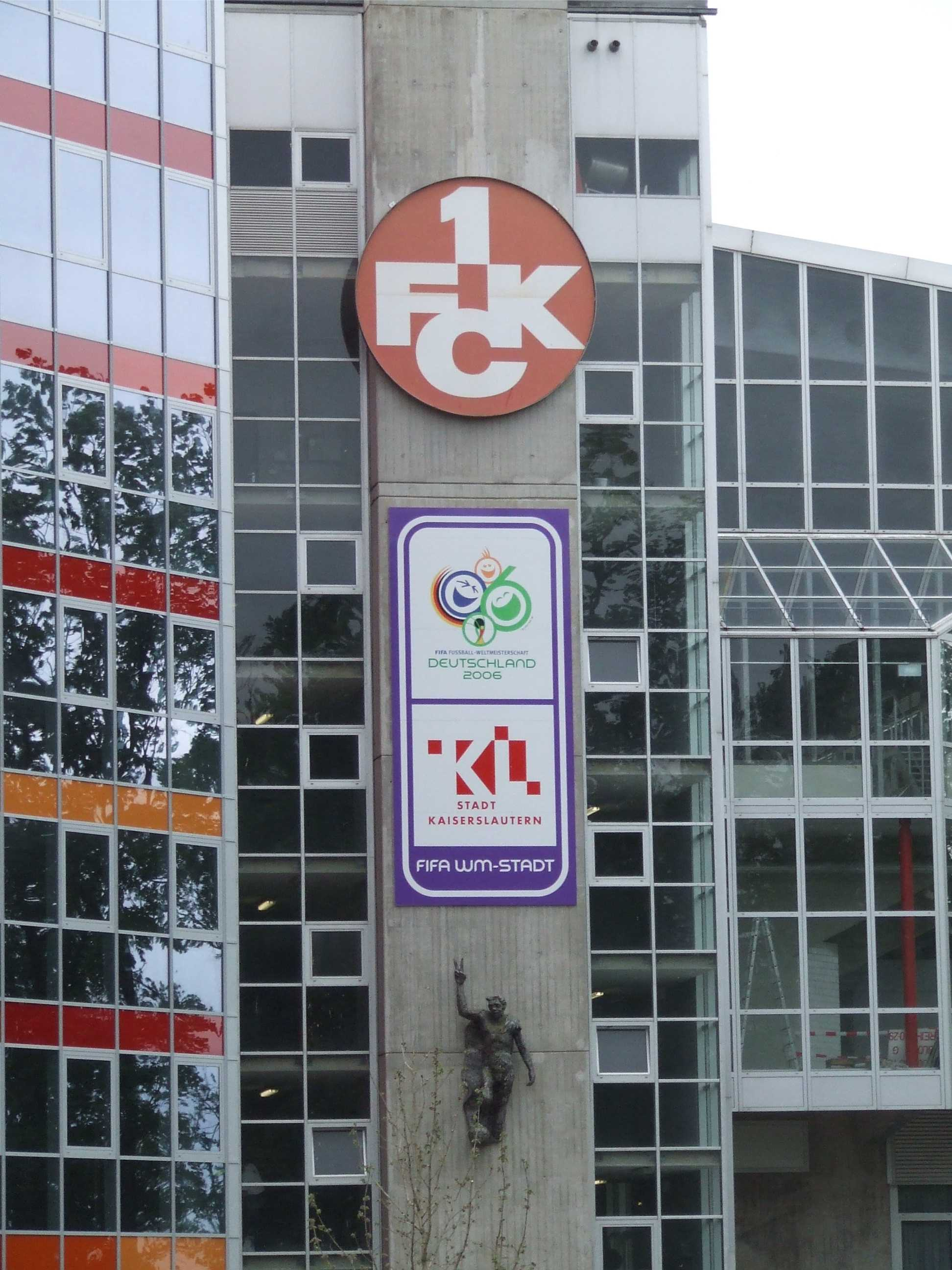
The 1. FCK logo, the logo of the 2006 FIFA World Cup, and the Betzenberg Devil on the side of the north stand

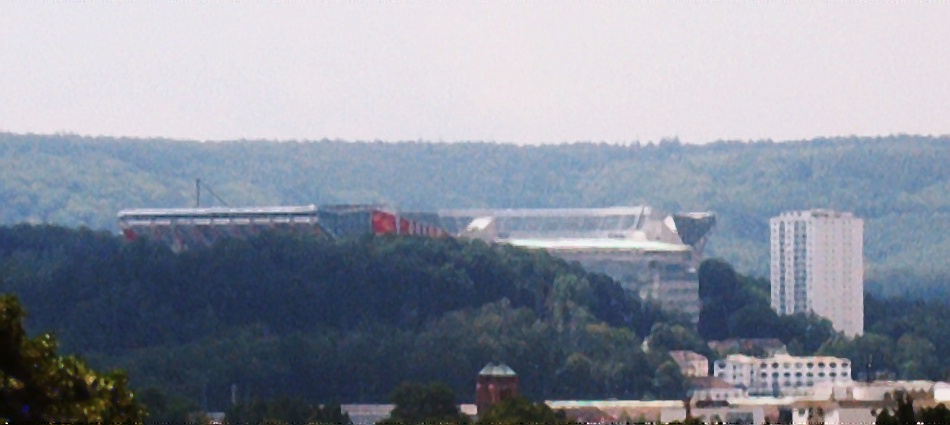
View of the stadium from the north-east

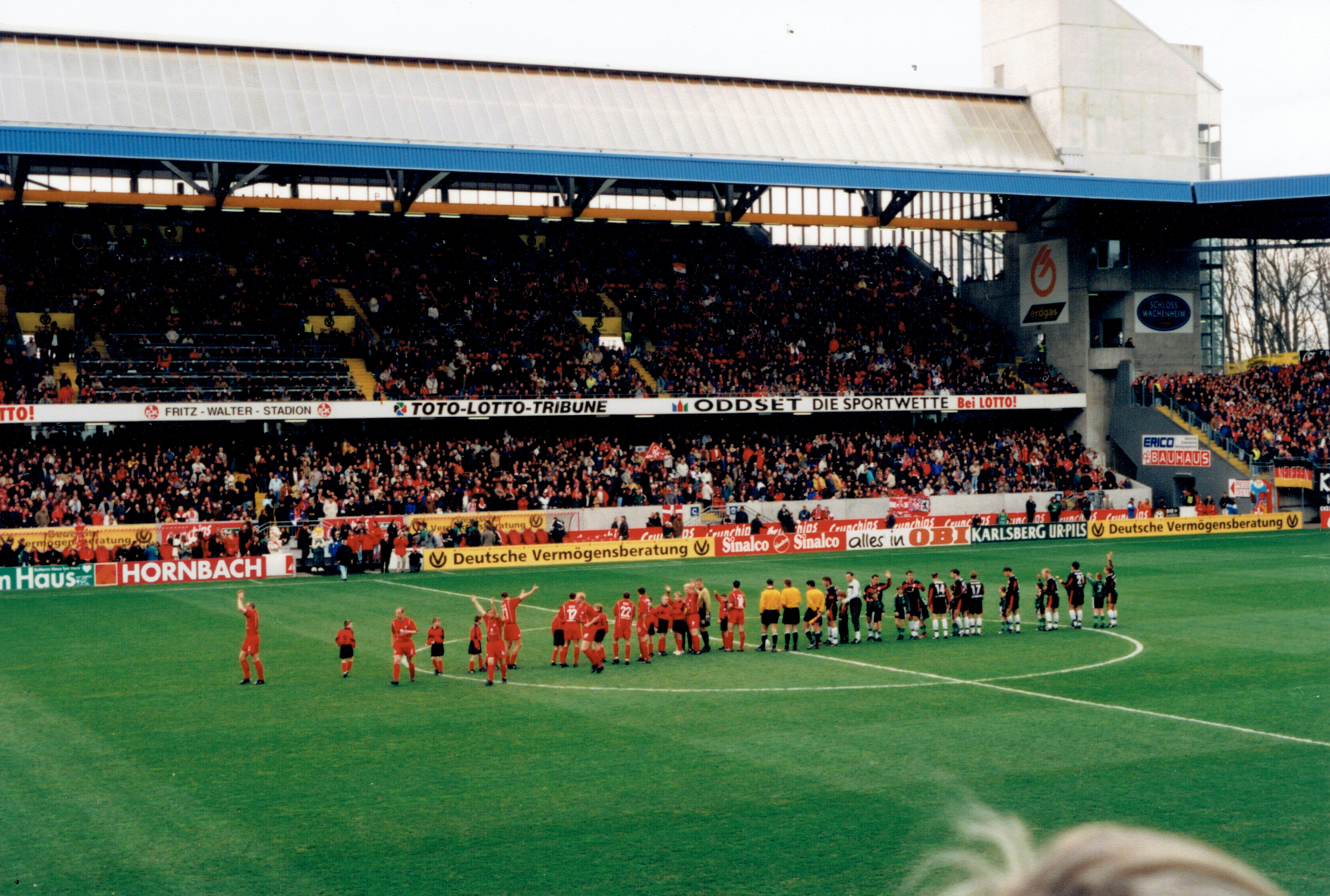
The Fritz-Walter-Stadion in the year 2000

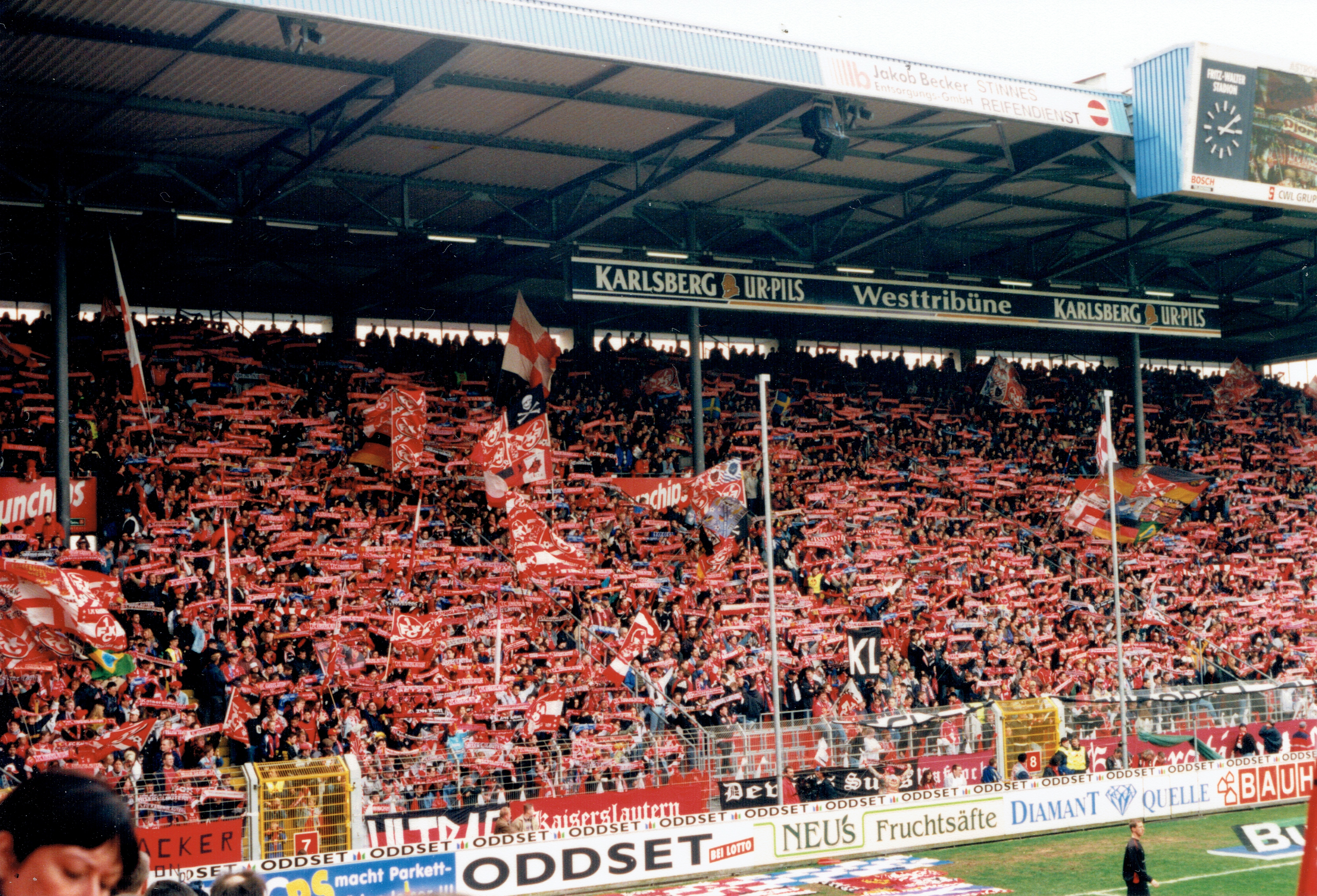
The west stand, home of the most fervent FCK supporters, in 2000.

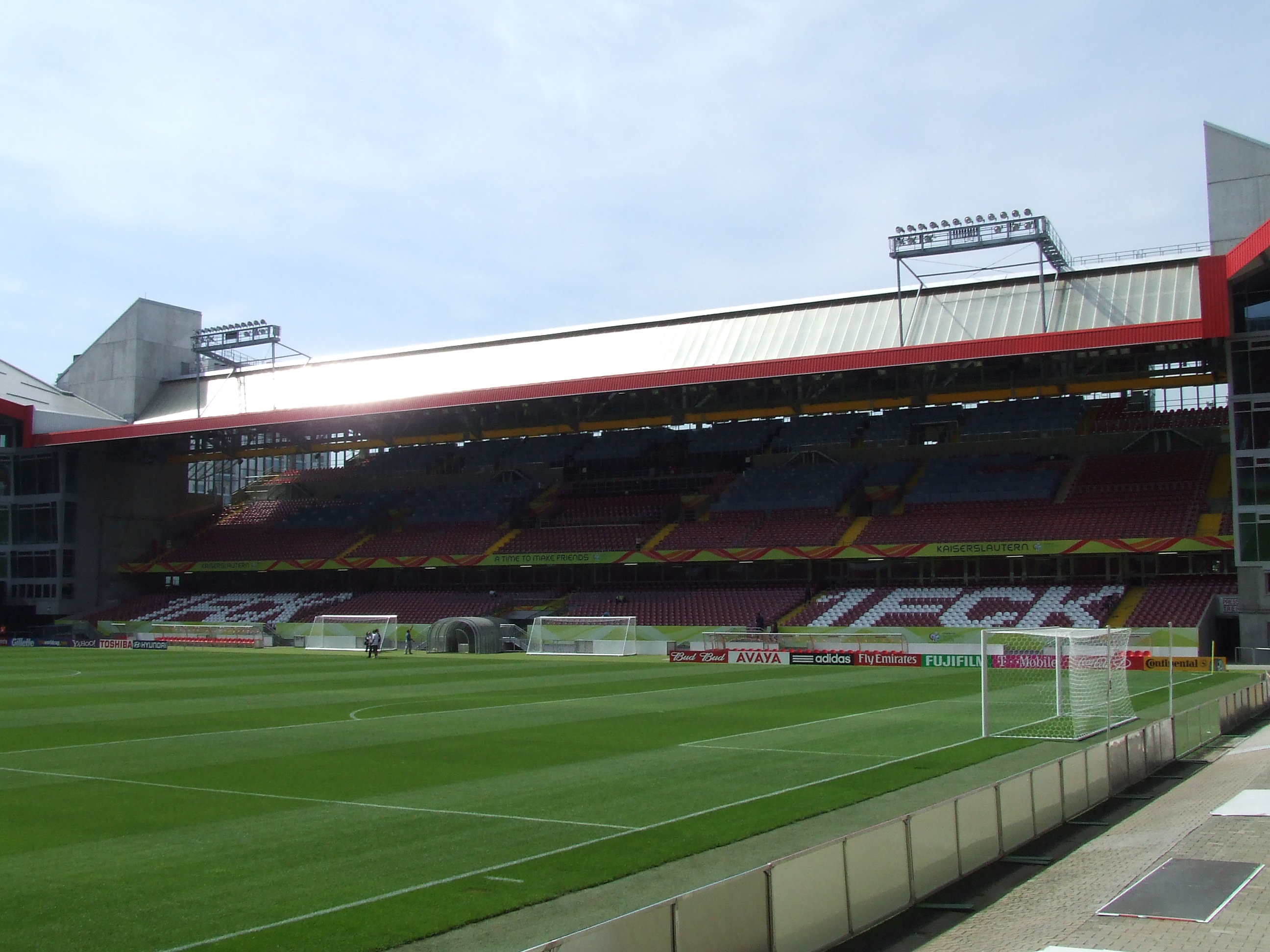
The north stand (main stand)

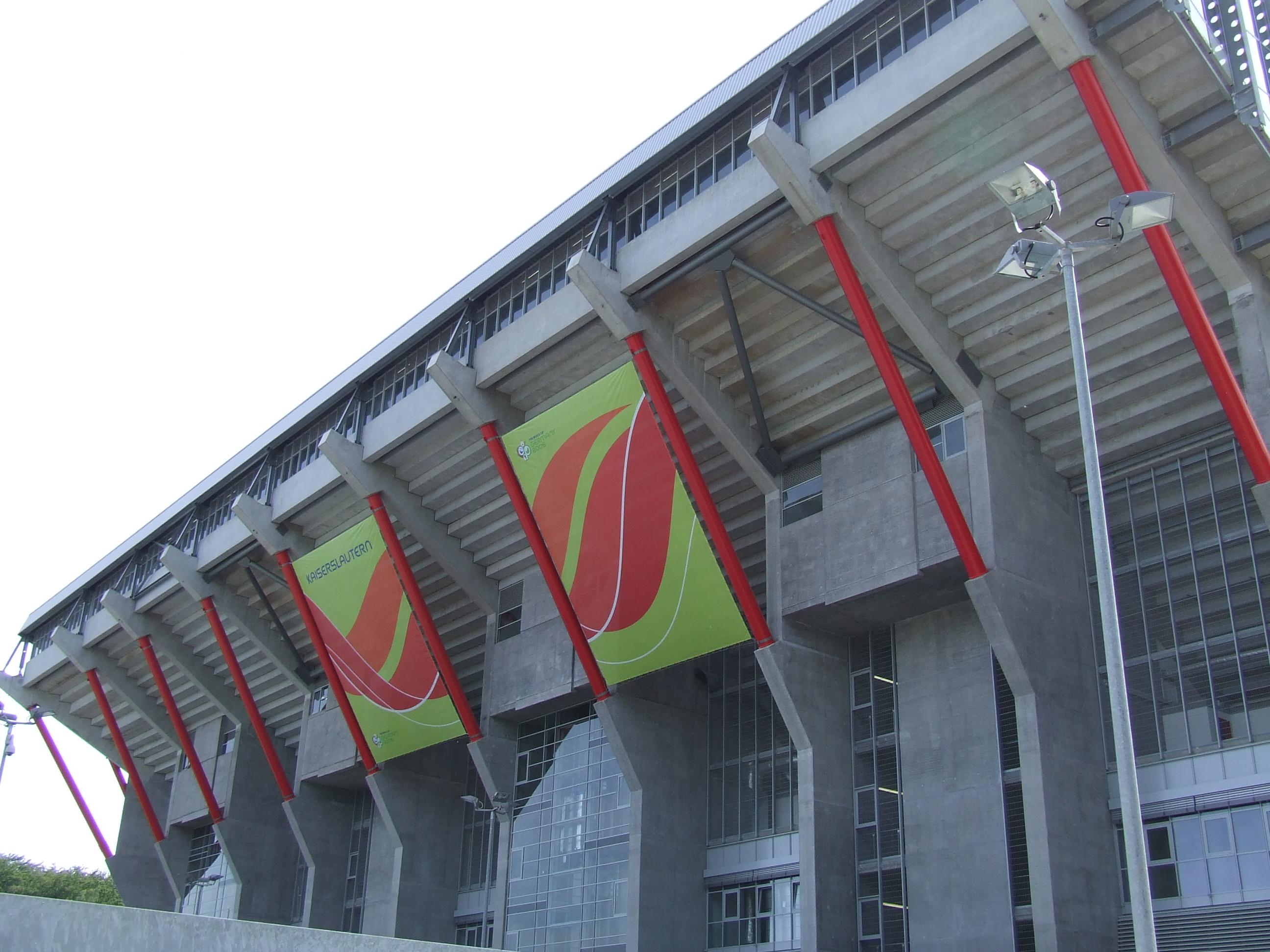
The east stand from the outside

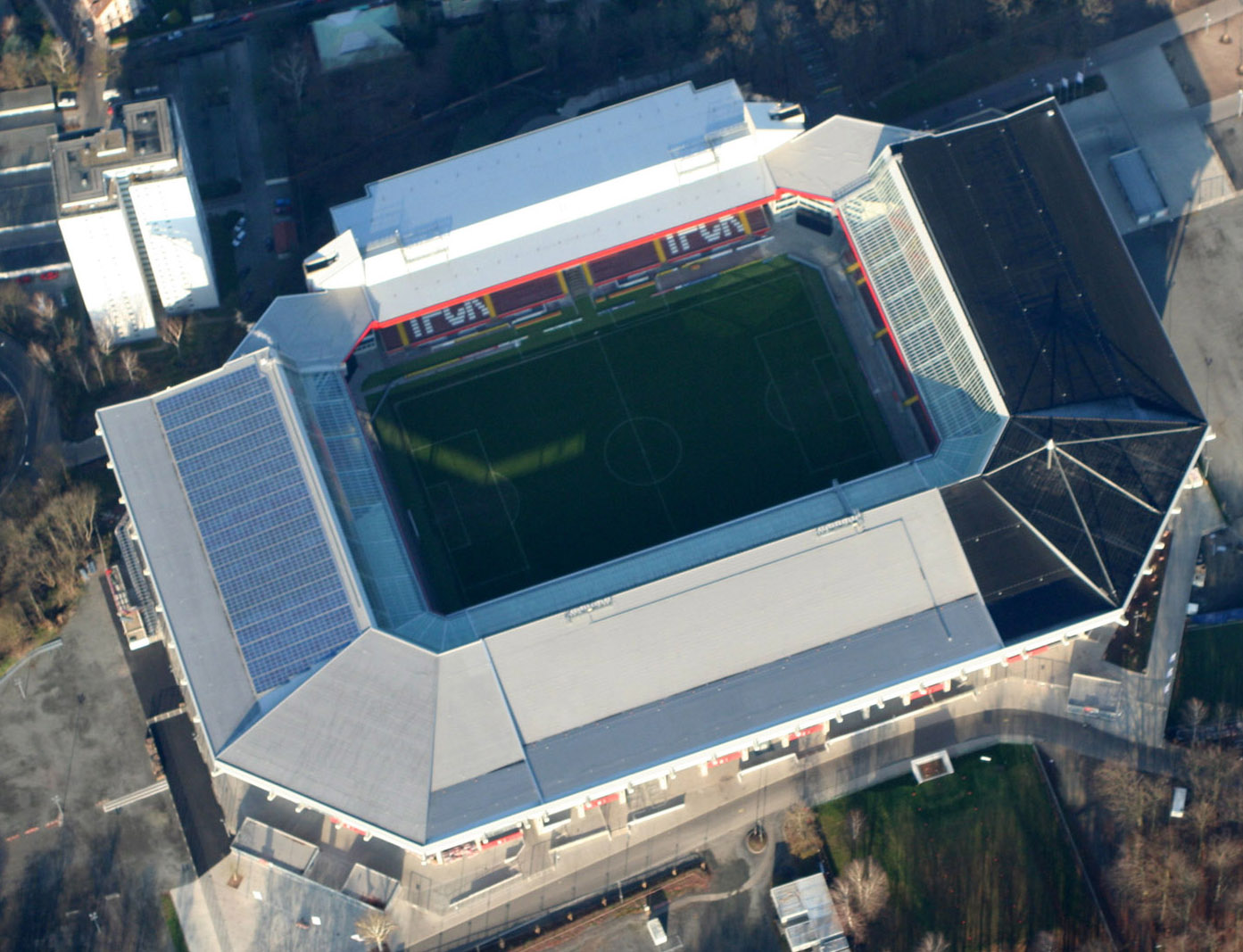
Aerial view of the stadium

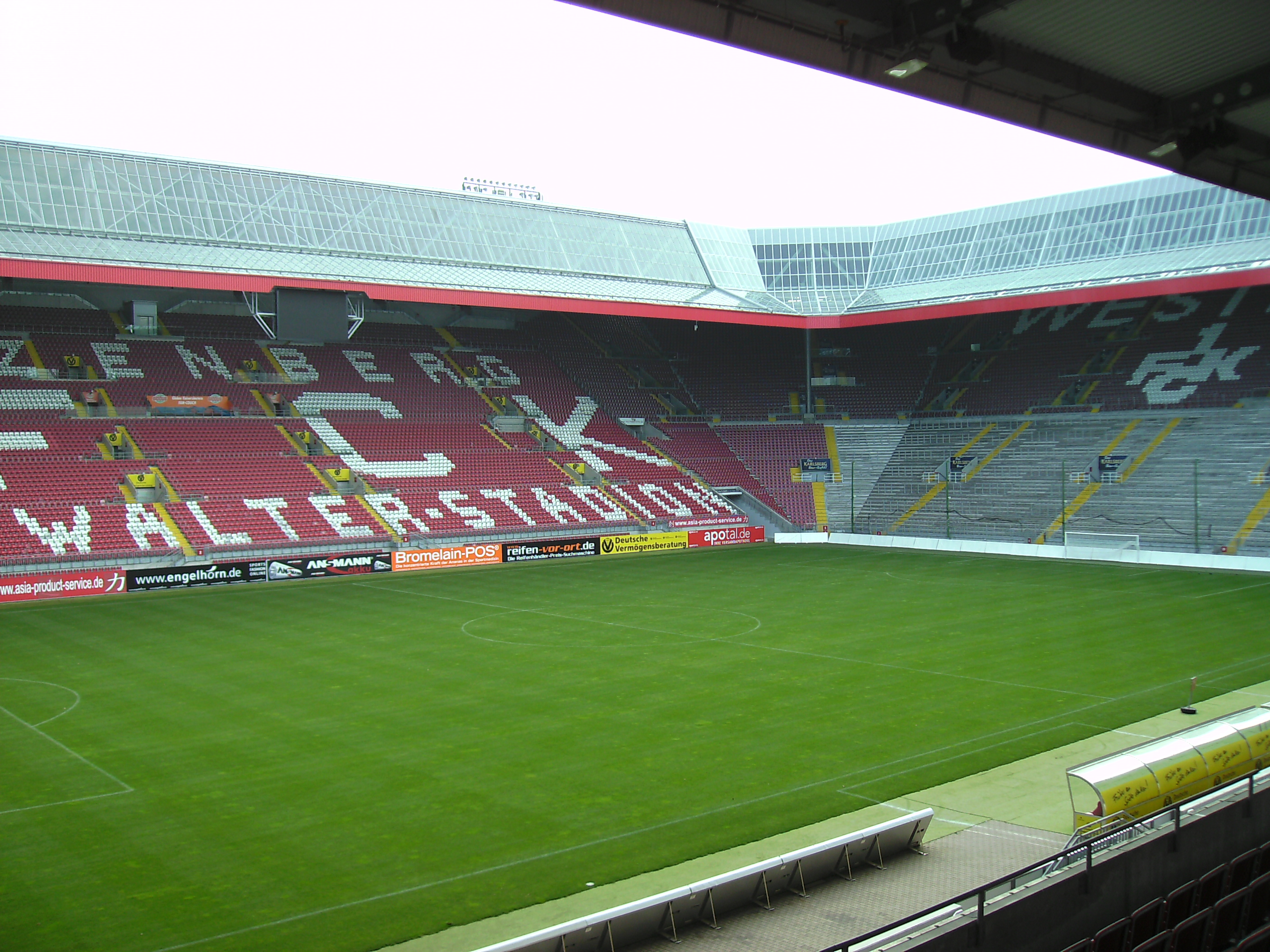
View towards the south-west corner

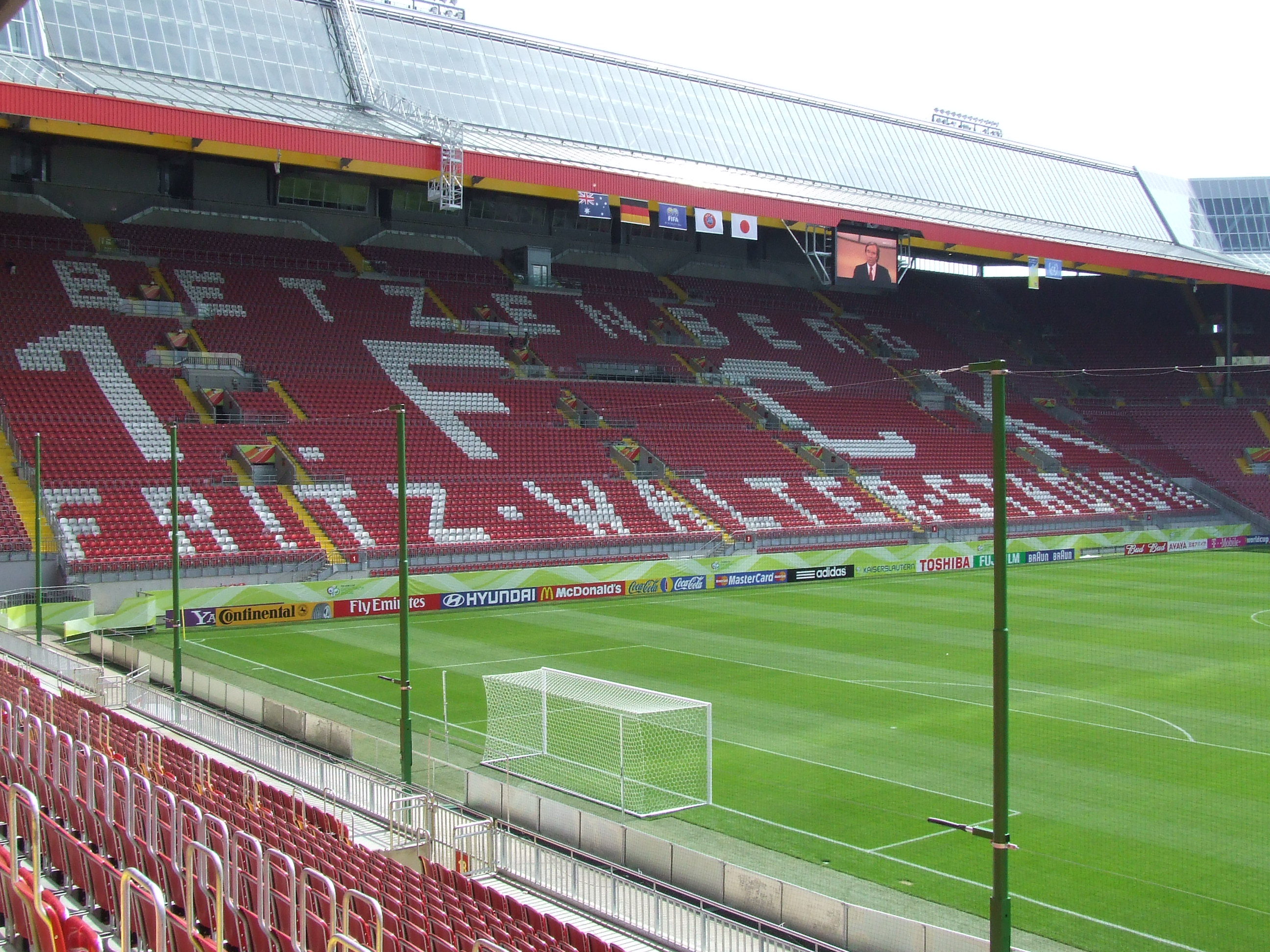
Fritz-Walter-Stadion when empty

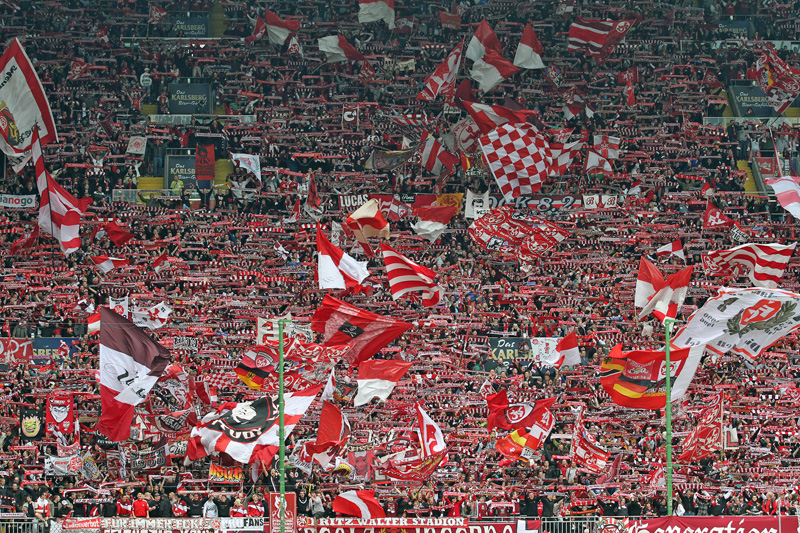
1. FC Kaiserslautern fans at the Fritz-Walter-Stadion in April 2011

== See also ==
- List of football stadiums in Germany
- Lists of stadiums

Preceded by Stadio Dino Manuzzi; Cesena	UEFA Women's Euro; Final Venue; 1995	Succeeded by Ullevaal Stadion; Oslo
