= Kaiserslautern Town Hall =

City hall in Kaiserslautern, Germany

- Rathaus Kaiserslautern
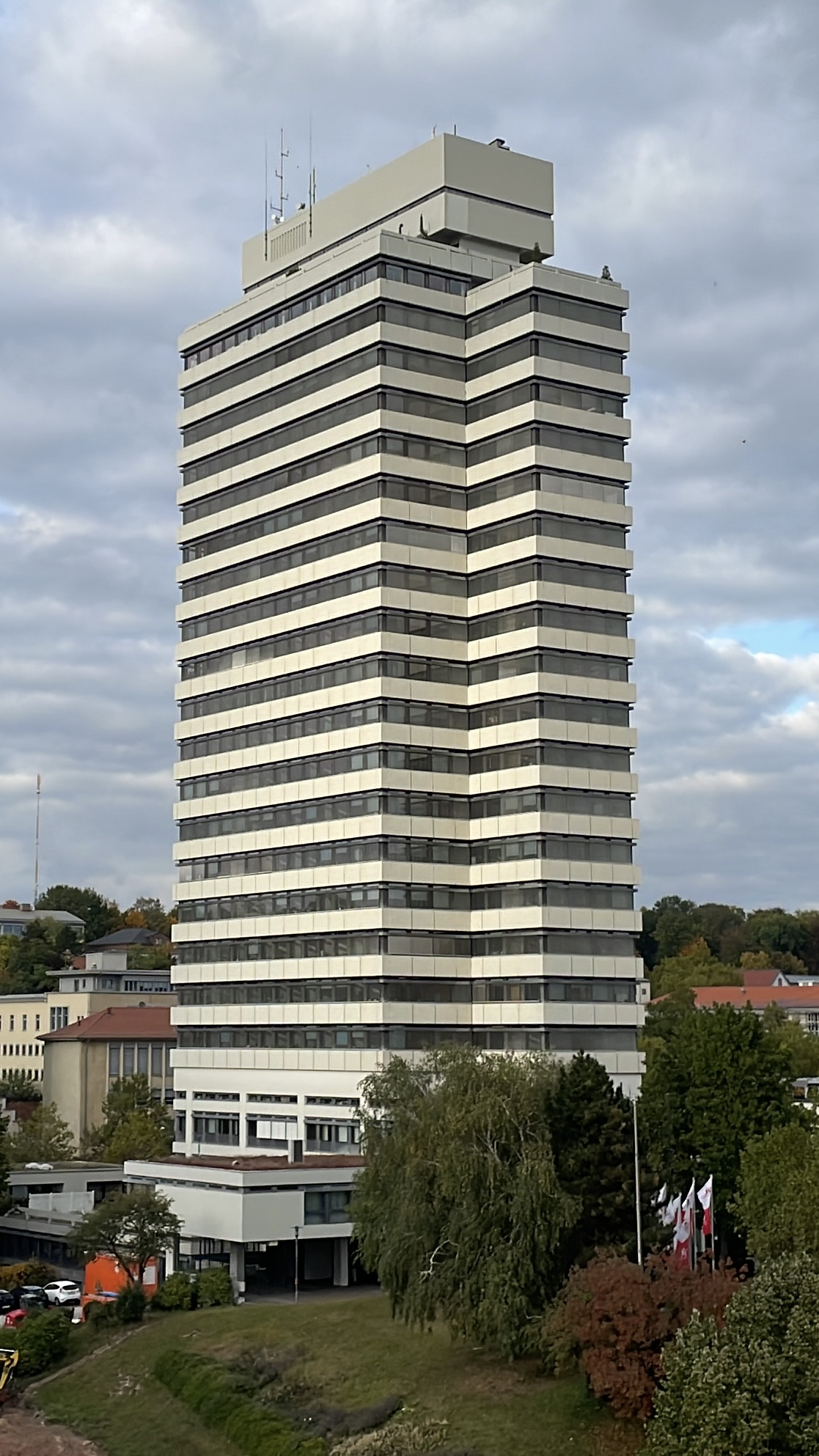
- The main frontage of the town hall in October 2021

General information
- Type: City hall
- Architectural style: International style
- Location: Kaiserslautern, Germany
- Coordinates: 49.4467°N 7.7678°E
- Construction started: 1964
- Completed: 1968

Height
- Height: 84 metres (276 ft)

Design and construction
- Architect: Roland Ostertag

The Kaiserslautern Town Hall (German: Rathaus Kaiserslautern) is a municipal building in Kaiserslautern, in western Germany, standing on Willy-Brandt-Platz. It accommodates the offices of the mayor of Kaiserslautern and the meeting place of the city council.

== History ==
The first town hall

The first town hall was established in St.-Martins-Platz in the mid-18th century. It was designed in the neoclassical style and built in brick with a cement render finish. The design involved a symmetrical main frontage of nine bays facing onto the square. The central bay featured a segmental-headed doorway with a keystone flanked by Doric order columns supporting an entablature and a coat of arms supported by scrolls. The building was fenestrated by casement windows on three floors and by dormer windows at attic level. After it was no longer required for municipal use, the building served as the Emmerich Smola Music School.

In the 1950s, following significant population growth, the council decided to commission a more substantial town hall. The site they selected had been occupied by the ruined imperial palace of Kaiserslautern, also known colloquially as Barbarossaburg or Burg Kaiserslautern: it was a fortified castle built by Emperor Frederick Barbarossa as a royal palace in the Western Palatinate city of Kaiserslautern in the 12th century. The site went on to become the venue for the prestigious castle of John Casimir of the Palatinate-Simmern in the 16th century. The castle was destroyed during the War of the Spanish Succession.

The design by the architect Roland Ostertag from Leonberg emerged as the winner in an architectural competition for a town hall on Paradeplatz in Mannheim, in 1960, but only the foundations were completed due to financial difficulties. With small changes, this design was then adopted in Kaiserslautern. The foundation stone for the new building was laid on 3 July 1964. It was designed in the International style, built in concrete and glass and was officially opened on 29 November 1968.

== Description ==
The building consists of a tower with 25 stories above ground, of which the three uppermost ones are only used for storage or for plant and equipment. The design involves a symmetrical main frontage of 14 bays facing onto Maxstraße. However, the rear of the building is projected sidewards on both sides meaning that the rear elevation extends to 22 bays. The tower, which is clad in alternating rows on glass and white cladding, is 84 metres (276 ft) high. On the 21st floor, there is a restaurant with panoramic views as far as the Palatinate Forest.
