= Kaiserslautern =

City in Rhineland-Palatinate, Germany

Kaiserslautern Lautre (Palatine German)
- Town
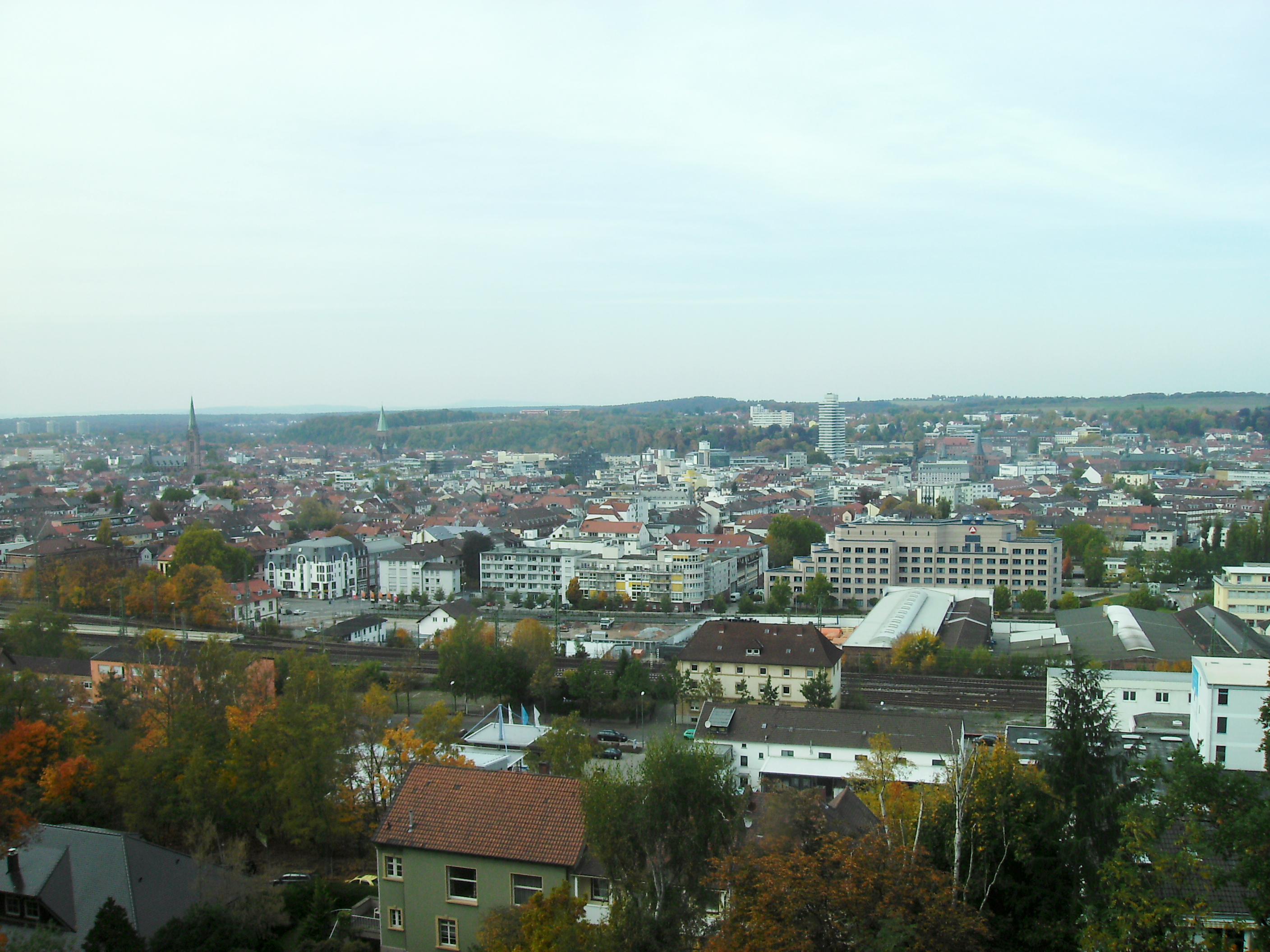
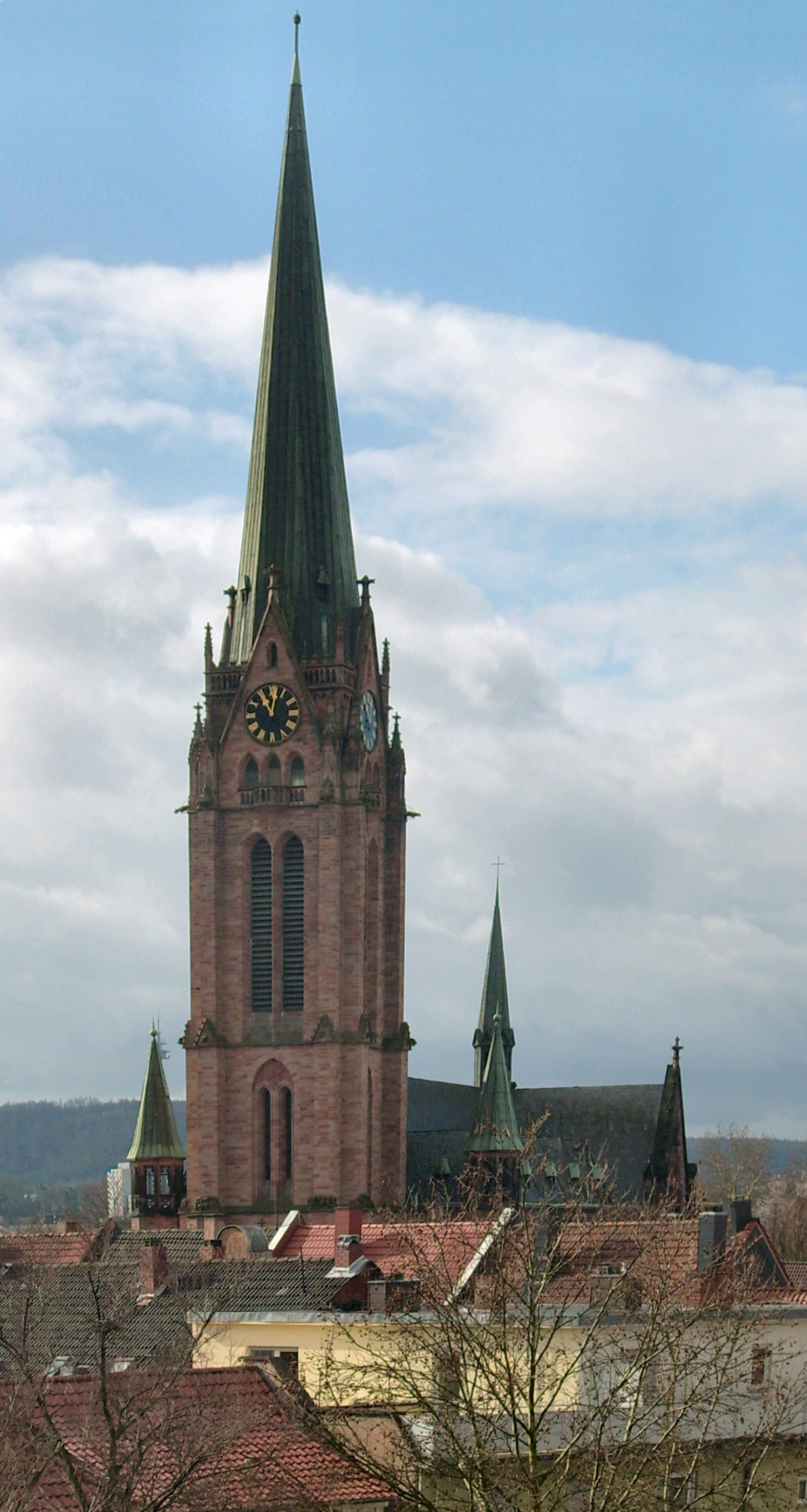
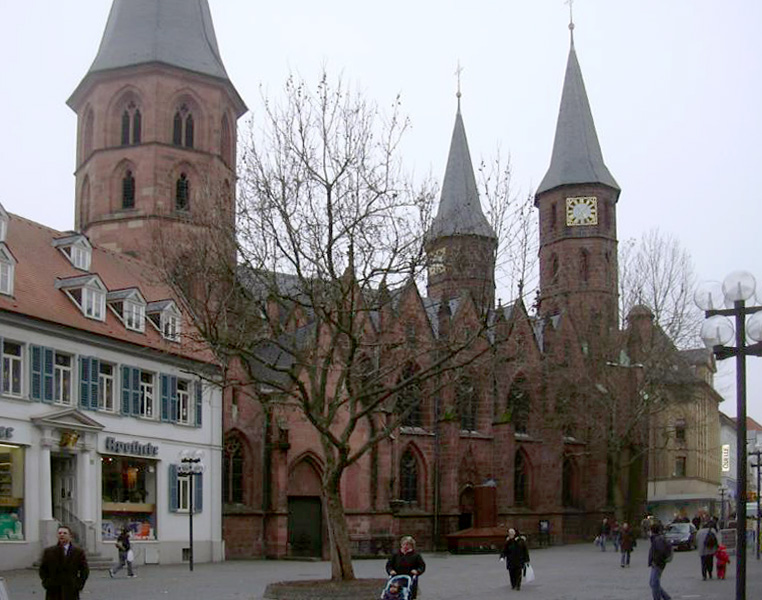
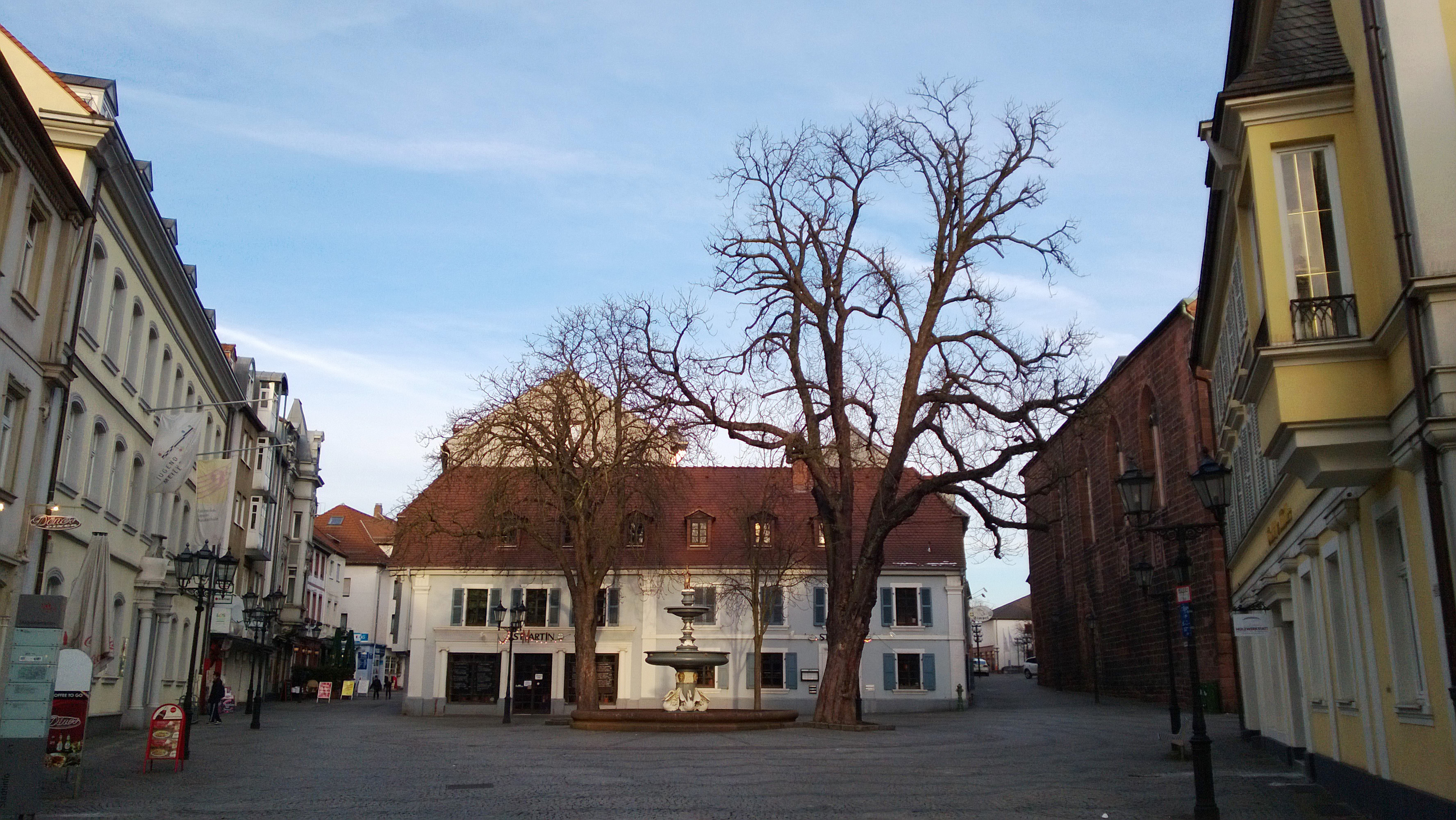
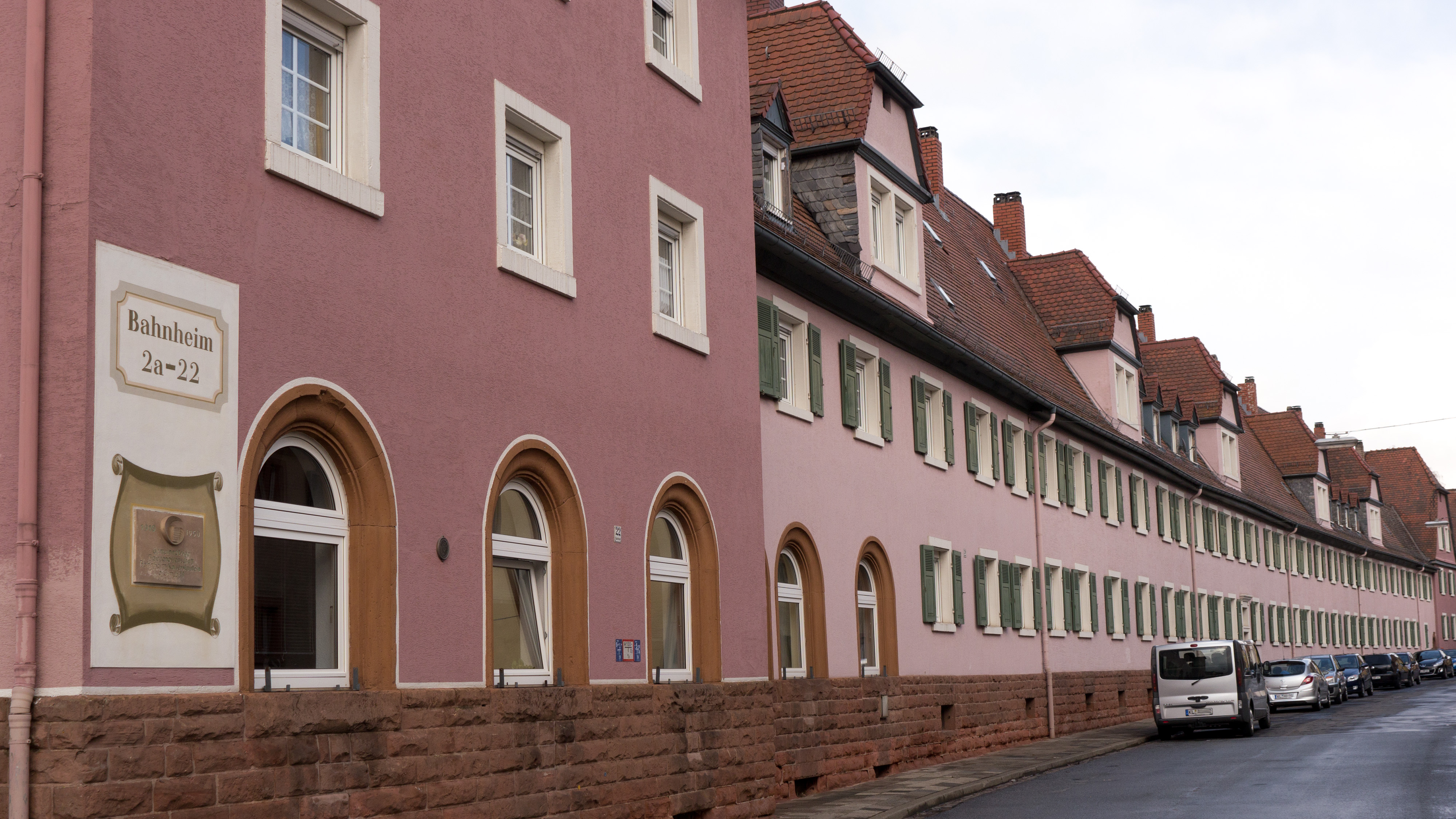
- View over Kaiserslautern Marienkirche Stiftskirche St.-Martins square Garden city Bahnheim

- Flag Coat of arms

- Location of Kaiserslautern in Rhineland-Palatinate
- Interactive map of Kaiserslautern
- Location within Germany Location within Rhineland-Palatinate
- Coordinates: 49°26′41″N 7°46′8″E
- Country: Germany
- State: Rhineland-Palatinate
- District: Urban district

Government
  - Mayor (2023–31): Beate Kimmel (SPD)

Area
  - Total: 139.74 km^{2} (53.95 sq mi)
- Elevation: 251 m (823 ft)

Population (2025-12-31)
  - Total: 100,247
  - Density: 717.38/km^{2} (1,858.0/sq mi)
- Time zone: UTC+01:00 (CET)
  - Summer (DST): UTC+02:00 (CEST)
- Postal codes: 67655–67663
- Dialling codes: 0631, 06301
- Vehicle registration: KL
- Website: kaiserslautern.de

Kaiserslautern (German pronunciation: [ˌkaɪzɐsˈlaʊtɐn]; Palatine German: Lautre) is a city in southwest Germany, located in the state of Rhineland-Palatinate at the edge of the Palatinate Forest. The historic centre dates to the 9th century. It is 459 kilometres (285 miles) from Paris, 117 km (73 miles) from Frankfurt am Main, 666 km (414 miles) from Berlin, and 159 km (99 miles) from Luxembourg.

Kaiserslautern is home to about 100,000 people. Additionally, approximately 45,000 NATO military personnel are based in the city and its surrounding district (Landkreis Kaiserslautern).

== History and demographics ==
Historical population
Year	Pop.	±%
1611	2,120	—
1683	940	−55.7%
1810	3,654	+288.7%
1830	7,292	+99.6%
1871	17,896	+145.4%
1900	48,310	+169.9%
1910	54,659	+13.1%
1919	55,707	+1.9%
1933	62,619	+12.4%
1950	62,761	+0.2%
1961	86,259	+37.4%
1970	99,617	+15.5%
1987	97,326	−2.3%
2011	96,340	−1.0%
2018	99,845	+3.6%
Population size may be affected by changes in administrative divisions. source:

Prehistoric settlement in the area of what is now Kaiserslautern has been traced to at least 800 BC. Some 2,500-year-old Celtic tombs were uncovered at Miesau, a town about 29 kilometres (18 miles) west of Kaiserslautern. The recovered relics are now in the Museum for Palatinate History at Speyer.

=== Medieval period ===
Kaiserslautern received its name from the favourite hunting retreat of Holy Roman Emperor Frederick Barbarossa who ruled the Holy Roman Empire from 1155 until 1190. The small river Lauter made the old section of Kaiserslautern an island in medieval times. Ruins of Frederick's original castle, built 1152–1160, can still be seen in front of the Rathaus (city hall). A second castle, Nanstein Castle, was built at Landstuhl to guard the western approach to the city. Barbarossa's influence on Kaiserslautern remains today, in its nickname as a "Barbarossa city". Local legends claim in 1497, a nearly 6 m long pike was caught in a lake, the Kaiserwoog, with a ring saying it was placed by Emperor Frederick II, personally in 1230, later finding its way onto the city's coat of arms.

The Stiftkirche, Kaiserslautern's oldest church, was constructed between 1250 and 1350. As the population of Kaiserslautern grew, King Rudolf von Habsburg chartered the town as an imperial city in 1276. St. Martin's Church was built in the 14th century, originally as a Franciscan monastery church. Today a section of the original city wall still stands in the courtyard of the church.

By 1375, the city of Kaiserslautern was pledged to Electoral Palatinate and therefore became subsequently part of the Wittelsbach inheritance.

=== Reformation ===
In 1519, Franz von Sickingen became the owner of Nanstein Castle. He became a Protestant, and in 1522, Nanstein was a stronghold for local nobles favouring the Reformation. Sickingen and the local nobles began their battle against the Archbishop of Trier, but the attack was unsuccessful, and they retreated to Nanstein. Nanstein was then besieged by cannon-armed German Catholic princes. Sickingen died after the castle surrendered, and the Protestant nobility of the Electoral Palatinate were subdued by the Catholic princes.

Count of the Electoral Palatinate Johann Casimir, came to Kaiserslautern during the Thirty Years' War (1618–1648). The Spanish occupation from 1621 to 1632 ended when Protestant Swedish armies liberated the area. The city would fall to invading forces again in an especially violent incident in 1635. Croatian troops within the Austrian emperor's army plundered the city, killing 3,000 of its 3,200 residents. It would not be repopulated for about another 160 years.

Conflict did not end with the Peace of Westphalia in 1648. The Elector of the Pfalz had difficulty with many of his subjects and ordered all castles, including Nanstein, destroyed. The French repeatedly invaded and occupied the area, residing in Kaiserslautern from 1686 to 1697. Nevertheless, after the Treaty of Utrecht, it was restored to be part of the Palatinate. During the unquiet episodes in the 18th century, the Palatinate was the scene of fighting between French and German troops of different states. In 1713, the French destroyed Barbarossa's castle and the city's wall towers. From 1793 until Napoleon's defeat at Waterloo in 1815, the area was under French administration.

=== Bavarian province ===
As French power declined after 1815, Kaiserslautern and the Palatinate became a Bavarian province and remained so until 1918. After World War I, French troops again occupied the Palatinate for several years.

=== World War II ===
In World War II, Allied bombing destroyed more than 85% of Kaiserslautern. Today 25% of Kaiserslautern is made up of buildings from before 1945. The railway and several main roads were primary targets, with the heaviest attacks occurring on 7 January, 11 August, and 28 September 1944. On 20 March 1945, as part of Operation Undertone, as the last of the 1st Army crossed the Rhine at Remagen, the U.S. 80th Division, 319th Infantry, part of the 3rd US Army, seized Kaiserslautern without resistance. American forces would occupy the city until July 1945, when it was transferred to their French counterparts.

The city became part of the French occupation zone after the Second World War. The establishment of the state of Rhineland-Palatinate was ordered on 30 August 1946 as the last state in the western occupation zones by ordinance No. 57 of the French military government under General Marie-Pierre Kœnig. Little reconstruction took place until the currency reform of 1948. The pace of the economy remained slow until 1952, when construction for newly established garrisons of American troops, in particular the nearby Ramstein Air Base, brought economic growth to the area.

Unexploded ordnance from WWII continues to be discovered in and around Kaiserslautern. In May 2012, an unexploded 250-pound (110 kg) Allied bomb was found, buried deeply and reportedly covered by a water pipe, during a construction project in the downtown area of the city. On 5 September 2013, another WWII bomb was found during construction near the train station in Enkenbach-Alsenborn.

=== Cold War era ===
In the late 1940s, the Kaiserslautern area became the largest U.S. garrison outside the United States (Kaiserslautern Military Community). On 14 November 1956, a U.S. Air Force F-86 fighter jet crashed into the district office in the Burgstrasse / Maxstrasse area. In addition to the pilot, two civilians were killed, and numerous others were wounded.

With the incorporation of the previously independent communities of Dansenberg, Erfenbach, Erlenbach, Hohenecken, Mölschbach, Morlautern and Siegelbach on 7 June 1969, Kaiserslautern became a city. The University of Kaiserslautern was founded in 1970.

Industry flourished around the time of the first oil crisis (1973). In the 1970s, many industrial companies went through a crisis. In 1981, the spinning mill went bankrupt; Pfaff and Opel fired employees. The downsizing of the American garrison and the withdrawal of the French garrison cost more jobs.

=== 21st Century ===
In 2002, renovations of the Fritz-Walter-Stadion began, concluding in 2006 ahead of the 2006 FIFA World Cup. In 2015, a mall called "K-in-Lautern", opened.

During the COVID-19 pandemic, a joint German-US response to the crisis was carried out in the city. The city's economy recovered well after the pandemic, hosting its first local Pride parade and Oktoberfest in 2025.

== Climate ==
Kaiserslautern has a moderate climate with adequate rainfall year-round. It is classified as a "Cfb" (Oceanic climate) by the Köppen Climate Classification system. On 16 September 2020 the temperature reached 38.2°C which was the highest temperature recorded since 1901.

Climate data for Kaiserslautern
Month	Jan	Feb	Mar	Apr	May	Jun	Jul	Aug	Sep	Oct	Nov	Dec	Year
Mean daily maximum °C (°F)	4 (39)	5 (41)	10 (50)	13 (55)	19 (66)	22 (72)	25 (77)	25 (77)	20 (68)	15 (59)	9 (48)	5 (41)	14 (58)
Daily mean °C (°F)	1.3 (34.3)	2.1 (35.8)	5.7 (42.3)	9.5 (49.1)	13.9 (57.0)	15.0 (59.0)	19.1 (66.4)	18.4 (65.1)	14.3 (57.7)	10.0 (50.0)	5.2 (41.4)	2.3 (36.1)	9.7 (49.5)
Mean daily minimum °C (°F)	−1 (30)	−2 (28)	2 (36)	3 (37)	8 (46)	12 (54)	14 (57)	13 (55)	9 (48)	6 (43)	3 (37)	1 (34)	6 (42)
Average precipitation mm (inches)	67 (2.6)	57 (2.2)	58 (2.3)	45 (1.8)	69 (2.7)	64 (2.5)	64 (2.5)	63 (2.5)	56 (2.2)	66 (2.6)	68 (2.7)	87 (3.4)	764 (30)
Average precipitation days	18	15	13	15	14	14	15	14	13	14	16	17	178
Average relative humidity (%)	86	83	76	71	70	75	76	79	80	83	88	90	80
Mean monthly sunshine hours	50	77	133	185	206	221	234	220	164	102	52	40	1,684
Source 1: Deutscher Wetterdienst(precipitation-sun)
Source 2: Wetterkontor

== Culture, tourism, and sports ==
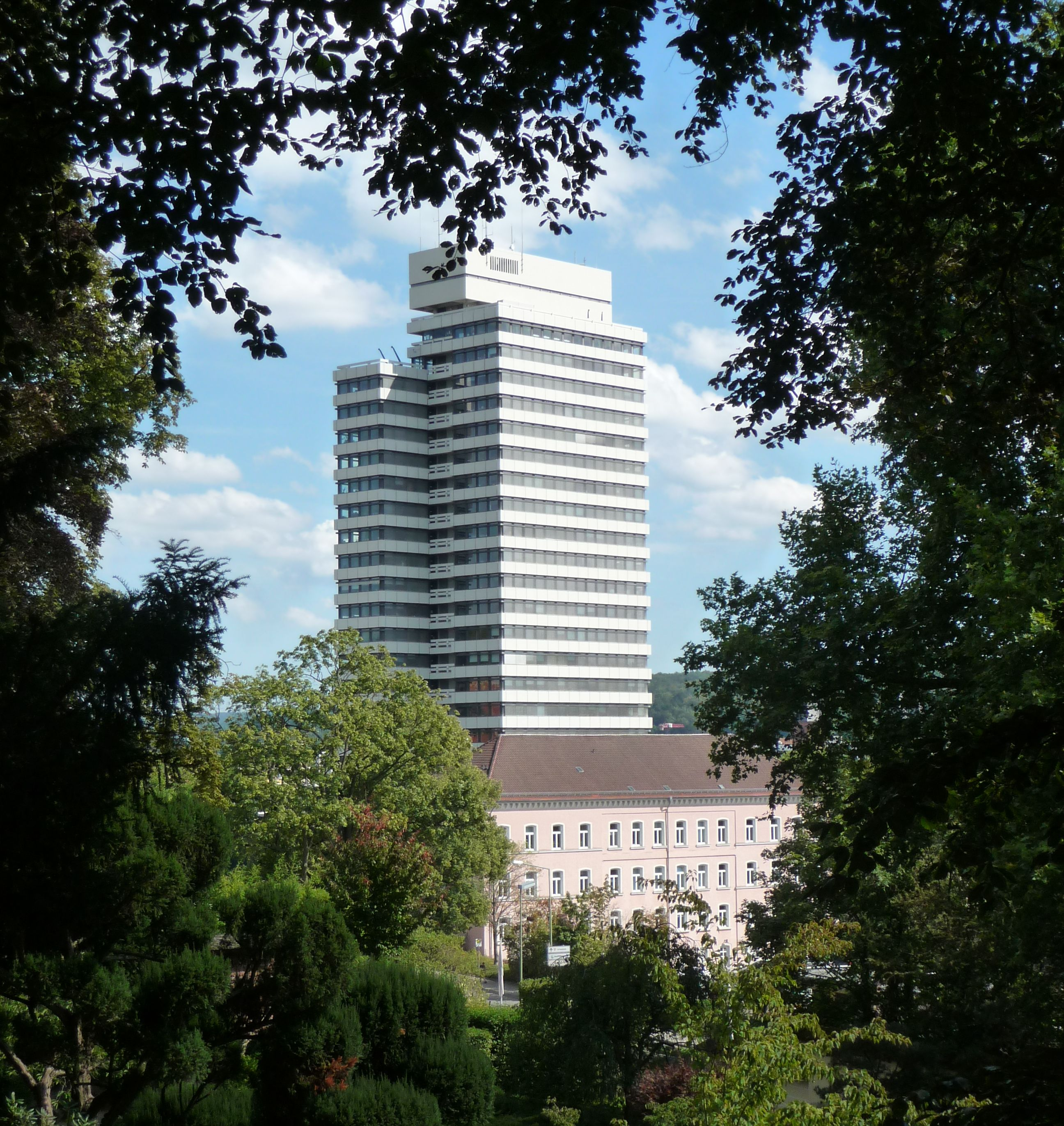
Kaiserslautern Town Hall

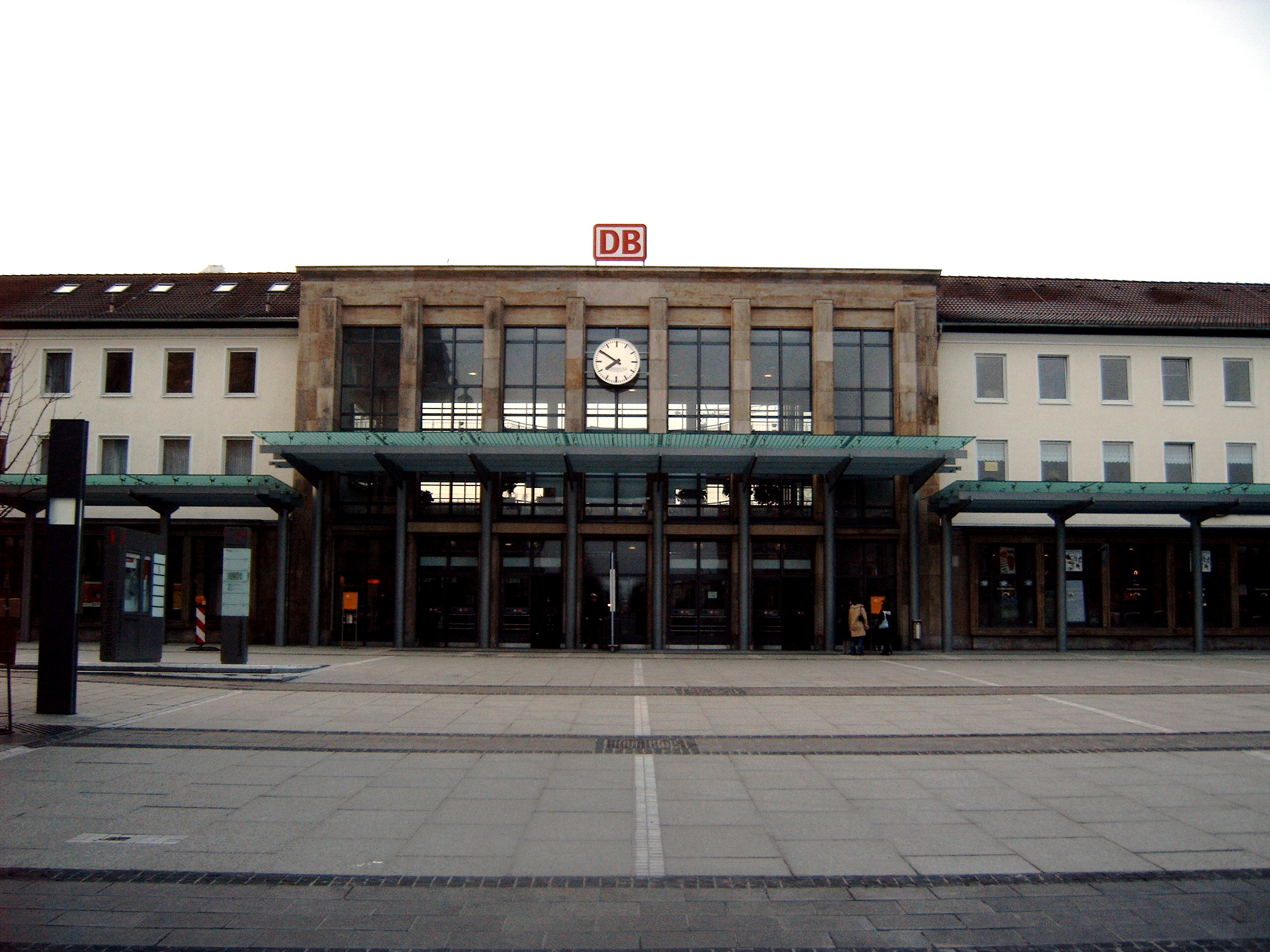
Hauptbahnhof (Main Railway Station)

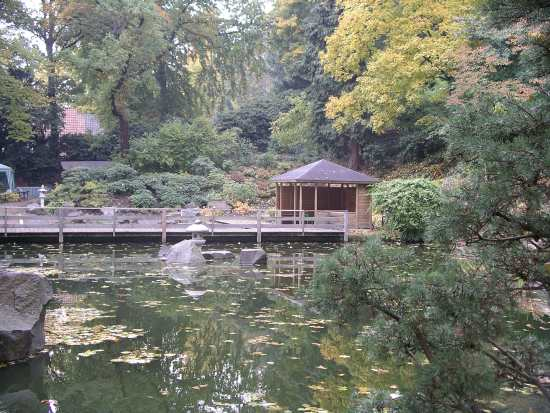
The Japanese Garden in the botanic gardens

Modern-day Kaiserslautern is a centre of information and communications technology. It is home to RPTU University Kaiserslautern-Landau, a technical college, and many international research institutes located throughout the city. Kaiserslautern is a popular destination for tourists, offering a range of attractions and sites for tourists to visit.

Town Hall Kaiserslautern is one of the tallest buildings and is located in the city centre. The bar and coffee shop on the top floor provides a panoramic view of the city and the surrounding countryside.

The tallest building in the centre of Kaiserslautern is St. Mary's, a Roman Catholic church, whilst the highest structure in all Kaiserslautern is the television tower in the suburb of Dansenberg, southwest of the city centre.

Kaiserslautern's large botanical garden features a Japanese-style garden. Another unusual feature is the Waschmühle (also known as "Wesch"), an enormous 160-metre (520 ft) public swimming pool that is the largest in Europe. There are several pedestrian-only shopping zones with numerous and varied restaurants and bars located in the city centre surrounding the old city (Altstadt). In the Altstadt you will find the "Kaiserbrunnen", a large ornamental fountain with symbols of the city's history such as a sewing machine, as produced by the Pfaff company in the city, a football representing the city's football club and various animals that children can climb.

Kaiserslautern has a diverse culinary sector, offering visitors the chance to sample dishes from across the world.

Kaiserslautern is located in one of the largest contiguous forested areas in Central Europe, the Palatinate Forest, which offers numerous hiking trails and lakes to visitors.

=== Notable attractions ===
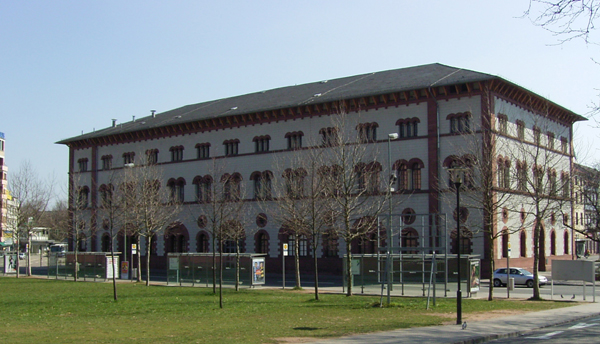
Fruchthalle

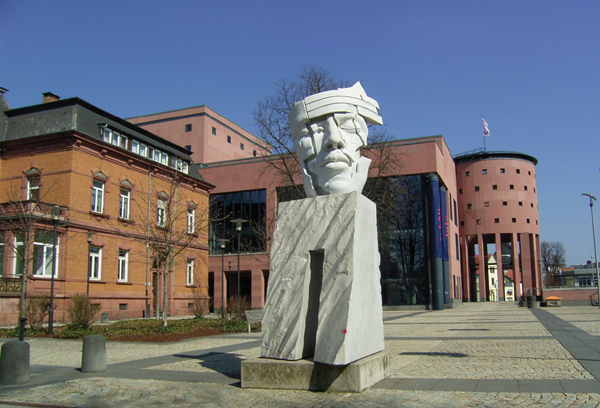
Pfalztheater Kaiserslautern

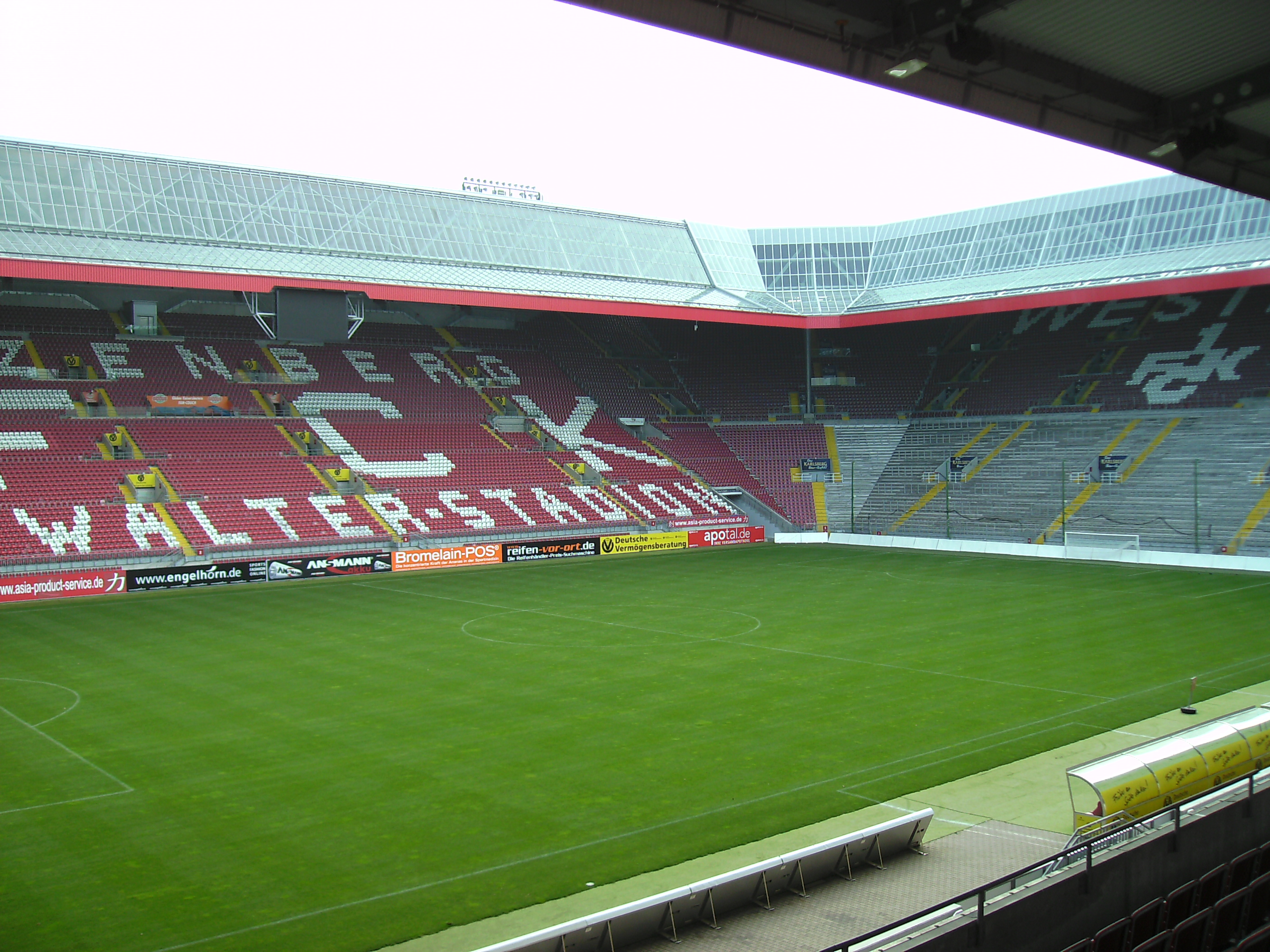
Fritz-Walter-Stadion, the stadium of 1. FC Kaiserslautern

Pfalztheater Kaiserslautern Local theatre Pfalztheater employs more than 300 people and features plays, operas, ballets, concerts, and musicals. The first German performance of West Side Story took place there. As the arts in Germany are significantly subsidized by the government, their ticket prices are reasonably low. Pfalztheater Kaiserslautern hosts the Else-Lasker-Schüler-Preis awards for German literature.

The Kammgarn The Kammgarn is classified as a historical site. It served as a spinning factory before being transformed into the cultural heart of Kaiserslautern. This renovation has preserved its historical character while incorporating the latest sound and lighting technologies. The Kammgarn stands among the top venues in Germany and serves as a first-call club for rising groups and performers as well as established jazz, rock, blues and pop artists in Europe. Performances have included international stars B.B. King, Manfred Mann's Earth Band, Pat Metheny, Uriah Heep and Jan Garbarek.

Gartenschau (garden exhibition) Better known as the 'Dino Park' because of its life-size dinosaur models, the Gartenschau is open from April through October and is popular with families. Having begun as a series of botanical displays and enjoying success at the first State Garden Exhibition of Rhineland-Palatinate in Kaiserslautern in 2000, this 22-hectare (54-acre) park has been transformed into one of the most multi-dimensional cultural centres in Germany.

Fritz-Walter-Stadion The Fritz-Walter-Stadion is a football stadium that accommodates 48,500 fans. In June 2006, after renovation, the stadium was one of 12 to host the 2006 FIFA World Cup. It is also home to 1. FC Kaiserslautern, which won the Bundesliga four times and the wheelchair basketball team FCK Rolling Devils. In the 2025–26 season, 1. FC Kaiserslautern recorded an average home attendance of 46,176 across 17 matches at the Fritz-Walter-Stadion, the third-highest average in the 2. Bundesliga.

Kaiserslautern Zoo The Kaiserslautern Zoo was founded in 1968 and is located in Kaiserslautern's Siegelbach neighbourhood. It is home to many different animals, including some nearly extinct regional species.

=== Museums and libraries ===
- Palatinate Gallery of Art/Pfalzgalerie (art gallery, mainly pictures and sculptures from the 19th and 20th centuries)
- Wadgasserhof / Theodor-Zink-Museum (local history)
- Stadtbibliothek (Municipal Library)
- Universitätsbibliothek (university library of Kaiserslautern)
- Hochschulbibliothek (Bibliothek der Fachhochschule)
- Pfalzbibliothek (scientific library with a main focus on the Electorate of the Palatinate issues)

Other places of interest in Kaiserslautern, and the surrounding area, are:

- The Humberg Tower, an observation tower on the Humberg hill, which was built in 1900 and offers a great view over the Palatinate Forest
- Karlstal (a whitewater canyon)
- Kaiserpfalz, the castle of emperor Barbarossa (Redbeard)
- Nanstein Castle, Landstuhl, a castle in the district
- Hohenecken Castle, in a suburb/ward of Kaiserslautern
- Gartenschau, a horticultural show, including the largest dinosaur show in the EU
- Quaidersberg (394 metres or 1,293 feet), a hill and natural monument 500 metres (1,600 feet) outside the city

== Education, science, and business ==
=== Universities ===
- The Technical University of Kaiserslautern was founded on 13 July 1970. Earlier, it was part of the twin University of Trier/Kaiserslautern. It started with the departments of Mathematics, Physics and Technology. Later many more faculties were added.
- University of Applied Sciences, Kaiserslautern was founded in 1971. The main departments include Applied Logistics & Polymer Sciences, Building and Design, Business Administration, Engineering and Computer Sciences / Microsystems Technology.

=== Research centres ===
- German Research Centre for Artificial Intelligence
- Fraunhofer Institute for Experimental Software Engineering IESE
- Fraunhofer Institute for Industrial Mathematics ITWM
- Max Planck Institute for Software Systems
- Association Internationale pour les Technologies Objets

=== Businesses ===
Kaiserslautern has a broad-based commercial economy. Among the big companies located in the city are:

- Adam Opel AG (engines and components factory)
- AMEC Earth & Environmental (environmental consulting and engineering)
- Avid Technology (formerly Blue-Order)
- Empolis GmbH (content & knowledge management software)
- General Dynamics European Land Systems-Germany (until 2002 Eisenwerke Kaiserslautern; amphibious vehicles, mobile bridges for military use)
- IKEA
- John Deere Research and Development branch
- Johnson Controls, formerly Keiper (carseats)
- Pfaff Industrie Maschinen AG (sewing machines)
- EuroMaint

== Religion ==
=== Churches ===
The largest church is St. Mary's (Marienkirche), a Roman Catholic church. There is also the historic Protestant Church of the Apostle (Apostelkirche). At the heart of the city is the large and old Stiftskirche (also Protestant). All three have large pipe organs and occasionally host concerts.

=== Mosques ===
In Kaiserslautern, there is an Islamic Centre for the Muslim communities situated in the centre of the city. The Ditib Fatih Camii is a Turkish mosque in Kaiserslautern.

=== Synagogues ===
The synagogue in 1909

The city was once the site of the magnificent Moorish Revival Kaiserslautern Synagogue. Built in 1886, the synagogue's great dome could be seen from across the city skyline. The Nazi government forcibly demolished the synagogue on 31 August 1938. The reason provided for the synagogue's demolition was to create a route for a Nazi parade, but the event served as an example of the Nazis' underlying intentions, including ethnic cleansing in The Holocaust, even a few months before the Kristallnacht. A memorial archway was constructed at the site in 2002.

== US military base ==
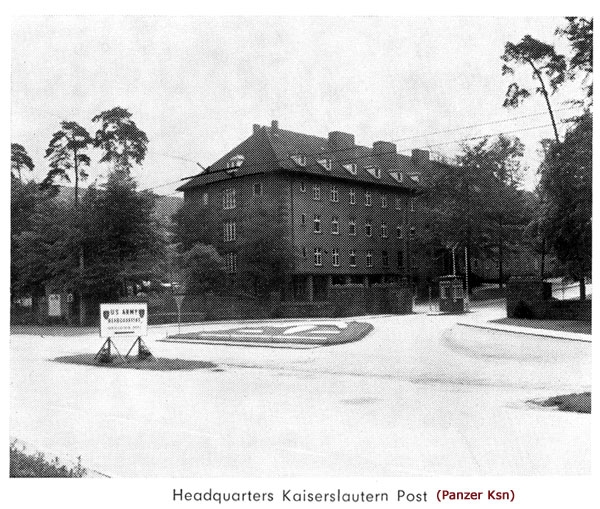
1950 photograph of barracks in Kaiserslautern

Between 1950 and 1955, Kaiserslautern developed into the largest US military community outside of the United States. For this reason Kaiserslautern is also referred to as "K-town"; a term coined by the early American military population who had difficulty pronouncing the name. The Kaiserslautern Military Community (KMC) is a combined community consisting of Army and Air Force components. The KMC consists of Army facilities at Kleber 32nd Air Defense HQ and Signal Corps, Panzer, Dänner-Kaserne, Landstuhl, Miesau, Einsiedlerhof, Pirmasens, Sembach, Baumholder, Rhine Ordnance Barracks and Pulaski Barracks, along with Air Force facilities located at Ramstein Air Base, Vogelweh, and Kapaun Air Station.

== Twin towns – sister cities ==
Kaiserslautern is twinned with:

- Davenport, United States (1960)
- Douzy, France (1967)
- Saint-Quentin, France (1967)
- Newham (London), England, United Kingdom (1974)
- Bunkyō (Tokyo), Japan (1988)
- Brandenburg an der Havel, Germany (1988)
- Pleven, Bulgaria (1999)
- Columbia, United States (2000)
- Guimarães, Portugal (2000)
- Banja Luka, Bosnia and Herzegovina (2003)

=== Friendly cities ===
Kaiserslautern also has friendly relations with:

- Bitola, North Macedonia
- Igualada, Spain
- Rotherham, England, United Kingdom
- Silkeborg, Denmark (terminated in 2016)

== Notable people ==
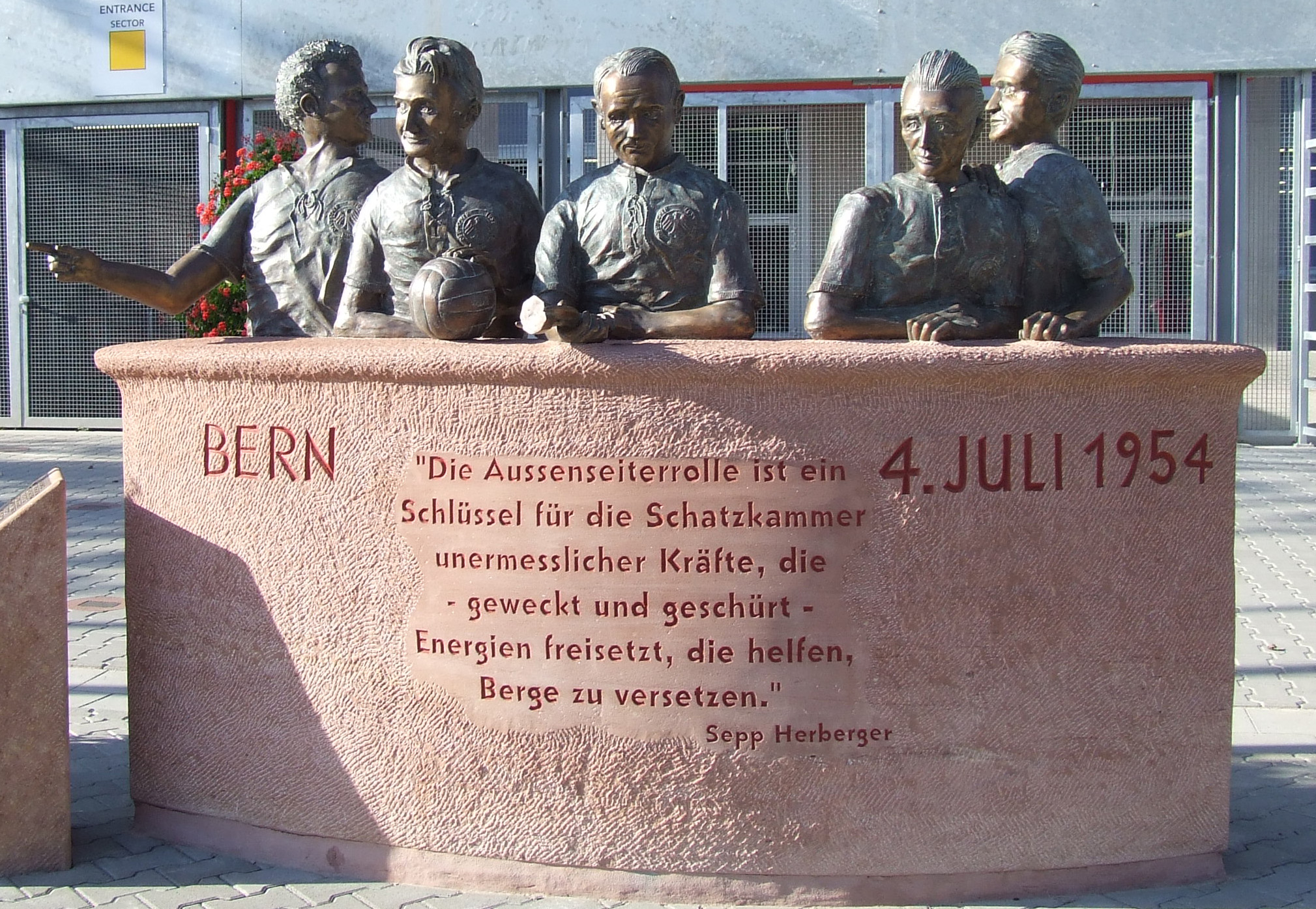
Memorial for the 1. FC Kaiserslautern players in the 1954 FIFA World Cup Final. From left to right: Werner Liebrich, Fritz Walter, Werner Kohlmeyer, Horst Eckel and Ottmar Walter.

- Countess Palatine Dorothea of Simmern (1581–1631), countess
- Mathias Abel (born 1981), footballer
- Otto Bradfisch (1903–1994), economist, jurist, and SS-Obersturmbannführer
- Wolfgang Demtröder (born 1931), physicist and spectroscopist
- Ludwig Fischer (1905–1947), National Socialist lawyer, politician and a convicted war criminal
- Mark Forster (born 1983), singer
- Wilhelm Frick (1877–1946), politician of the NSDAP; Reich Minister of the Interior in the Hitler Cabinet 1933–1943
- Florian Fromlowitz (born 1986), footballer
- Reiner Gies (born 1963), boxer, Olympic medalist
- Stefanie Giesinger (born 1996), model
- Theo Härder (born 1945), computer science professor
- Wilhelm Helfer (1886–1954), Nazi SA general
- Johann Adam Philipp Hepp (1797–1867), physician and lichenologist
- Hans Robert Hiegel (born 1954), architect
- Raphael Holzdeppe (born 1989), pole vaulter, world champion
- Johann Heinrich Jung (1740–1817), author
- Klaus Knopper (born 1968), electrical engineer and free software developer
- Werner Kohlmeyer (1924–1974), footballer, 1954 World Cup winner
- Werner Liebrich (1927–1995), footballer, 1954 World Cup winner
- David May (1848–1927), Jewish emigrant to America and founder of department stores that later incorporated Macy's
- Markus Merk (born 1962), football referee
- Karl Mildenberger (1937–2018), heavyweight boxer
- Willi Orbán (born 1992), footballer
- Vanden Plas (formed 1986), progressive metal band
- Johan Adam Pollich (1741–1780), doctor, botanist and entomologist
- Johann Heinrich Roos (1631–1685), Baroque landscape painter and etcher
- Albert Speer, Jr. (1934–2017), architect and urban planner
- Heinrich Steiner (1911–2009), painter and printmaker
- Johanna Terwin (1884–1962), actress
- Stefanie Tücking (1962–2018), radio and television presenter
- Fritz Walter (1920–2002), footballer, 1954 World Cup winner
- Ottmar Walter (1924–2013), footballer, 1954 World Cup winner
- Elmar Weindel (born 1929), diplomat
- Zedd (born 1988), Russian-German record producer, DJ, multi-instrumentalist and songwriter

== See also ==
- Betzenberg, a Kaiserslautern district
- Betzenberg Wildlife Park
