= Betzenberg Wildlife Park =

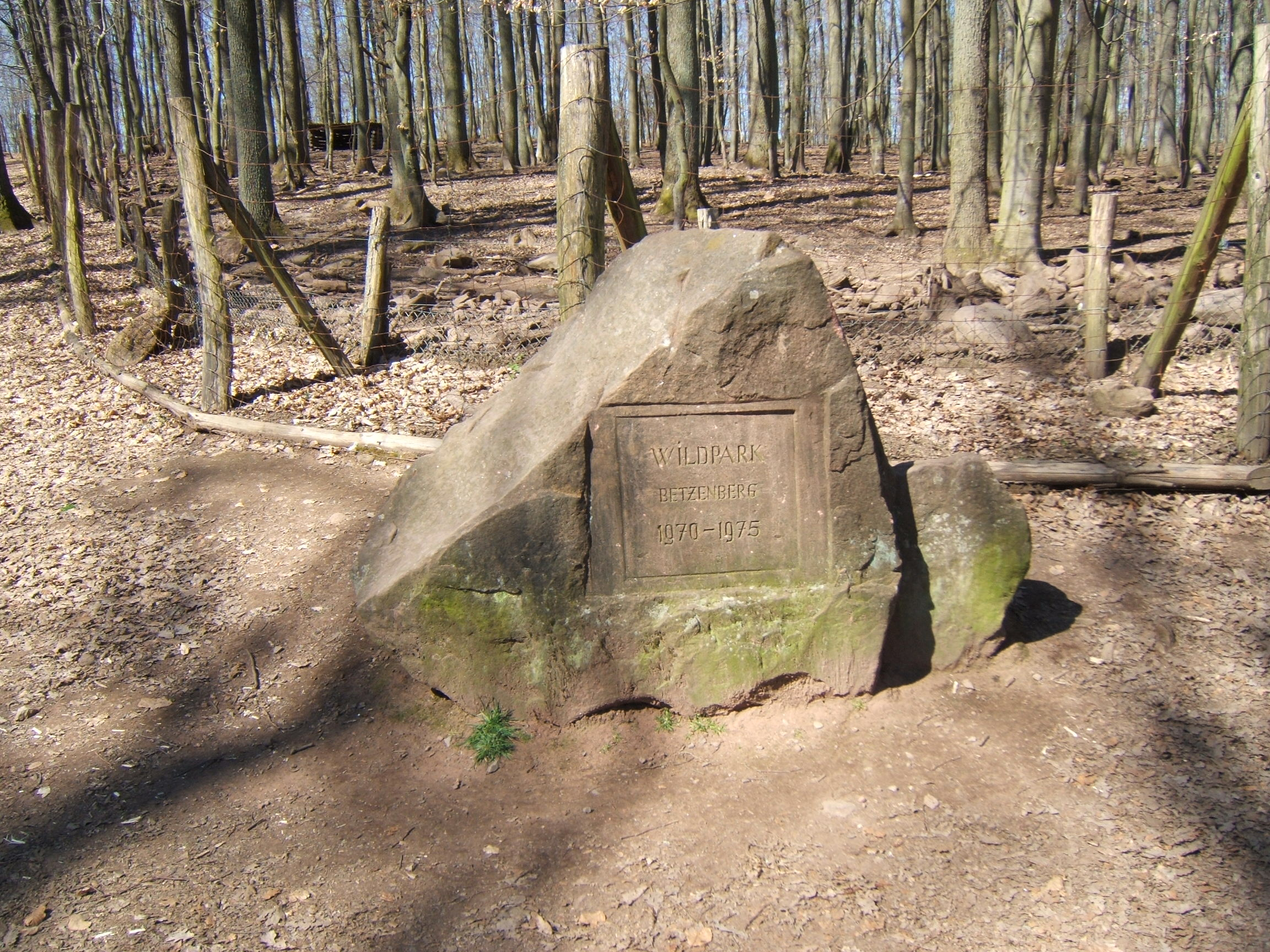
- Stone and inscription
- Interactive map of Betzenberg Wildlife Park
- 49°26′00″N 7°47′30″E
- Date opened: 1970
- Location: Kaiserslautern, Germany

The Betzenberg Wildlife Park (German: Wildpark am Betzenberg) in Kaiserslautern, Germany, was founded in 1970 with the aim of enabling the population to observe native species of animals - including those that used to live wild around Kaiserslautern but are no longer native there today.

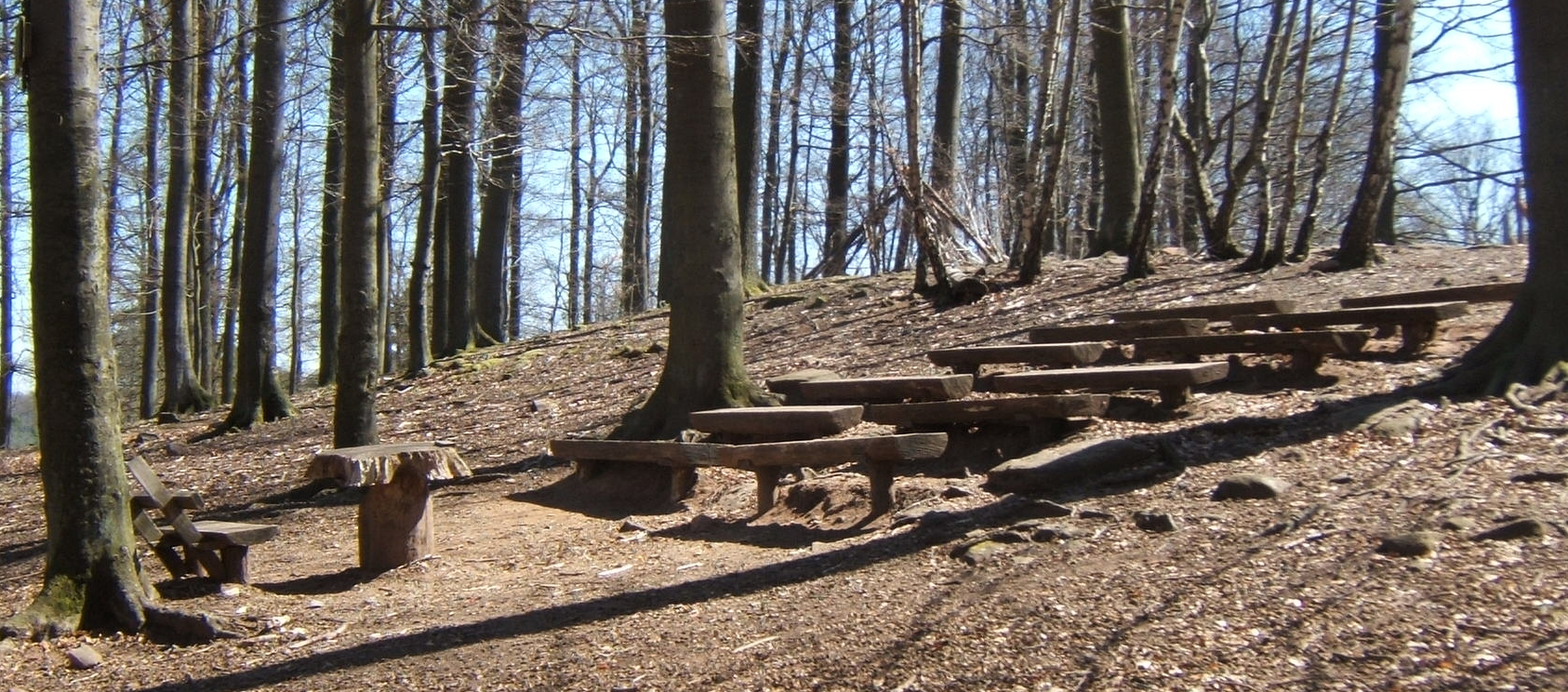
Woodland school

Today the park also has a role in protecting species that are threatened by extinction, such as the Wisent and other endangered animals. The park is home to owls, wild boar, lynx, mouflon, bred back tarpans, aurochs and other animals. It also has a woodland school in the middle of an old forest that, in places is 120 years old, as well as the Eichenkranz, a stand of trees estimated to be about 300 years old. The park is open all year round and entry is free.
