= Siegelbach =

- Village (part of Kaiserslautern)
- Location within Germany
- Coordinates: 49°28′08″N 7°41′24″E
- Country: Germany
- State: Rhineland-Palatinate

Population
  - Total: 2,600
- Time zone: UTC+1 (CET)
  - Summer (DST): UTC+2 (CEST)
- Postal code: 67661
- Area code: 0631
- ISO 3166 code: DE

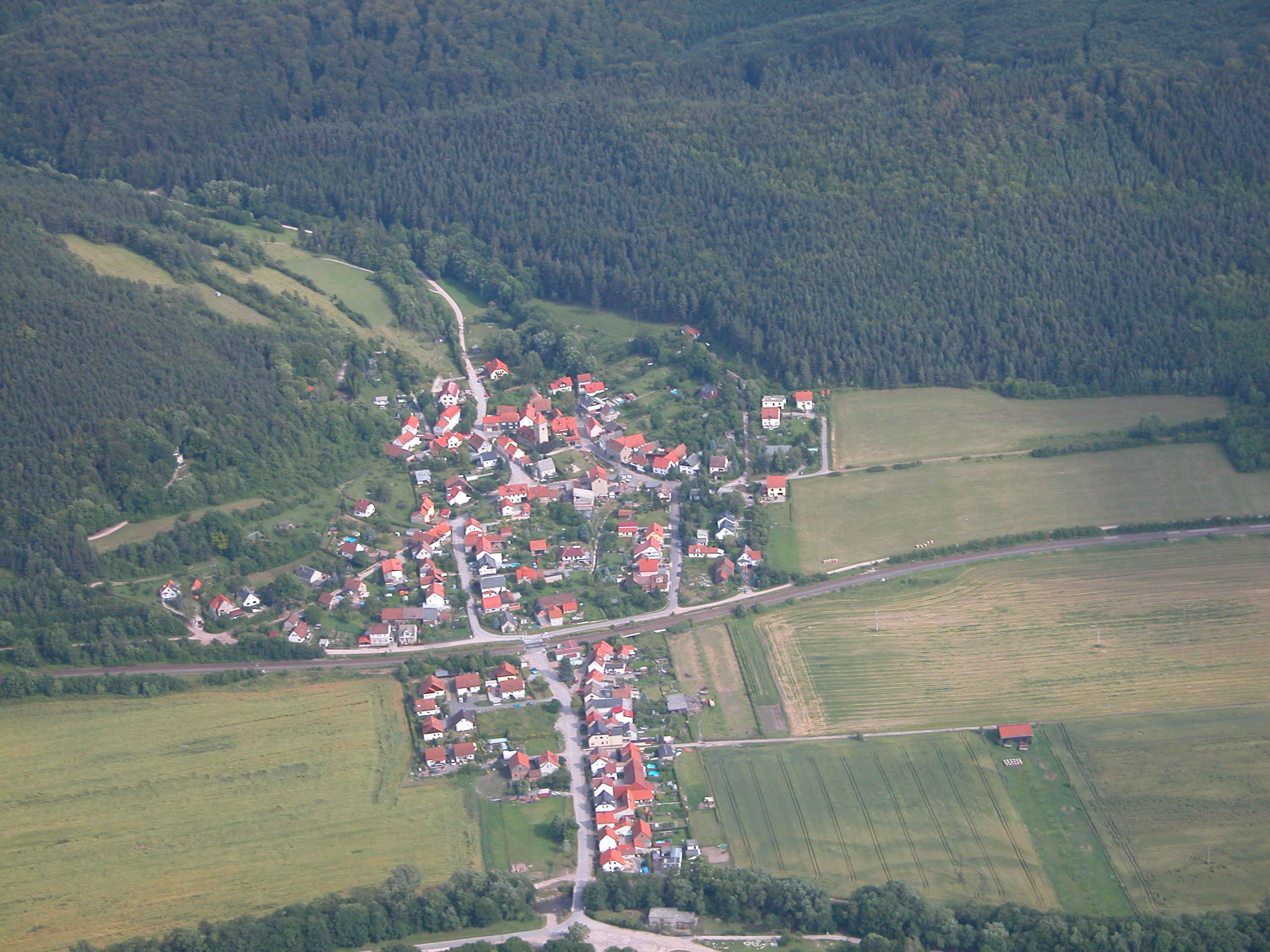
Aerial view of the area

Siegelbach (German pronunciation: [ˈziːɡl̩ˌbax]) is a village located just northwest of the city of Kaiserslautern, in the heart of Germany's Rheinland-Pfalz. The village, with its 2,600 inhabitants, is included in the urban district (Stadtkreis) of Kaiserslautern, as incorporated in 1969.

The arms of Siegelbach can be viewed at the Heraldry Wiki.
