= List of mountains and hills of the Palatine Forest =

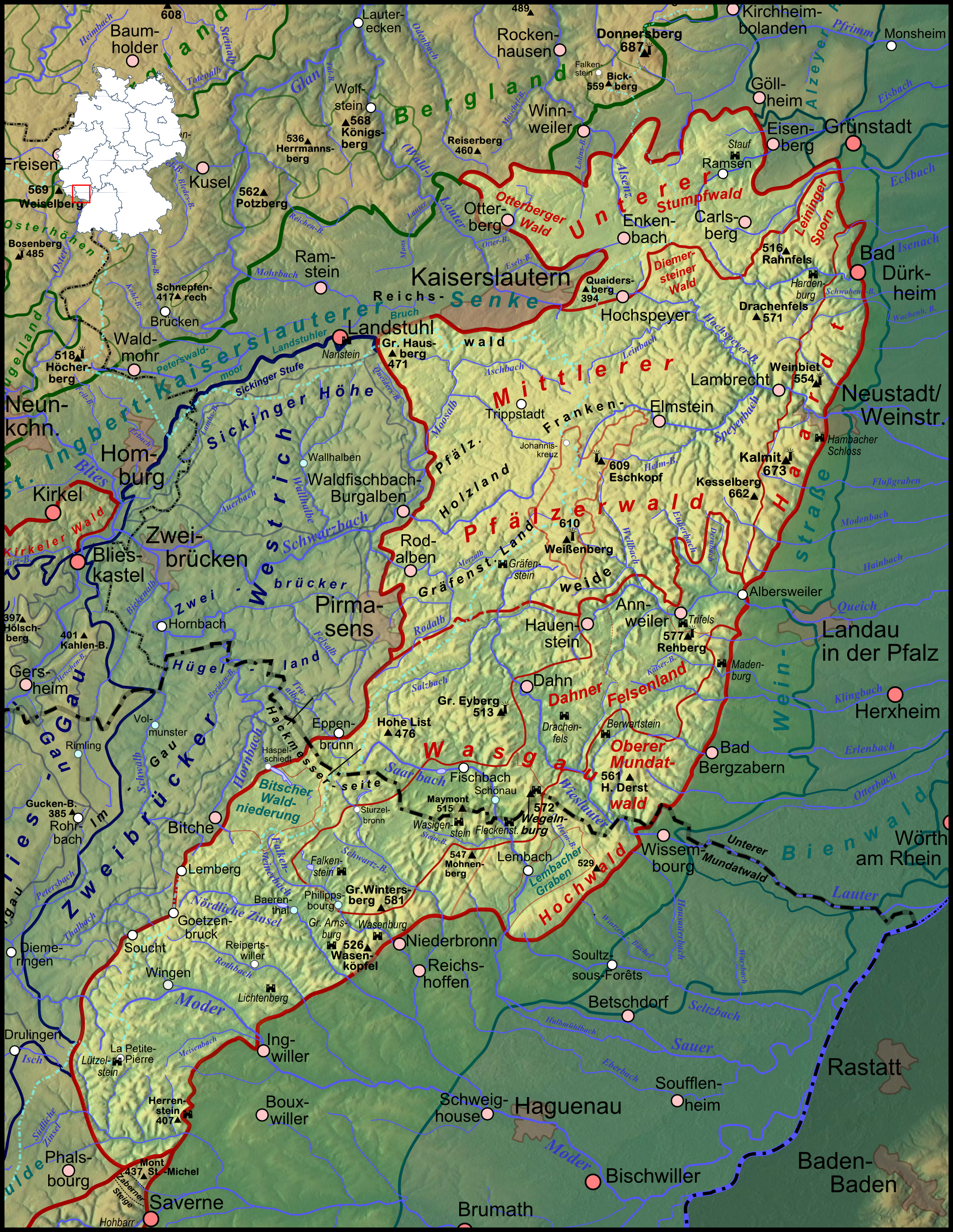
The Palatine Forest-North Vosges natural region (highlighted and outline in red, Palatine Forest to the north)

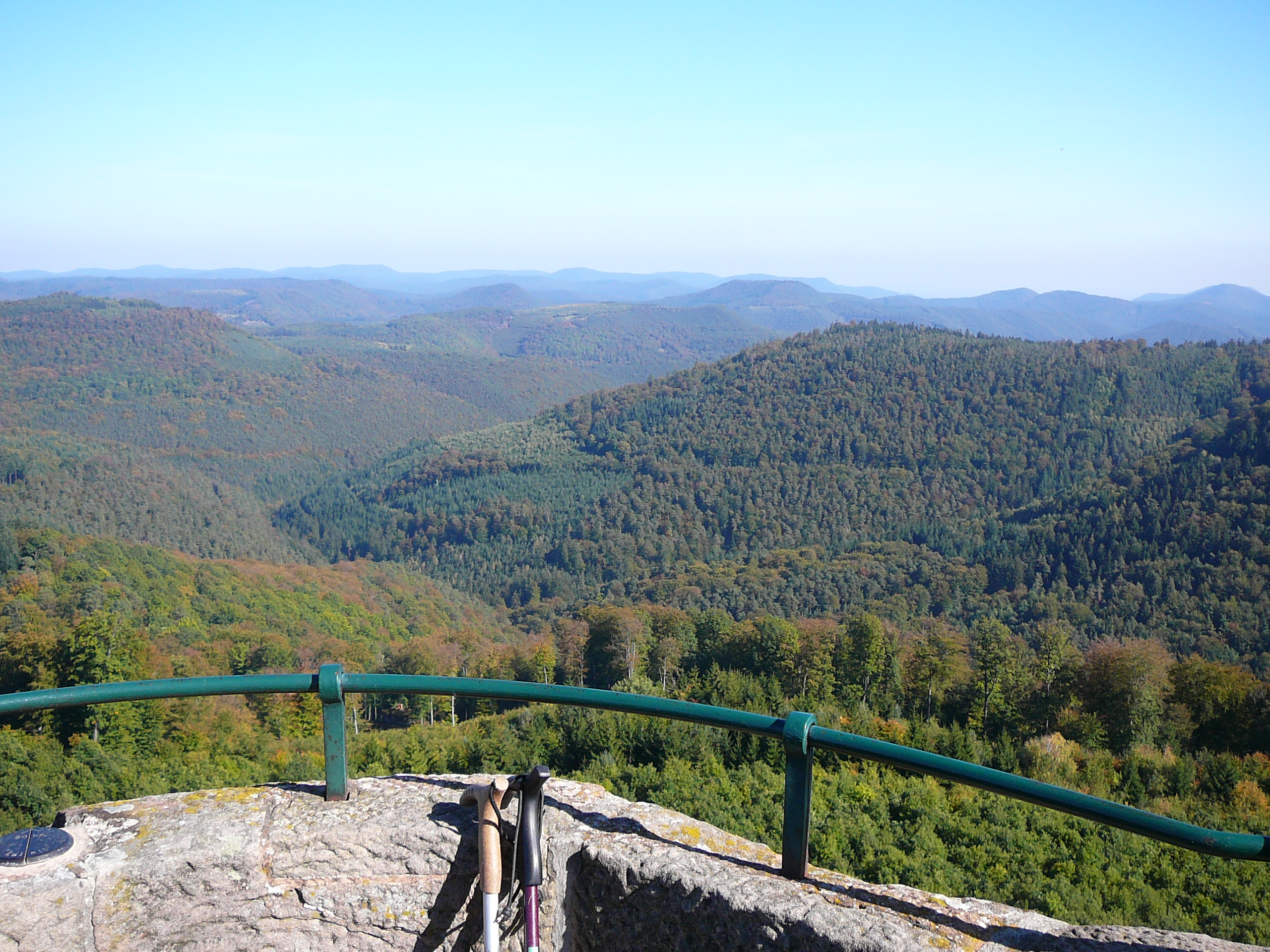
View from the Luitpold Tower on the Weißenberg over the central Palatine Forest to the east

This list of mountains and hills in the Palatine Forest contains a selection of the highest or more notable peaks located in the natural region of the Palatine Forest in the German state of Rhineland-Palatinate (maximum 672.6 m above sea level (NHN)).

The mountain range is formed from a slab of Bunter sandstone, about 500 metres thick, that is characterized by a complex relief with deeply incised V-shaped valleys, many different hill shapes and dense forests. Because its rock strata were tilted during the formation of the Upper Rhine Graben and descend from east to west, its highest points, which climb to over 600 m above NHN, are found in the Haardt, a long ridge that forms the edge of the Palatine Forest in the east above the Rhine Plain. In the central Palatine Forest is the plateau of Frankenweide, in which several more mountains are located that also exceed the 600 metre mark. By contrast, the hills in the north of the Palatine Forest, i. e. in the Stumpfwald and Otterberg Forest, only reach about 350 to 450 m above NHN; they are largely embedded in erosion surfaces and rise only around 100 to 150 metres above them. Considerably more varied are the hills of the southern Palatine Forest, a region also known as the Wasgau which, as a unified natural region, crosses the border and runs as far as the Col de Saverne. Its small-scale surface topology includes numerous, different hill shapes – characterized by conical hills for example – with heights range from 450 to 550 m above NHN. They often exhibit bizarre rock formations, that in many cases have been used for the construction and location of rock and hill castles.

Because not all the mountains and hills of the Palatine Forest can be included in this list, a number of criteria have been used to make the selection. Of prime importance have been their geomorphological (e. g. rock, relief etc.), biological (e. g. flora like forest coverage and contiguity), cultural historic (e. g. castles, former cultic sites), touristic (e. g. observation towers, Palatine Forest Club huts etc.) and infrastructural features (e. g. transport routes, industrial usage etc.).

== Table ==
Entries in the table are sorted by height in metres above sea level (NHN). However, the table may also be sorted by the data in columns 1 to 5 by clicking the symbol at the head of the wanted column. In the "Name" column, alternative names for the mountains and hills are given in brackets, in small, italic font. Names that recur are disambiguated by place names in brackets and small font.

The abbreviations used in the table are explained below.

Name (with coor- dinates)	Height (m above sea level (NHN))	Natural region	Sub- region	County, Municipality	Comments	Image
Kalmit (49.319164°N 8.082547°E)	672.6	Central; Palatine Forest	Haardt	Südliche Weinstraße; about 3 km west of Maikammer	Highest mountain of the Palatine Forest; entirely wooded, mainly pines, in lower regions sweet chestnuts; observation tower (no access); Kalmithaus (PWV hut); panoramic view to the east and south; meteorological station; transmission tower; felsenmeer on the Hüttenberg (see below); summit easily accessible on the Kalmithöhenstraße (Landesstraße 515) from Maikammer, summit only a few hundred metres by footpath from the car park.	The Kalmit
Kesselberg (49.284268°N 8.045211°E)	661.8	Central; Palatine Forest	Haardt	Südliche Weinstraße; about 4 km northwest of Weyher	Second highest summit of the Palatine Forest; trapezoidally shaped ridge-hill; entirely wooded (pines, spruce, beech); bowl-shaped rock hollows, sometimes falsely referred to as glacial kettles or moulins; accessible on waymarked footpaths; start at car park of Lolosruhe on the Kreisstraße 6 (Edenkoben–Forsthaus Heldenstein)	Kesselberg, view from the Modenbachtal
Roßberg (49.261335°N 8.029547°E)	637.0	Central; Palatine Forest	Haardt	Südliche Weinstraße; about 3 km northwest of Burrweiler	Third highest mountain of the Palatine Forest; entirely covered by mixed forest; castle ruins of Scharfeneck on its western slopes; Landauer hut, a PWV hut, in the saddle between the Rossberg and Orensberg (Zimmerbrunnen); the summit is accessible on partly overgrown forest and woodland tracks, start at the woodland car park of Dreibuchen on the L 506 Ramberg–Weyher	Roßberg, Blick vom Frankenfelsen
Hochberg (St. Martin) (49.298766°N 8.071518°E)	635.3	Central; Palatine Forest	Haardt	Südliche Weinstraße; about 2 km west of St. Martin	Prominent ridge-hill on the edge of the Rhine Graben; south of the Triefenbach valley, north of the Altbach valley; entirely wooded, mainly pines; Edenkoben peace memorial on the Werderberg, a subpeak to the southeast over the Rhine Plain; Kropsburg castle on the eastern edge of the mountain; summit only accessible over partly waymarked hiking trails; start at e. g. woodland car parks in the Triefenbach valley on Kreisstraße 6 from Edenkoben to Forsthaus Heldenstein	Hochberg near St. Martin (Palatinate): View from the Weinstraße looking west
Hüttenberg (49.315891°N 8.070617°E)	620.1	Central; Palatine Forest	Haardt	Südliche Weinstraße; about 3 km west of St. Martin	Southwestern subpeak of the Kalmit; mainly covered in pines; extensive felsenmeer on its elongated hill ridge, which is a blockfield of Karlstal beds (Middle Bunter sandstone); vom car park below the summit of the Kalmit; easily climbed after a few hundred metres on waymarked hiking trails.	The Hüttenberg seen from Sankt Martin valley
Hohe Loog (49.332436°N 8.096216°E)	618.7	Central; Palatine Forest	Haardt	Neustadt borough; about 4 km southwest of the town itself	Ridge-hill with summit plateau, the Hohe Loog Ebene; part of a ridge that runs from the Kalmit northeastwards to the Nollenkopf; boulders on the summit plateau of Middle Bunter sandstones ("Karlstal beds"); entirely wooded, predominantly pines; in the summit region is the Hohe Loog Haus (hut managed by the PWV); easily accessible on waymarked hiking trails; start at e. g. woodland car park at Hahnenschritt (Kalmithöhenstraße, Landesstraße 515 from Maikammer)	View of the Hohe Loog (centre, right, by the Hambacher Schloss
Schafkopf (49.31196°N 8.048751°E)	616.8	Central; Palatine Forest	Interior woodlands	Südliche Weinstraße; about 3.5 km west of St. Martin	Part of a ridge that runs from the Steigerkopf to the Rotsohlberg; entirely covered by mixed forest; an old boundary path between the municipal lands of Maikammer and Sankt Martin runs over the summit between Ritterstein 303 Suppenschüssel and Sankt Martiner Fronbaum; start at woodland car parks of Totenkopf (Landesstraße 514 St. Martin–Breitenstein) or Lolosruhe	Summit with cairns and old boundary stone
Steigerkopf (Schänzel) (49.297101°N 8.026242°E)	613.6	Central; Palatine Forest	Interior woodlands	Südliche Weinstraße; about 3.5 km northwest of Weyher	Mountain hub; observation tower; in 1794 during battle between French and Prussians several earthworks (Schänzel) were built in the surrounding area, monuments; dense, mixed forest; several huts and forest inns in the surrounding area; access via Burrweiler or Edenkoben on Kreisstraße 6; footpath (about 1 km) from Lolosruhe car park	Summit of the Steigerkopf and Schänzel Tower
Blättersberg (49.275631°N 8.065274°E)	613.2	Central; Palatine Forest	Haardt	Südliche Weinstraße; about 2 km west of Weyher	Ridge-hill on the edge of the Rhine Graben; entirely wooded (mainly pines with scattered beech trees); observation tower on the south top (Ludwig Tower); castle ruins of Rietburg on northeast flank; start at car park near the Villa Ludwigshöhe; using the chair lift or footpath to the castle, from there is a waymarked path for about 1 km to the summit	Nordostseite of the Blättersbergs (mit Rietburg and Villa Ludwigshöhe)
Weißenberg (49.25254°N 7.825613°E)	609.9	Central; Palatine Forest	Frankenweide	Südwestpfalz, Südliche Weinstraße (Osthang); 1.5 km northwest Hermersbergerhof	Highest mountain of the Frankenweide; southernmost summit of the central mountain ridge; Luitpold Tower (observation tower); wide panoramic view over more than 350 summits; ancient-looking forest beech and oak mixed stands, core zone “source region of the Wieslauter” in the Biosphere Reserve Palatine Forest-North Vosges; rock formations of the Karlstal beds in the immediately summit region and wider surrounding area; easily accessible on a waymarked footpath; start at woodland car parks of Holländerklotz or Luitpoldstein on the Kreisstraße 56. from Hermersbergerhof about 1 to 2 km northwards	View from the Hermersbergerhof to the Weißenberg (with its Luitpold Tower)
Mosisberg (49.299956°N 7.853873°E)	608.7	Central; Palatine Forest	Frankenweide	Südwestpfalz; about 3 km north of Hofstätten	Second highest mountain of the Frankenweide; elongated ridge; part of the Palatine Main Watershed; mixed woods mainly of beech and oak; former US Air Force directional radio site on the summit region; small Hochmoor ( the Mosisbruch) in a mountain hollow about 1 km to the southeast; summit easily accessible on roadway; start at junction on the Landesstraße 496 (Leimen–Johanniskreuz) to the Langerkopf	View of the Mosisberg (rear centre) from the Weißenberg
Eschkopf (49.310155°N 7.853637°E)	608.3	Central; Palatine Forest	Frankenweide	Südwestpfalz; 3.5 km north of Hofstätten	Central "mountain hub" of the Palatine Forest; less prominent, domed summit; on the main watershed; hydrological centre; Eschkopf observation tower (Eschkopfturm); panoramic view (somewhat restricted); easily climbed on waymarked footpath; start from the B 48 junction to Iggelbach, from there about 500 m to the summit	Summit region of the Eschkopf with the Eschkopf Tower. Behind: the German Air Safety radar site
Morschenberg (49.305399°N 8.038473°E)	608.3	Central; Palatine Forest	Interior woodlands	Südwestpfalz; about 4 km west of St. Martin	Part of the ridge running from the Steigerkopf to the Rotsohlberg; less prominent ridge-hill; entirely with mixed forest, mainly pine and beech, covered; accessible by footpath, about 0.5 km north of the Lolosruhe car park (Kreisstraße 5 from Edenkoben to Forsthaus Heldenstein)	Morchenberg summit region
Rotsohlberg (49.318213°N 8.051391°E)	607.1	Central; Palatine Forest	Interior woodlands	Südwestpfalz; about 4 km northwest of St. Martin	Northeastern end of the ridge that starts at the Steigerkopf; ridge-hill; entirely covered by mixed forest, predominantly pine and beech; ridge easily reached on waymarked hiking trails, actual summit only accessible along a firebreak (Waldschneise); start at Totenkopf car park on the Landesstraße 514 from St. Martin to Breitenstein (Totenkopfstraße), from there about 1.5 km	View from the Hahnenschritt
Hortenkopf (49.270437°N 7.827308°E)	606.2	Central; Palatine Forest	Frankenweide	Südwestpfalz; about 3 km southwest of Hofstätten	Very inconspicuous ridge-hill; part of the central ridge of the Frankenweide; mainly mixed woods consisting of beech and oak; transmission tower on the summit; closed road to the summit; accessible via Kreisstraße 56 from Hermersbergerhof	View of the Hortenkopf with transmission tower (right). Rear left: the Weißenberg and Luitpold Tower
Taubenkopf (49.322045°N 8.088598°E)	603.8	Central; Palatine Forest	Haardt	Borough of Neustadt an der Weinstraße; ~4 km west of Diedesfeld	Northeastern subpeak of the Kalmit, immediately on the edge of the Rhine Graben; panoramic view; easily accessible on waymarked hiking trails; start at car park on Kreisstraße 515 (Kalmithöhenstraße Maikammer to Kalmit)	View of the Taubenkopf from the Hohe Loog
Teufelsberg (49.251868°N 8.053751°E)	597.6	Central; Palatine Forest	Haardt	Südliche Weinstraße; about 1.5 km west of Burrweiler	Free-standing ridge-hill on the edge of the Rhine Graben; entirely covered with pines and scattered beech trees; large boulders in the summit region (Middle Bunter sandstone, Karlstal beds); stone weather cross; St. Anne's Chapel on the eastern slopes (pilgrimage church); only accessible on waymarked hiking trails; start at car parks in Burrweiler	The Teufelsberg with the Lambertskopf (right) and St. Anne's Chapel (left)
Mühlenberg (49.275785°N 7.820334°E)	590.8	Central; Palatine Forest	Frankenweide	Südwestpfalz; roughly 4 km east of Leimen	Elongated hill ridge; part of the Palatine Main Watershed; entirely wooded (near-natural oak and beech woods); in the southeast is the core zone Quellgebiet der Wieslauter (Wartenbach valley), not accessible on forest paths; starting point: Kreisstraße 56 (K 56) towards Hermersbergerhof	View from the Weißenberg looking northwest. Centre: Mühlenberg
Hermeskopf (49.29093°N 8.003283°E)	581.3	Central; Palatine Forest	Interior woodlands	Südliche Weinstraße; roughly 4 km north of Ramberg	Ridge, part of an elongated chain of hills that runs from north to south to the Orensberg; east of the Modenbach valley; entirely wooded (beech, pine, spruce, etc.); accessible on forest paths waymarked in places; starting point: car park at the Forsthaus Heldenstein (on Kreisstraße 6 Edenkoben–Modenbachtal)	
Orensberg (49.243912°N 8.027401°E)	581.2	Central; Palatine Forest	Haardt	Südliche Weinstraße; roughly 3 km north of Albersweiler	Prominent ridge on the edge of the Rhine Graben; entirely wooded (mixed forest); Archaeological features (circular rampart and sacrifice bowl; panoramic view from the Orensfelsen; Scharfeneck Castle on the northern hillside; Landauer Hut (PWV) at the Zimmerplatz; only accessible on waymarked footpaths; starting point: z. B. forest car park in St. Johann (Albersweiler)	Orensfelsen viewing point
Rehberg (49.181703°N 7.970366°E)	576,8	Wasgau	Wasgauer Felsenland	Südliche Weinstraße; 2 km südlich of Annweiler	Prominent conical ridge with relatively high prominence; highest hill in the German part of the Wasgau; gives its name to a formation of the Lower Bunter sandstone: "Rehberg beds"; dense mixed woods; observation tower (Rehberg Tower); wide panoramic views; Rehberg spring (highest spring in the Palatinate); roughly 1 km northwest is the rock massif of the Asselstein; only accessible on waymarked footpaths; starting point: Rehberg car park on Trifelsstraße (Kreisstraße 2 Annweiler–Trifels), near climbers hut	View from Trifels Castle over Bindersbach to the Rehberg
Schindhübel (49.326786°N 7.875631°E)	571.0	Central; Palatine Forest	Frankenweide	Bad Dürkheim; roughly 3 km west of Iggelbach	Ridge; part of a ridge of hills that runs in an northeasterly direction from the Eschkopf to the Bloskülb; entirely covered in mixed woods (beech, oak, larch etc.); observation tower with panoramic view especially towards the east and south; accessible on a waymarked forest path; starting point: roughly 500 m from forest car park of „Mittelbuche“ on Kreisstraße 17 (Iggelbach–junction with the Bundesstraße 48)	Observation tower on the Schindhübel
Schlossberg (Schönau) (49.061227°N 7.786753°E)	570.9	Wasgau	Wasgauer; Felsenland	Südwestpfalz; roughly 2 km southwest of Nothweiler	Conical double peak with a relatively high prominence; Franco-German border running between the north and south tops; Wegelnburg castle on the north top, highest castle ruins in the Palatinate; all-round panoramic view; Hohenburg castle on the south top, also with all-round views; dense forest (mixed woods); rock formations (Middle Bunter sandstone); only accessible on waymarked footpaths from Nothweiler or Schönau; starting point: z. B. parking in Nothweiler or Schönau	View from the inner ward of the Wegelnburg
Drachenfels (49.423243°N 8.051605°E)	570.8	Central; Palatine Forest	Interior woodlands	Bad Dürkheim; 4 km north of Neidenfels	Upland hub of the forest regions between Hochspeyerbach and Isenach; trapezoidally-shaped hilltop; rock formations of Middle bunter sandstone ("Karlstal beds"); entirely wooded (beech, oak, pine etc.), nature reserve; former, unprominent, Roman circular rampart; panoramic view from the Südfels and Westfels rocks; 2 caves: the Drachenhöhle ("Dragon Cave") and Drachenkammer ("Dragon Lair"); only accessible on waymarked footpaths; Saupferch car park on Stichstraße from B 37 Frankenstein–Bad Dürkheim	The Drachenfels in winter
Bloskülb (49.340951°N 7.894943°E)	570.2	Central; Palatine Forest	Frankenweide	Bad Dürkheim; 2 km west of Iggelbach	Ridge; entirely wooded (beech, pine etc.); end of the ridge of hills, which runs northeast from the Eschkopf; accessible on a waymarked footpath; 500 m from Brandbuche car park on Kreisstraße 17 (Iggelbach–junction with the Bundesstraße 48)	
Großer Adelberg (49.216027°N 7.957277°E)	567.4	Central; Palatine Forest	Interior woodlands	Südliche Weinstraße; roughly 2 km north of Annweiler	Prominent hilltop; end of an elongated prominent ridge of hills, which runs from the Forsthaus Taubensuhl southwards; entirely covered in mixed forest; summit not accessible on tracks or footpaths; starting point: car parks in Annweiler	Kleiner and Großer Adelberg
Brogberg (49.33038°N 7.897239°E)	566.9	Central; Palatine Forest	Frankenweide	Bad Dürkheim; roughly 2 km west of Iggelbach	Elongated ridge; part of the ridge of hills, which runs from the Eschkopf to the Bloskülb; entirely wooded (mixed woods with relatively high proportion of deciduous trees); easily accessible on forest paths; starting point: woodland car parks of Mitteleiche or Brandbuche on Kreisstraße 17 (Iggelbach–junction with the Bundesstraße 48)	

== Abbreviations ==
Meanings of the abbreviations found in the table:

- NHN = Normalhöhennull i.e. the sea level datum used in Germany
- PWV = Palatine Forest Club (Palatine Forest Club)

== See also ==
List of mountains and hills of Rhineland-Palatinate

== Literature ==
- Michael Geiger et al.(ed.): Der Pfälzerwald, Porträt of a Landschaft. Verlag Pfälzische Landeskunde, Landau/Pf., 1987. ISBN 3980114716
- Michael Geiger et al. (ed.): Geographie der Pfalz. Verlag Pfälzische Landeskunde, Landau/Pf., 2010. ISBN 9783981297409
- Adolf Hanle: Meyers Naturführer, Pfälzerwald und Weinstraße. Bibliographisches Institut, Mannheim, 1990. pp. 7–12 ISBN 3411071311
- Karl Heinz: Pfalz: mit Weinstraße; Landschaft, Geschichte, Kultur, Kunst, Volkstum. Glock und Lutz Verlag, Heroldsberg, 1976. ASIN: B002GZ8RN
- Emil Heuser: Neuer Pfalzführer, 14th edn., (1st edn., 1900). Waldkirch-Verlag, Ludwigshafen, 1979. ASIN: B0043G3V6M
- Landesamt für Vermessung and Geobasisinformation Rheinland-Pfalz (publ.): 1:25.000 and 1:50.000 map series.Eigenverlag der Landesamtes für Vermessung und Geobasisinformation Rheinland-Pfalz, Koblenz, various years
