= Schindhübel =

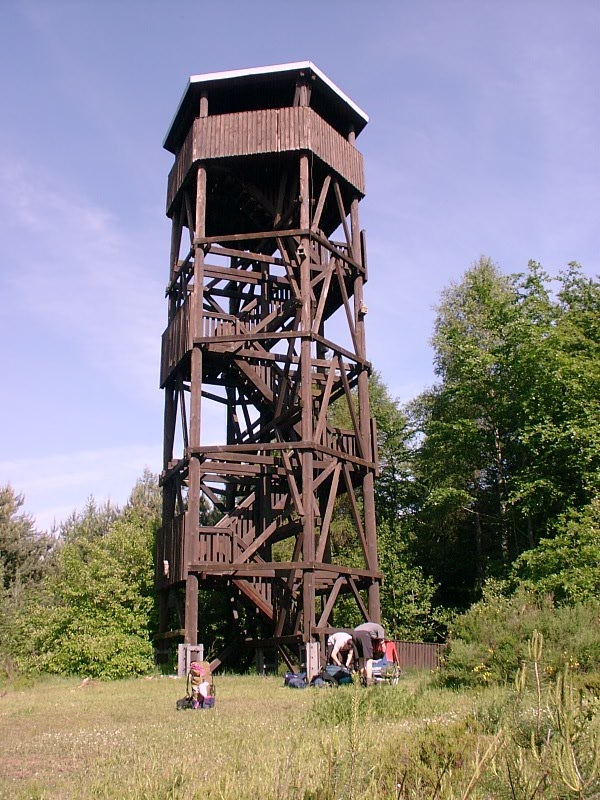
- Observation tower on the Schindhübel

Highest point
- Elevation: 571 m above sea level (NN) (1,873 ft)
- Coordinates: 49°19′23″N 7°52′31″E

Geography
- Location within Rhineland-Palatinate
- Location: Palatinate, Germany
- Parent range: Palatine Forest

The Schindhübel is a hill, 571 m above sea level (NN), that rises in the middle of the Palatine Forest in Germany, 5 km (3.1 mi) southwest of Elmstein.

== Geography ==
It is part of the central massif of this mountain range and also lies on the Palatine Watershed. This massif stretches roughly from Hochspeyer via Johanniskreuz to the B10 federal highway near Hauenstein. The region between Johanniskreuz and Hermersbergerhof is rather like a high plateau that is bounded by deeply incised valleys.

From the Eschkopf hill, the ridge runs northwest over the Schindhübel to the Bloskülb (570 m above NN) near the Elmstein village of Iggelbach. This ridge separates the upper tributaries of Speyerbach and Helmbach.

== Viewing tower ==
On top of the Schindhübel is a 17-metre-high observation tower, which was built in 1975 by an engineer unit from Speyer. From here there are views of the eastern Palatine Forest as far as the Haardt, as well as the striking mountain mass of the Donnersberg to the north and, in good visibility, the great Hornisgrinde mountain in the Northern Black Forest, 83 kilometres away to the south. To the west the view is limited by the nearby Eschkopf.

Two kilometres northwest, in the direction of the Bloskülb and Iggelbach, are the wall foundations of a forester's lodge which was allocated to the "Hunters from Electoral Palatinate" (Jäger aus Kurpfalz).
