= Mosisberg =

Hill in Rhineland-Palatinate, Germany

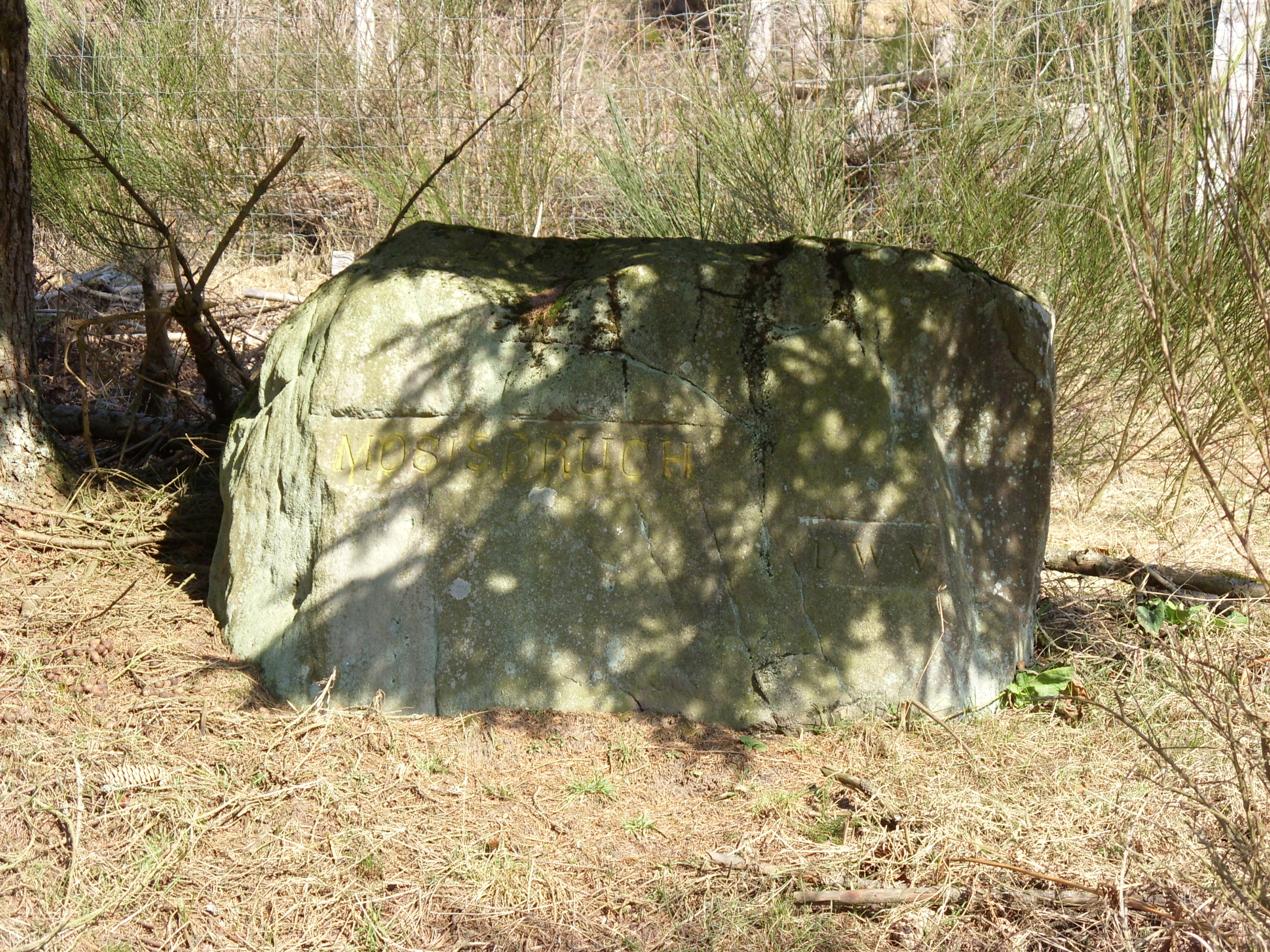
- Ritterstein 78 in the Mosisbruch hollow

Highest point
- Elevation: 608.7 m above sea level (NHN) (1,997 ft)
- Coordinates: 49°18′04″N 7°51′20″E

Geography
- Location within Rhineland-Palatinate
- Location: near Hofstätten; Südwestpfalz, Rhineland-Palatinate (Germany) (Part of the Palatine Watershed)
- Parent range: Frankenweide (Palatine Forest)

Geology
- Mountain type: Bunter sandstone

The Mosisberg near Hofstätten in the German state of Rhineland-Palatinate (Südwestpfalz county) is a hill, 608.7 m above sea level (NHN), in the central Palatine Forest. It has two domes, the eastern one is the summit and is called Langer Kopf and the western high point is the Preußenstein.

== Geography ==
=== Location ===
The hill lies on the territory of the hamlet of Hofstätten in the municipality of Wilgartswiesen and is part of the Frankenweide, which is a central massif within the mountain range. On the Langer Kopf there is a former US Air Force radio relay site.

=== Surrounding area ===
The Mosisberg is the second northernmost of a line of four peaks that exceed 600 m. To the north is the Eschkopf (608.3 m), to the south are the Hortenkopf (606.2 m) and the Weißenberg (ca. 610 m) The Palatine Watershed between the Moselle/Middle Rhine (west) and Upper Rhine (east) runs over the Eschkopf, Mosisberg and Hortenkopf.

In a high hollow about 700 metres southeast of the Mosisberg summit there was once a raised bog, the Mosisbruch, which was supplied by a two kilometre long brook that which shortly afterwards emptied from the right into the upper reaches of the Wellbach.

== Features ==
From the Mosisberg it is possible to walk to Leimen, Kaiserslautern-Mölschbach, Elmstein and via the forest lodges of Taubensuhl and Heldenstein almost as far as Neustadt on continuous ridges without dropping below the 450 metre contour.
