= Leimen =

Leimen is the name of:

- Leimen (Baden), in Baden-Württemberg
- Leimen, Rhineland-Palatinate, in Rhineland-Palatinate
