= Weißenberg (Frankenweide) =

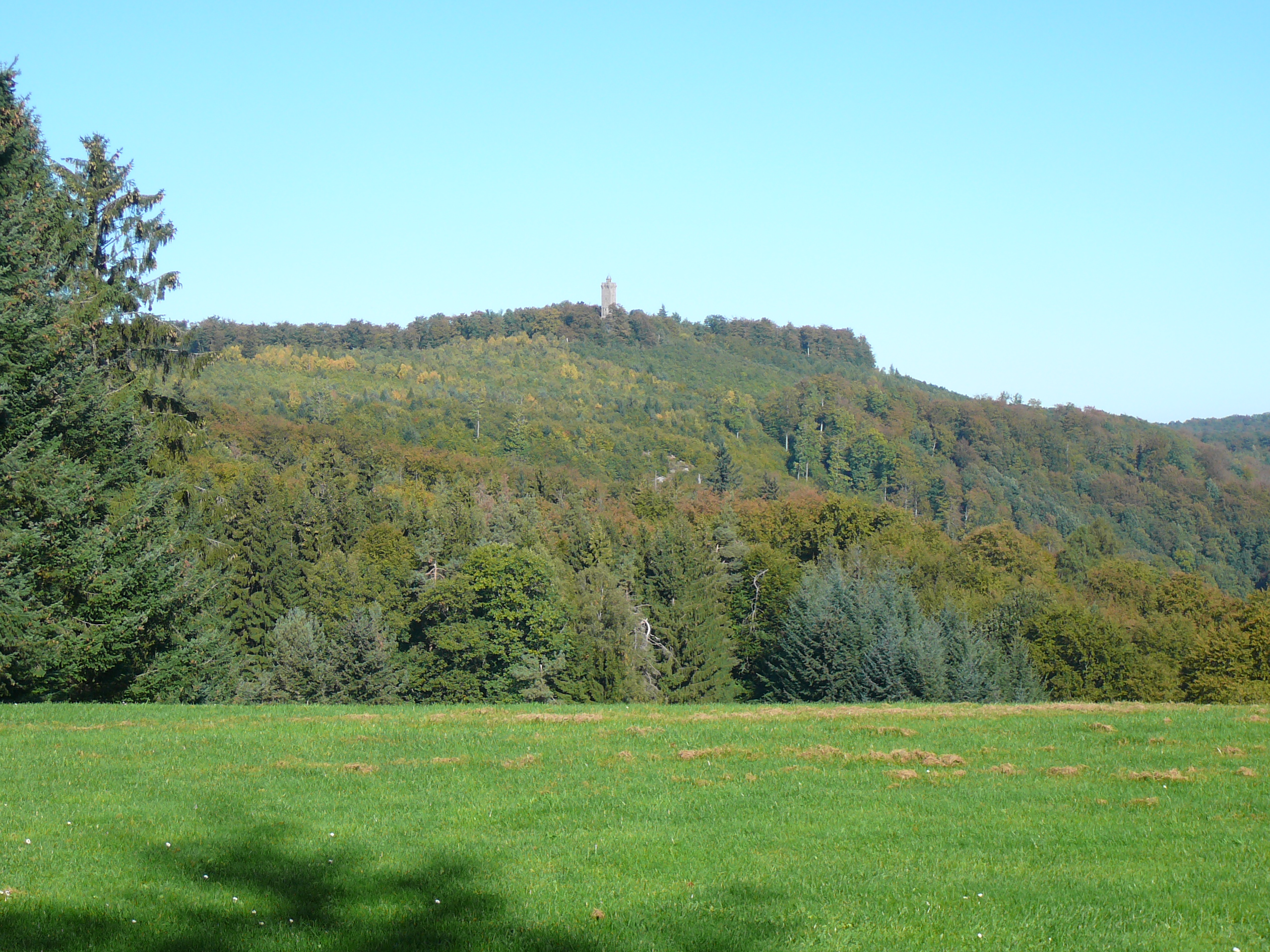
- View of the Weißenberg and Luitpold Tower from Hermersbergerhof

Highest point
- Elevation: 609.9 m above sea level (NHN) (2,001 ft)
- Prominence: 138 m ↓ Forsthaus Heldenstein (472 m above NHN)
- Isolation: 15 km → Roßberg (637 m above sea level (NHN)) or Steigerkopf (613 m above NHN)
- Coordinates: 49°15′09″N 7°49′32″E

Geography
- Location within Rhineland-Palatinate
- Location: Merzalben, Südwestpfalz, Rhineland-Palatinate (Germany)
- Parent range: Palatine Forest

Geology
- Rock age: 251–243 million years ago
- Mountain type: Rock unit: bunter sandstone

The Weißenberg in the Palatine Forest is a hill in the municipality of Merzalben (Südwestpfalz county, Rhineland-Pfalz). Its height is variously give as 610 m above sea level (NHN) or 607 m above NHN. The higher value has been officially recommended since 2011. That makes the Weißenberg the highest point in the west of the mountain range, ahead of the Eschkopf and Mosisberg (each 609 m above NHN). As part of the Palatine Forest-North Vosges Biosphere Reserve it is protected by special conservation measures.

== Geography ==
=== Location ===
The Weißenberg lies in the central Palatine Forest in the Palatine Forest Nature Park. It rises about 6.5 kilometres east-northeast of Merzalben and eight kilometres north of Hauenstein near the Wilgartswiesen hamlet of Hermersbergerhof. It does not have a single peak, but a saddle-shaped summit running in a north-south direction. The southern peak is 609.9 m high, and the northern peak, 280 metres away, is 609.1 m high.

The hill is part of the Frankenweide, a central massif in the Palatine Forest, and is the southernmost in a row of four summits, all above 600 m in height. To the north, in sequence, are the Hortenkopf (606 m), the Mosisberg and the Eschkopf (each 609 m).

== Isolation and prominence ==
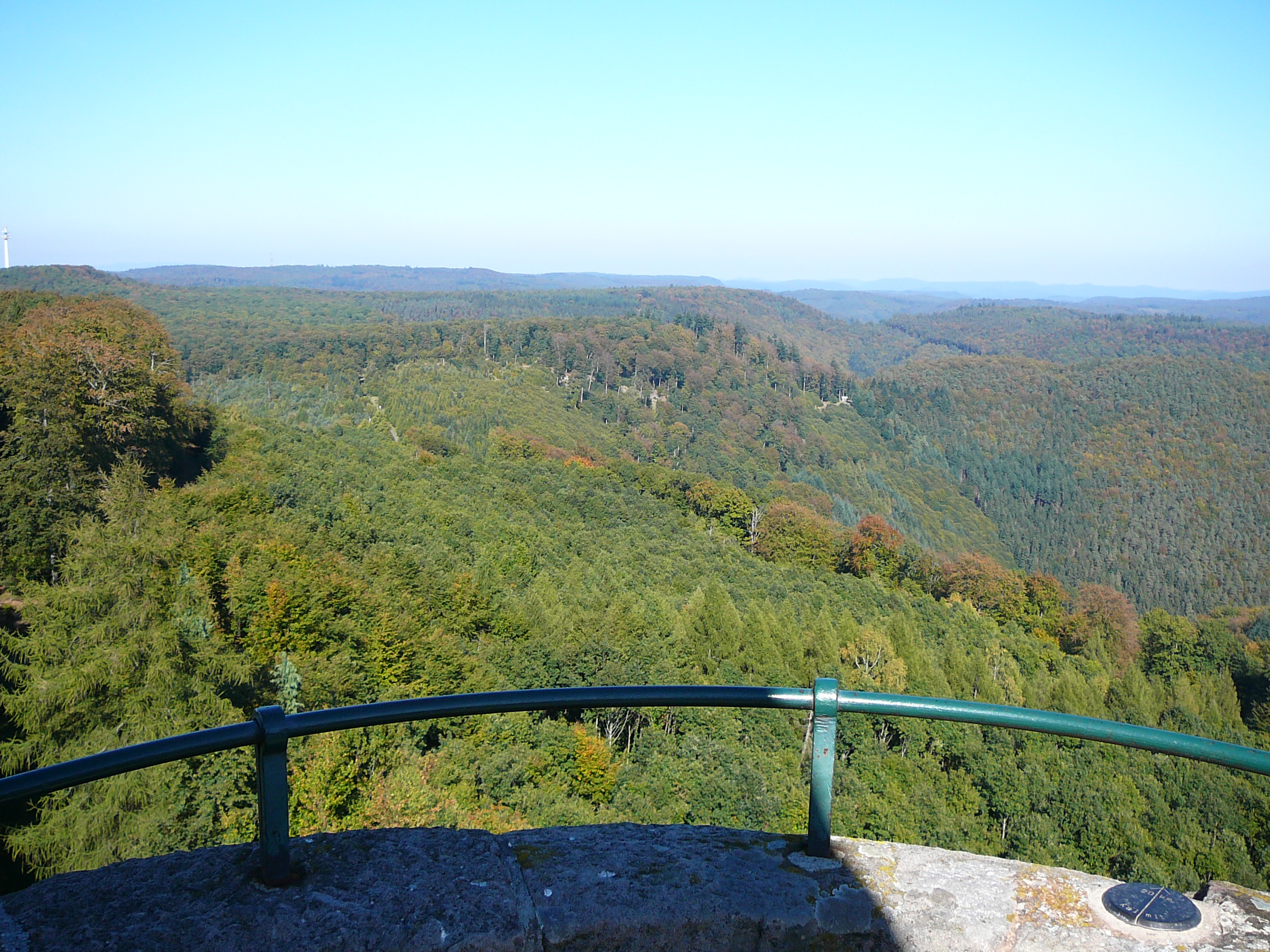
The Weißenberg is a hill with a relatively high isolation but low prominence: view from the Luitpold Tower looking north

The nearest peaks that are higher than the Weißenberg are the Roßberg (637 m) and the Steigerkopf (613 m) mountains; they are 15 kilometres away as the crow flies in the Haardt on the eastern edge of the Palatine Forest. Thus the Weißenberg has a relatively high isolation. In addition, the Weißenberg is not an isolated individual summit, but part of an elongated ridge that runs through the interior of the Palatine Forest in various directions and is a key feature of its relief.

If one draw a line of the greatest possible height (the ridgeline) to the next highest summit, this turns out to be the Steigerkopf at 613 m. The lowest point on this line is the saddle at Heldenstein Forestry Lodge at 472 m. The difference between the elevation of the Weißenberg summit and this saddle represents the prominence of the hill i.e. 138 m. This relatively low value is due to the morphological structure of the central Palatine Forest described above. For example, it is possible to walk from the Weißenberg to Leimen, Kaiserslautern-Mölschbach, Elmstein and via the forester's lodges of Taubensuhl and Heldenstein almost as far as the town of Neustadt on ridges without dropping below the 450 metre contour line.

== Literature ==
- Winfried Lang (2009), Herausragend im Pfälzerwald: Der Luitpoldturm und sein Panorama (in German), Annweiler: Plöger, ISBN 978-3-89857-254-5
- Kurt Reh (1990), "Luitpoldturm auf dem Weißenberg", in Adolf Hanle (ed.), Meyers Naturführer Pfälzerwald und Weinstraße (in German), Mannheim: Bibliographisches Institut, pp. 82–84, ISBN 3411071311
