= Totenkopf (disambiguation) =

In English, the totenkopf (German for skull) is a military symbol. (In German, it is simply the word for “skull and crossbones”.)

Totenkopf may also refer to:

- Totenkopf (High Tauern), a mountain in the Glockner Group of the High Tauern range in Austria
- Totenkopf (hill), the highest point in the Kaiserstuhl region, Baden-Württemberg, Germany
- Totenkopf (Sauerland), a hill in the Sauerland, North Rhine-Westphalia
- Totenkopf (Palatine Forest), a hill saddle in the Palatine Forest, Rhineland-Palatinate, Germany
- Totenkopf (Hainich), a hill of Thuringia, Germany

== See also ==
- SS-Totenkopfverbände
- 3rd SS Panzer Division Totenkopf
