= Frankenweide =

Hill in Rhineland-Palatinate, Germany

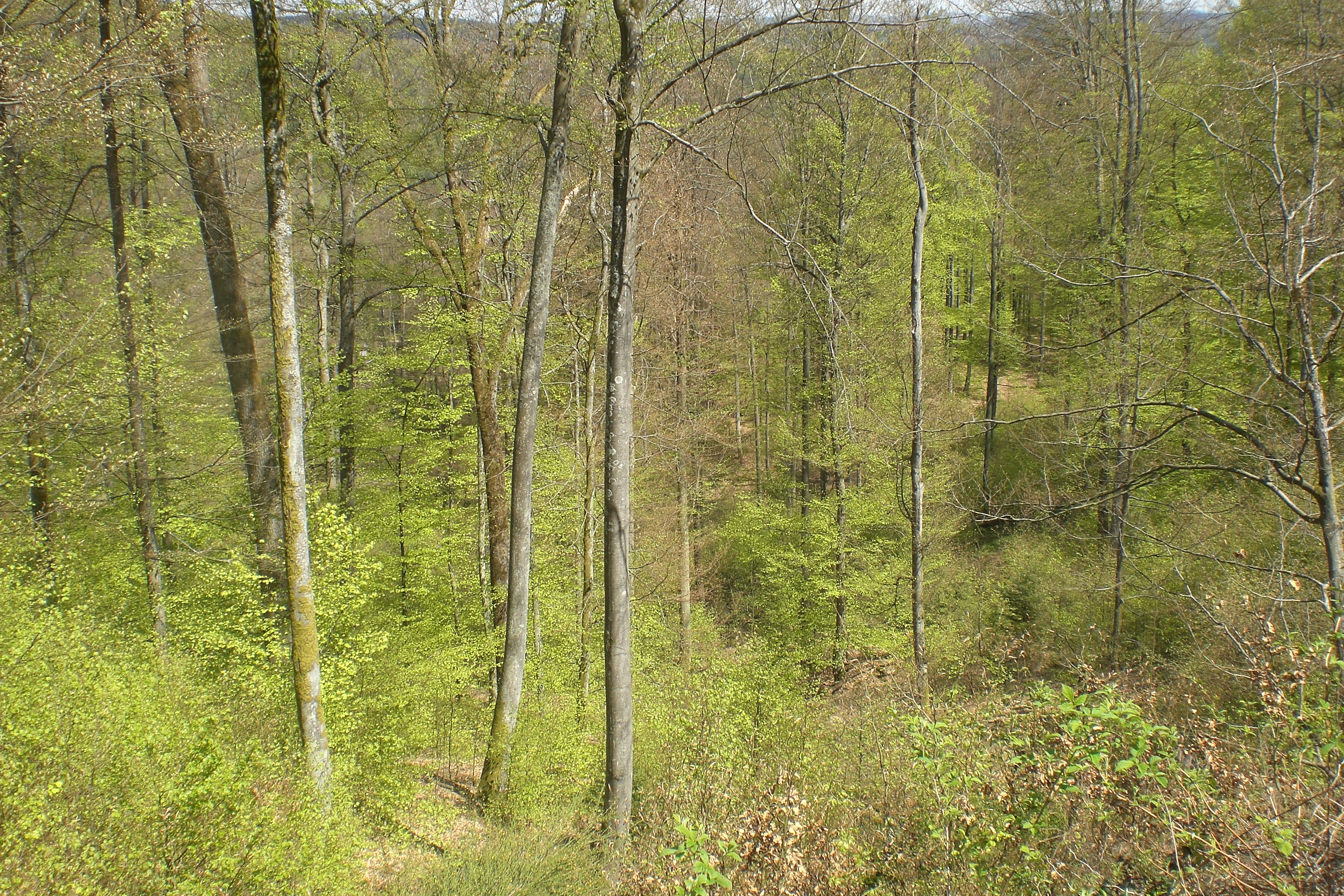
The wooded countryside of the Frankenweide in spring

The Frankenweide is a hill region in the German state of Rhineland-Palatinate. It forms the central part of the Palatine Forest in the Palatinate region.

== Geography ==
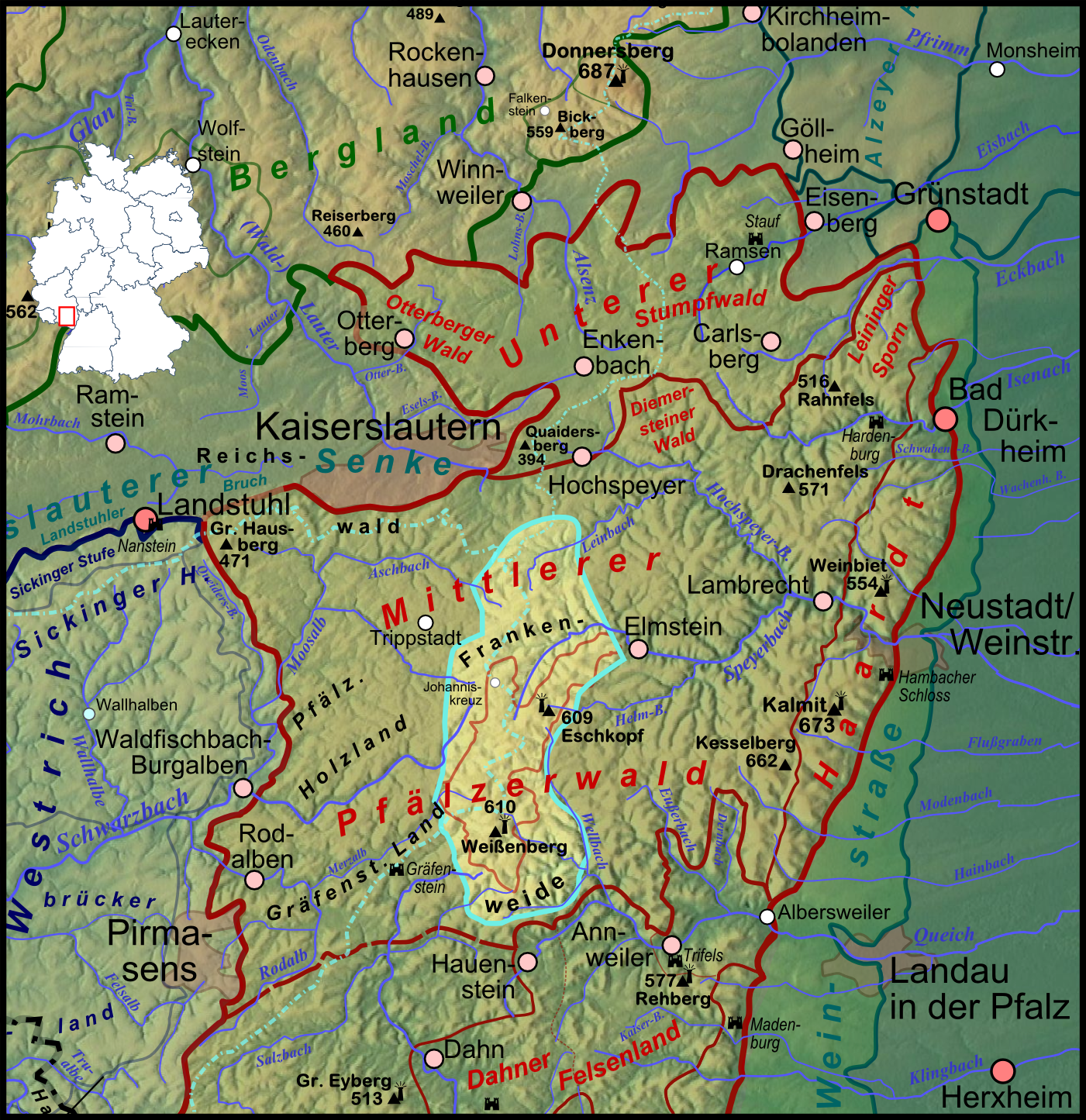
Location of the Frankenweide (orange) within the Palatine Forest

The Frankenweide is a single forest that, today, covers an area of a good 200 square kilometres (77 sq mi). Much of it is a plateau at an elevation of about 380–450 m above sea level (NN), which climbs steadily from north to south. Individual hill summits rise prominently from the plateau, which is framed by deeply incised valleys. In the south the Frankenweide is bounded by the valley of the Queich, in the east by the Wellbach stream and its northern projection. There it is adjoined by imperial forest, the Rhineland-Palatinate Reichswald of Kaiserslautern. In the northwest the Moosalb stream forms the border, and in the southwest, it is bounded by Gräfenstein Land. From north to south the region is divided into Lower Frankenweide (Untere Frankenweide) with its municipality of Waldleiningen, Middle Frankenweide (Mittlere Frankenweide) and Eschkopf, and Upper Frankenweide (Obere Frankenweide) around the hamlet of Hermersbergerhof which is part of the municipality of Wilgartswiesen.

The highest points of the area lie in the Middle and Upper Frankenweide, along which the watershed between the Upper Rhine and the Middle Rhine (or Moselle) runs. These high points are the Eschkopf and the Mosisberg, each 609 metres (1,998 ft) high, the Hortenkopf at 606 metres (1,988 ft) and the Weißenberg at (610 metres (2,000 ft). In a high hollow southeast of the Mosisberg summit there was once a raised bog, the Mosisbruch, which was fed by a two-kilometre-long (1.2 mi) stream that emptied into the upper Wellbach shortly thereafter. At the Hortenkopf the watershed turns towards the southwest, heading in the direction of Gräfenstein Castle, hence the Weißenberg is no longer on the watershed.

== History ==
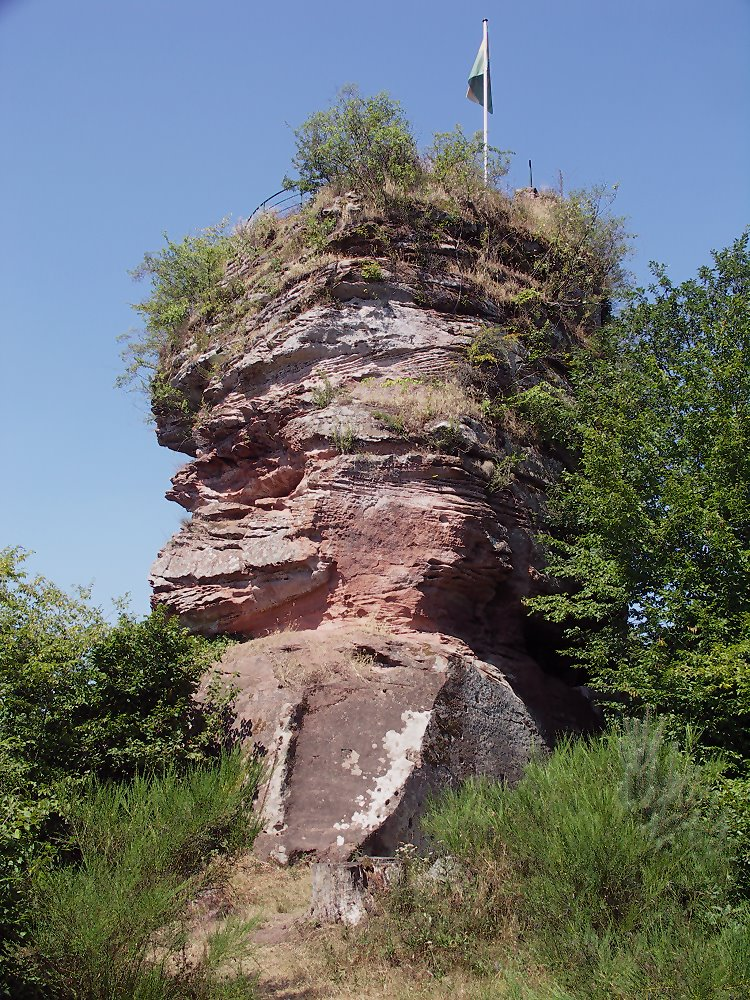
The ruins of the Falkenburg

The name Frankenweide ("Frankish pasture") emerged, as it suggests, in the Frankish period, at the latest in the 6th century. At that time the woods were completely unsettled and were partly used for the grazing of animals, mainly domestic pigs and goats. When the presumably Frankish counts of Leiningen were first mentioned in the 12th century, they were responsible for the management of the Frankenweide. In the 13th century, the knight, John of Wilenstein, after whom the hamlet of Johanniskreuz is named, was the instigator of several feuds.

Although the House of Wittelsbach from Palatinate-Zweibrücken also had estates and titles in the Frankenweide for a time, the Leiningen head office (Oberamt) at the castle of Falkenburg near Wilgartswiesen remained administratively responsible until France conquered the Electoral Palatine territories west of the Rhine after the French Revolution in the 1790s and annexed them in 1801. Shortly beforehand, in 1785, the Frankenweide as a whole had transferred formally to the County of Leiningen.

During its history, the Frankenweide repeatedly lost land, in total about 100 km². In the east in the 12th century the Elmstein Forest around the upper Speyerbach valley was partitioned off. In 1304 King Albert of Habsburg granted the large area in the southeast - which lay between the valleys of the Wellbach and Eußerbach from the forester's lodge, Forsthaus Taubensuhl, in the north to the Queich valley in the south - to the imperial city of Annweiler; today the area is called the Annweiler Municipal Forest (Annweiler Bürgerwald). In 1602 the Esthal Forest in the northeast was given to the fief of Erfenstein.

The present region of Frankenweide belongs mainly to the counties of Kaiserslautern und Südwestpfalz.

== Economy and Infrastructure ==
=== Settlement ===
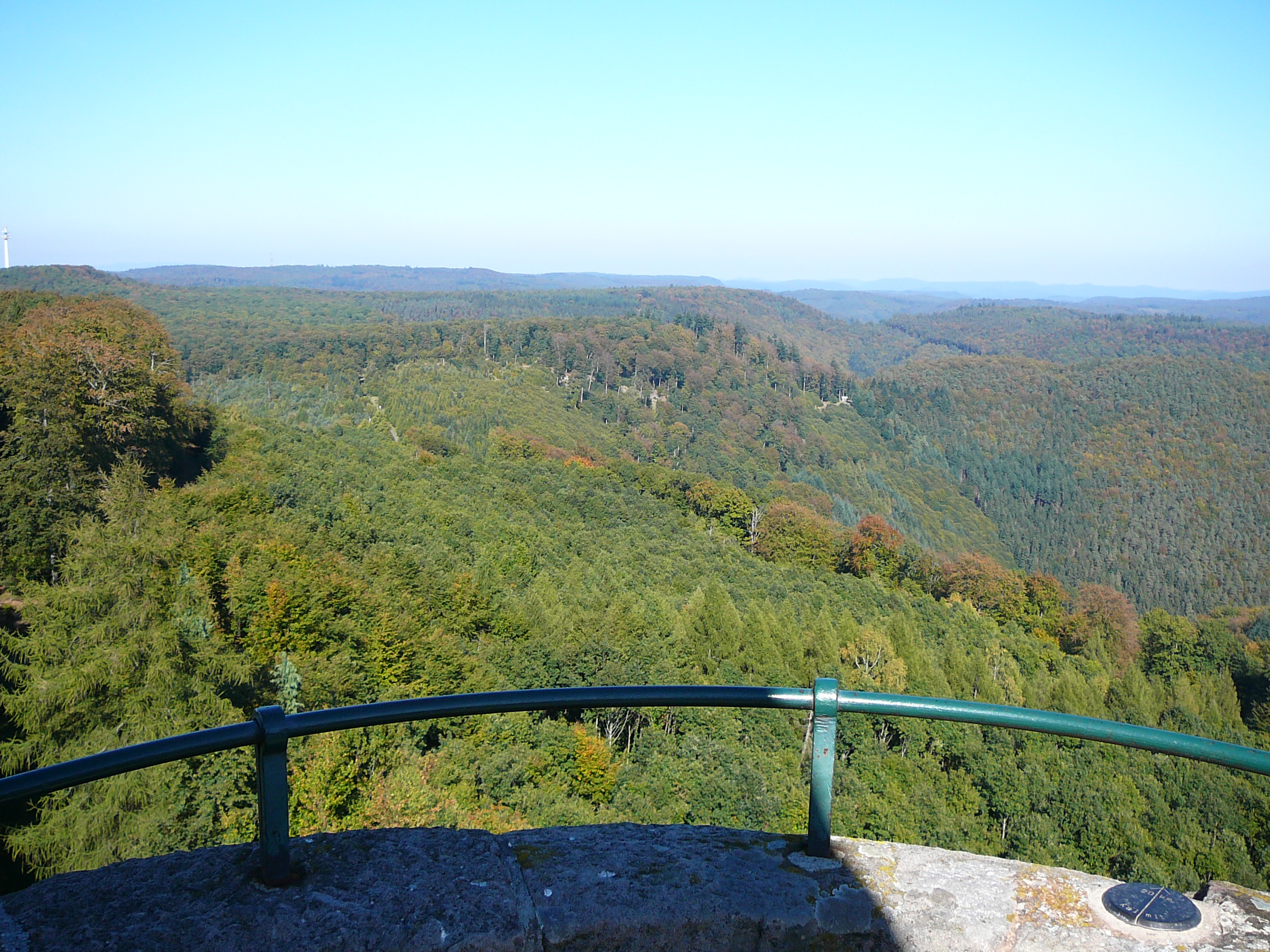
The Upper Frankenweide: view from the Luitpold Tower of the Weißenberg to the north

When, in the 9th century, the Palatine, which still belonged to Middle Francia, opened more and more monasteries, the edge of the Palatinate Forest gradually became increasingly settled. This did not affect the Frankenweide, however, which lay in the heart of the mountains. For a long time the only outpost of civilization was Hermersbergerhof founded by Hornbach Abbey and mentioned as early as 828 A.D. Over the centuries, foresters' lodges and charcoal burners' cottages were built here and there, and the foresters' base of Hofstätten was built by the Leiningen authorities and mentioned first in 1379. Excavations at Mosisbruch near the Wellbach valley showed that a settlement must have existed here too from the 11th to the 14th century. But the authorities in Wilgartswiesen, whose territory today include large parts of the Frankenweide, was too far away to be able to successfully plan and development the area. As a result of the Thirty Years' War even the few populated places were abandoned in the first half of the 17th century and it was not until around 1785 that the foresters' village of Waldleiningen was laid out at the instigation of Prince Carl Frederick William of Leiningen-Hardenburg, which remained the only independent municipality in the Frankenweide. Today less than a thousand people live in this remote region.

=== Transport ===
With its central communication hub at Johanniskreuz, Frankenweide was a transit route between the Upper Rhine Valley and what is now Lorraine from the earliest times. At that time, when roads followed the ridges wherever possible, ways branched off the main route towards the monasteries of Wissembourg Abbey and Hornbach as well as the Imperial Palace at Kaiserslautern. The northern route of the Palatine Way of St. James crossed the northern part of the Frankenweide.

Today footpaths and roads often follow the courses of the old ways. However, the Frankenweide is no longer mainly approached in an east-west direction, but on the winding B 48, which climbs up from the B 10 federal highway to the south through the Wellbach valley to Johanniskreuz, the only settlement on the whole route, and then runs on to join the B 37 near Hochspeyer to the north.

=== Leisure and tourism ===
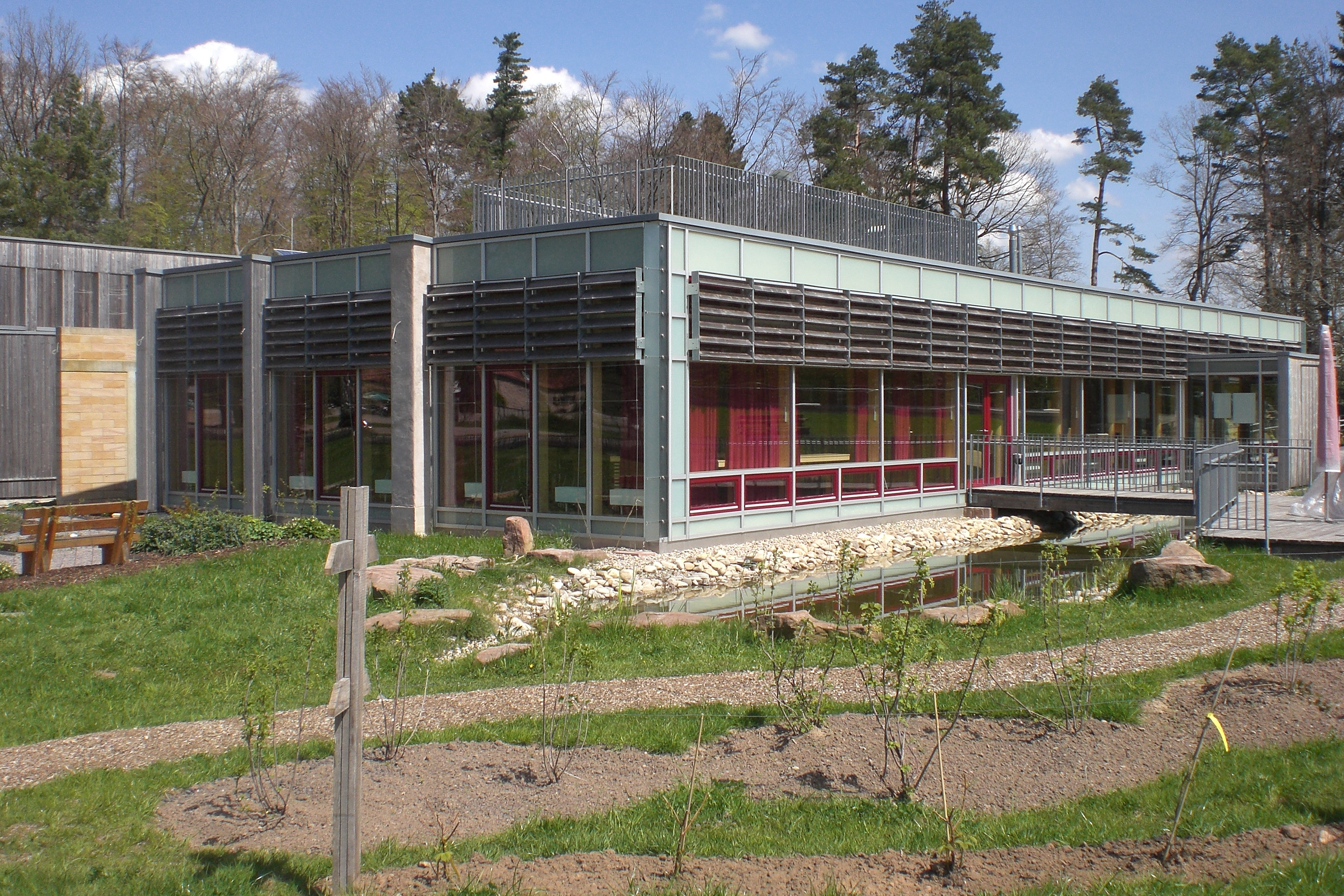
House of Sustainability

The plateau with its extensive forests is a destination for hikers. All Palatinate Forest Club long distance paths marked with a cross and that radiate across the entire Palatinate, meet at Johanniskreuz in the heart of the Frankenweide. There are viewing towers on the Weißenberg and the Eschkopf. For mountain bikers there are courses at the Palatine Forest Mountain Bike Park and in the neighbouring region of Holzland.

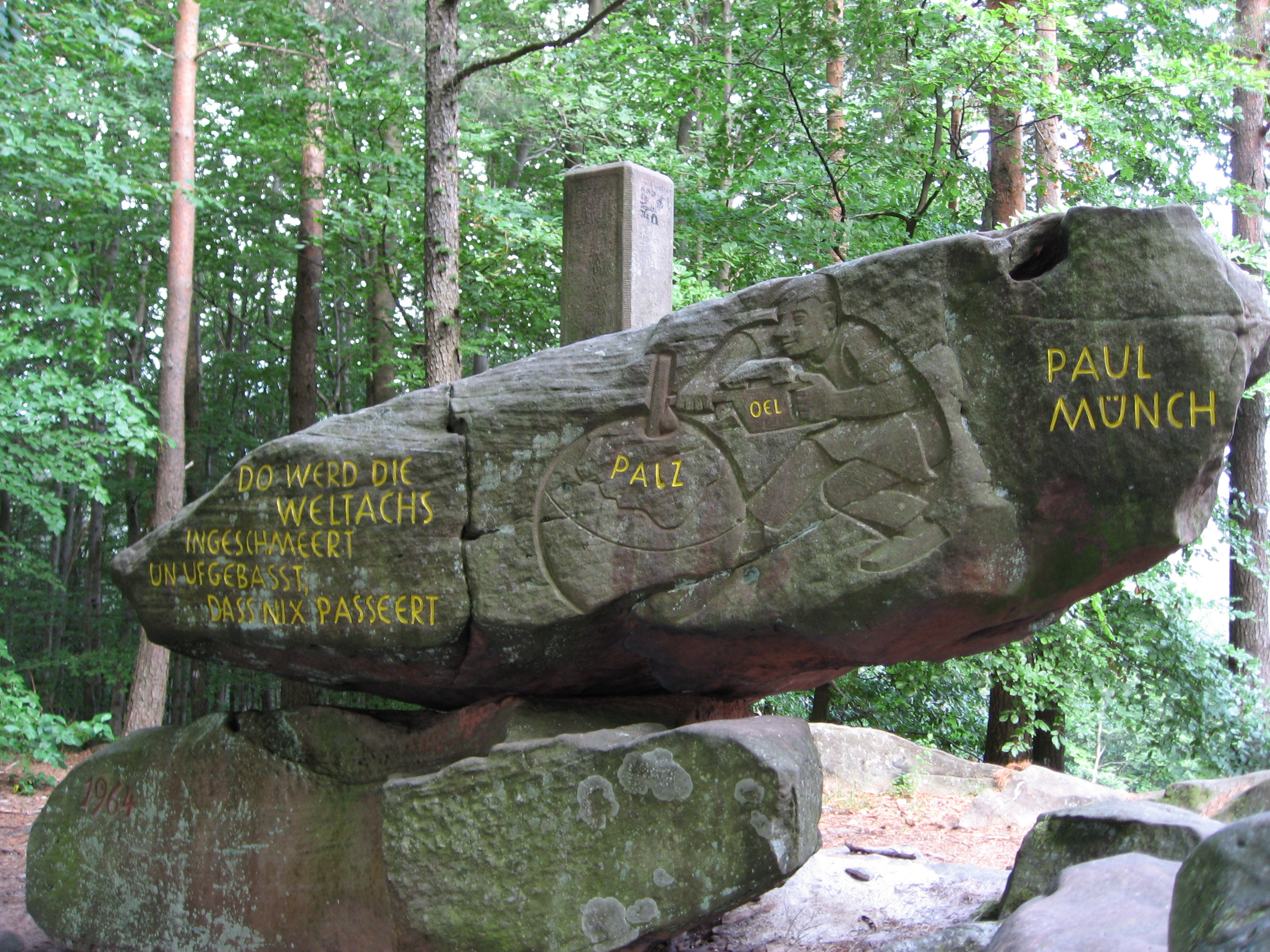
"Palatine World Axis" on the Roßrück near Waldleiningen

Johanniskreuz, with its House of Sustainability and a few other houses, mainly hotels and restaurants, is the touristic centre of the Frankenweide. The Palatine Catholics Day and woodland services take place here and, on Sundays, especially in good weather, hundreds of bikers meet here. On the Hermersbergerhof, whose six-kilometre-long approach road between Wilgartswiesen and Hauenstein branches off the B 10 abzweigt and then continues as a narrow lane for ten kilometres to the Landstraße from Leimen to Johanniskreuz, is used for winter sports in good snow conditions; but due to the increasingly mild winters the skilift was dismantled in the 1990s. A toboggan run still exists, however.

One tourist attraction is the landmark built in the 1860s on the 459-metre-high Roßrück near Waldleiningen by the Kingdom of Bavaria which became known locally as the Palatine World Axis (Pälzer Weltachs). It became the subject of local poet, Paul Münch, in his well-known Palatine poem. In 1964 a passage from his poem was inscribed on a nearby rock.

== Literature ==
- August Becker (1975), Die Pfalz und die Pfälzer (in German) (7th ed.), Landau/Pfalz: Pfälzische Verlagsanstalt, ISBN 3898571939
- Karl Heinz (1976), Pfalz mit Weinstraße: Landschaft, Geschichte, Kultur, Kunst, Volkstum (in German), Heroldsberg: Glock und Lutz Verlag, ASIN B01KOIENVO
- Emil Heuser (1979), Neuer Pfalzführer (in German) (14th ed.), Ludwigshafen/Rhein: Waldkirch Verlag, ASIN B01KOIENVO
- Heinz Wittner (1981), Großer Pfalzführer (in German), Ostfildern: Deutscher Wanderverlag Dr. Mair & Schnabel & Co, ISBN 3813401065
