= Hortenkopf =

Hill in Rhineland-Palatinate, Germany

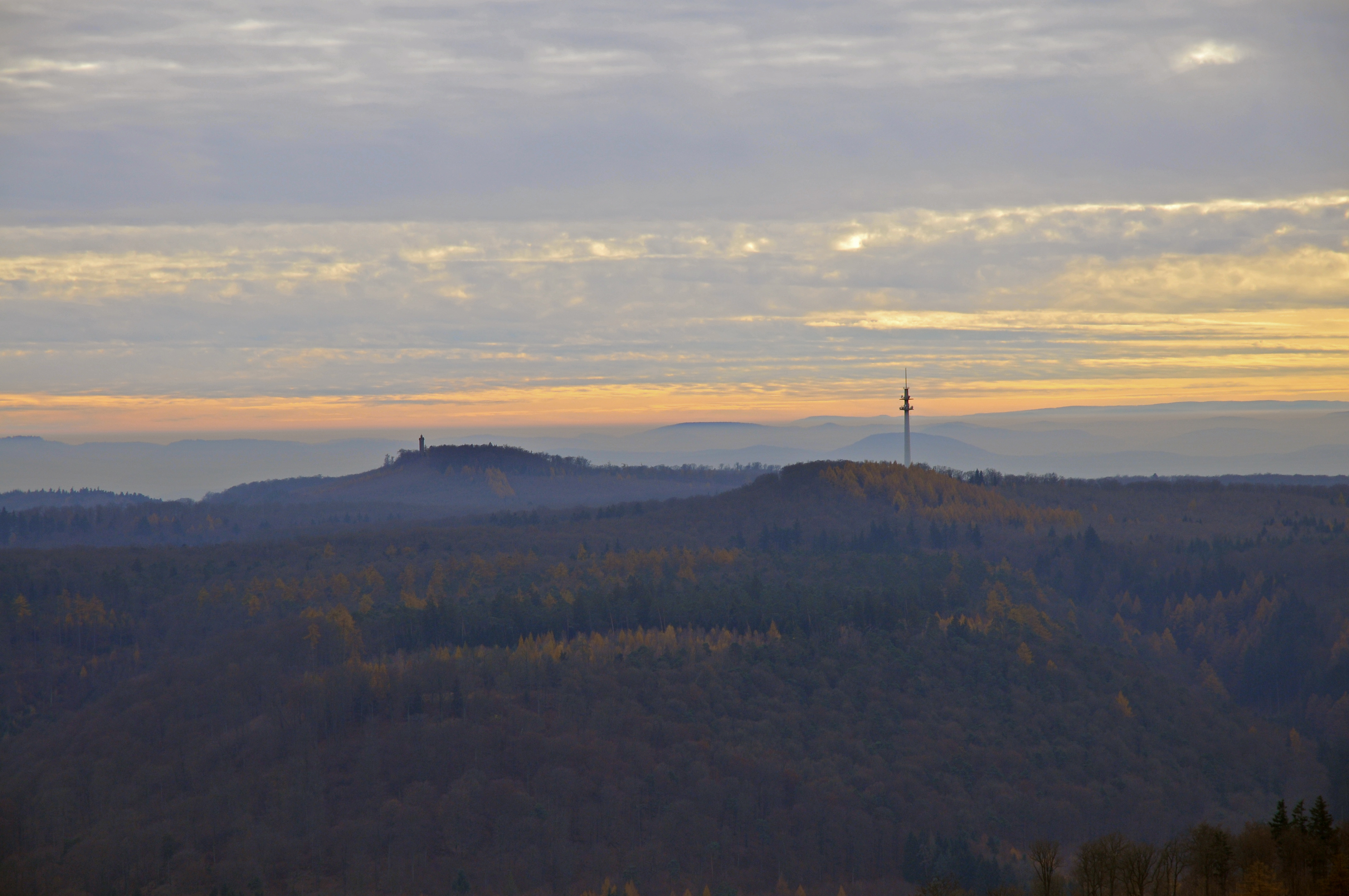
- The Hortenkopf (right, with transmission tower) and the Weißenberg (behind left, with the Luitpold Tower)

Highest point
- Elevation: 606 m above sea level (NN) (1,988 ft)
- Coordinates: 49°16′13″N 7°49′39″E

Geography
- Location within Rhineland-Palatinate
- Location: Rhineland-Palatinate (Germany)
- Parent range: Palatine Forest

Geology
- Mountain type: Bunter sandstone

The Hortenkopf is a hill, 606 metres above sea level (NN), in the German state of Rhineland-Palatinate, which lies in the middle of the Palatine Forest between Hofstätten and Leimen. The Hortenkopf is recognisable from a long way off thanks to the transmission tower that has been erected on its summit.

== Geography and access ==
The hill is part of the Frankenweide, a centrally located massif within this range of low mountains. The Palatine Watershed runs over its summit. The Hortenkopf is the second southernmost of a row of four peaks that reach a height of over 600 metres. To the south is the Weißenberg (610 m) near the hamlet of Hermersbergerhof in the municipality of Wilgartswiesen. To the north are the Mosisberg and the Eschkopf (jeweils 609 m). From the Hortenkopf it is possible to walk to Leimen, Kaiserslautern-Mölschbach, Elmstein and via the forest lodges of Taubensuhl and Heldenstein almost as far as Neustadt on continuous hill ridges without dropping below the 450 metre contour line.

At the Hortenkopf the main watershed turns southwest towards Gräfenstein Castle. On the southwestern flank of the Hortenkopf rises the northern headstream of the Wieslauter, which - subsequently as the Lauter – flows directly into the River Rhine. Further northwest rises a tributary of the Merzalbe, whose waters flow via the Rodalb, Schwarzbach, Blies, Saar and Moselle into the Rhine.
