= Roßberg (Haardt) =

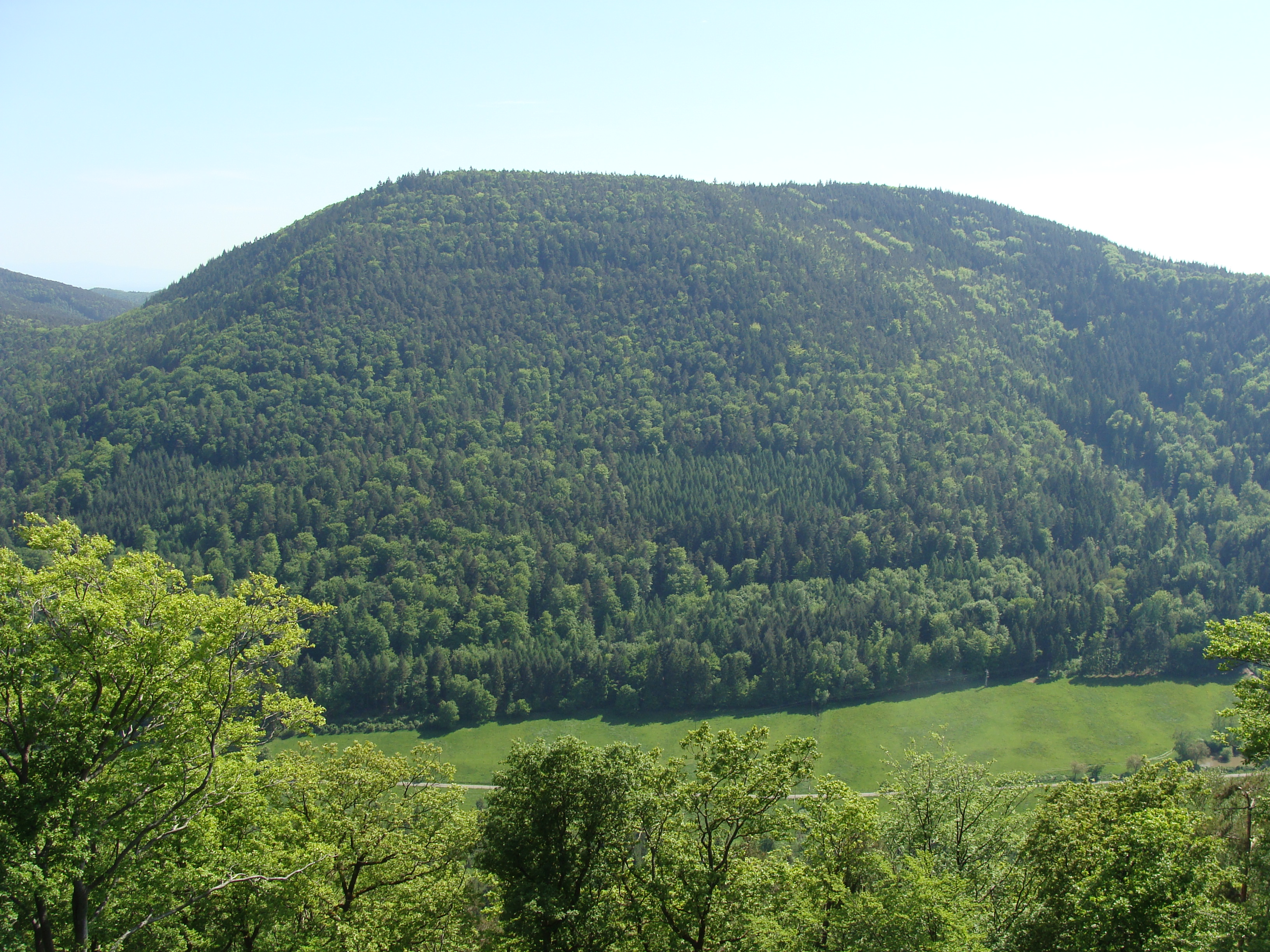
- The Roßberg seen from the Frankenfelsen rocks

Highest point
- Elevation: 637 m above sea level (NHN) (2,089.9 ft)
- Coordinates: 49°15′46″N 8°01′50″E

Geography
- Location within Rhineland-Palatinate
- Location: near Ramberg; Südliche Weinstraße, Rhineland-Palatinate (Germany)
- Parent range: Haardt, Palatine Forest

The Roßberg near Ramberg in the county of Südliche Weinstraße in the German state of Rhineland-Palatinate is, at 637 m above sea level (NHN), the third highest mountain in the Palatine Forest.

The Roßberg lies in the Haardt, the eastern mountain range of the Palatine Forest in the Palatine Forest Nature Park. Its summit rises 1.5 km east of the municipality of Ramberg on the territory of the village of Burrweiler, 3.7 km to the southeast. The Ziegelbach stream, a right tributary of the Modenbach, rises on the eastern side of the mountain.

The Roßberg is entirely forested. There is no clearing at the top that enables views of the surrounding countryside. From the south the summit may be reached on a forest track. Another approach from the east is overgrown in places.

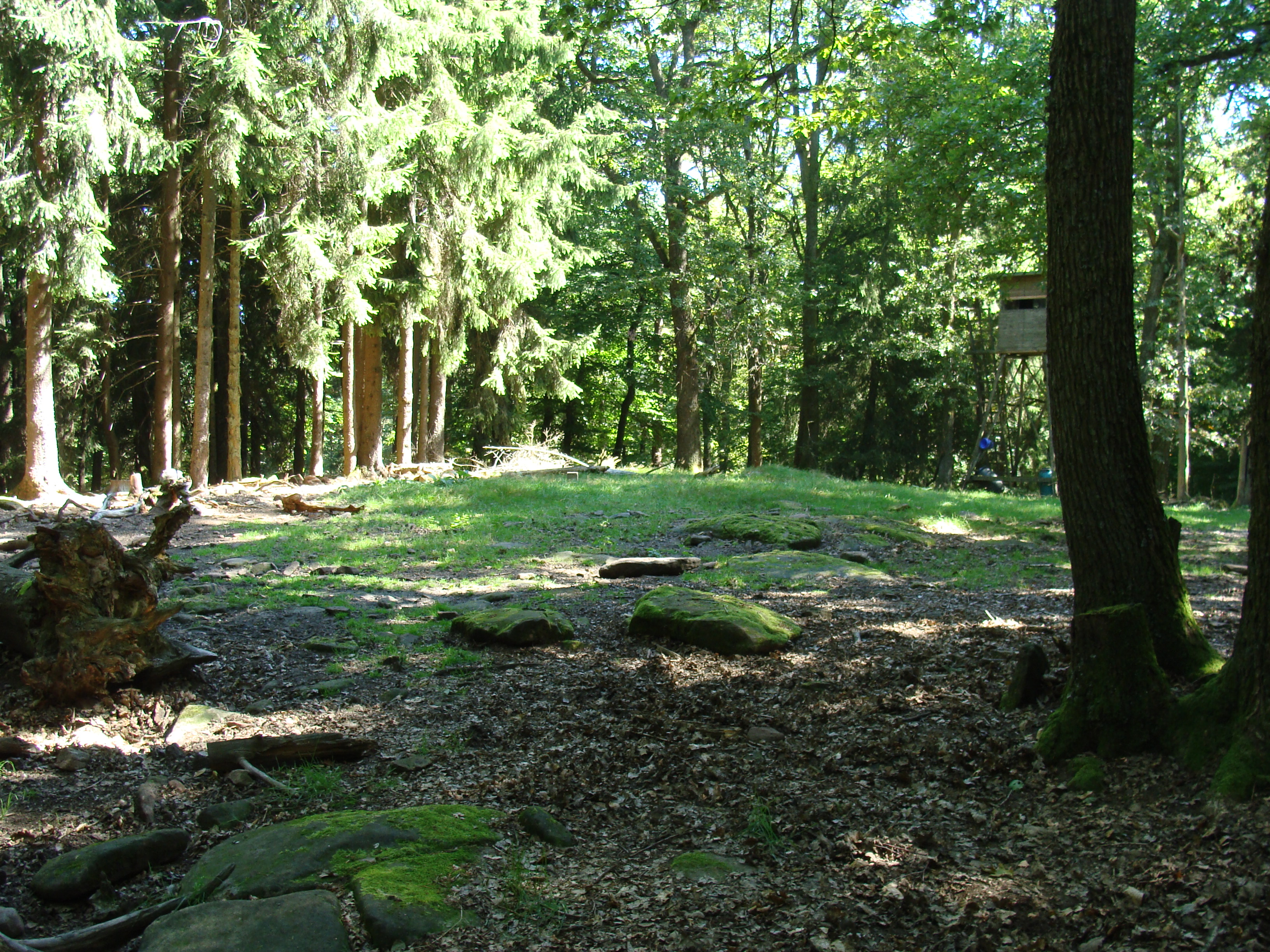
Summit of the Roßberg
