= Palatine Watershed =

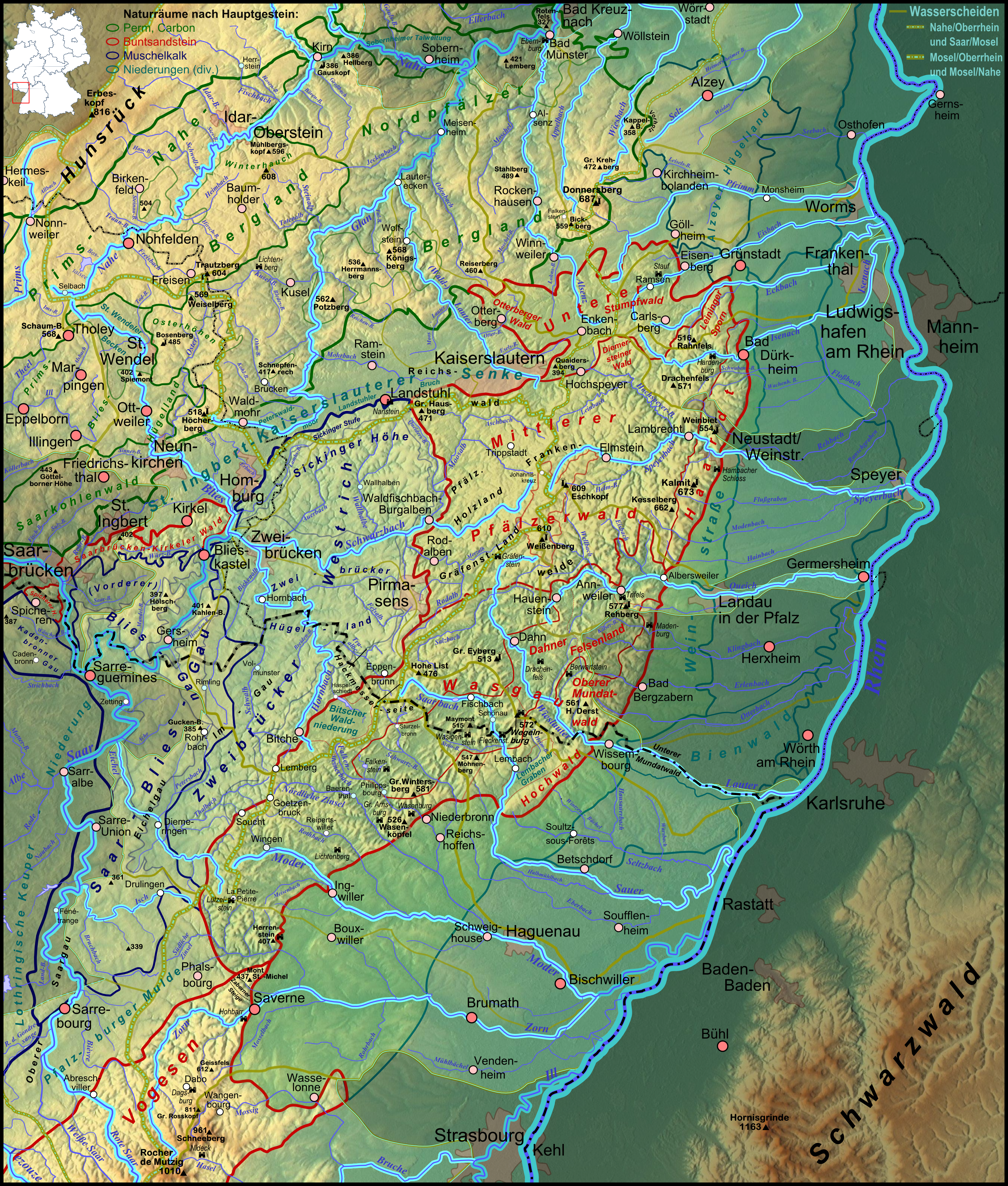
(Main) rivers and streams on both sides of the Palatine Watershed. The most frequently used course has the widest marking.

The Palatine Watershed (German: Pfälzische Hauptwasserscheide) forms the main drainage divide in the Palatinate between the Upper Rhine and the Middle Rhine, the two successive sections of the river Rhine that flow through the German state of Rhineland-Palatinate.

In the southern and central Palatine Forest the effect of the Palatine Watershed is especially clear. There it separates the catchment areas of its four major drainage systems into an eastern and a western region: The Lauter, referred to in its upper reaches as the Wieslauter, the Queich and the Speyerbach flow eastwards, directly into the Upper Rhine; the Schwarzbach collects the water from the western Palatine Forest and sends it via the Blies, Saar and Moselle rivers to the Middle Rhine.

== Course ==
=== South and central area ===
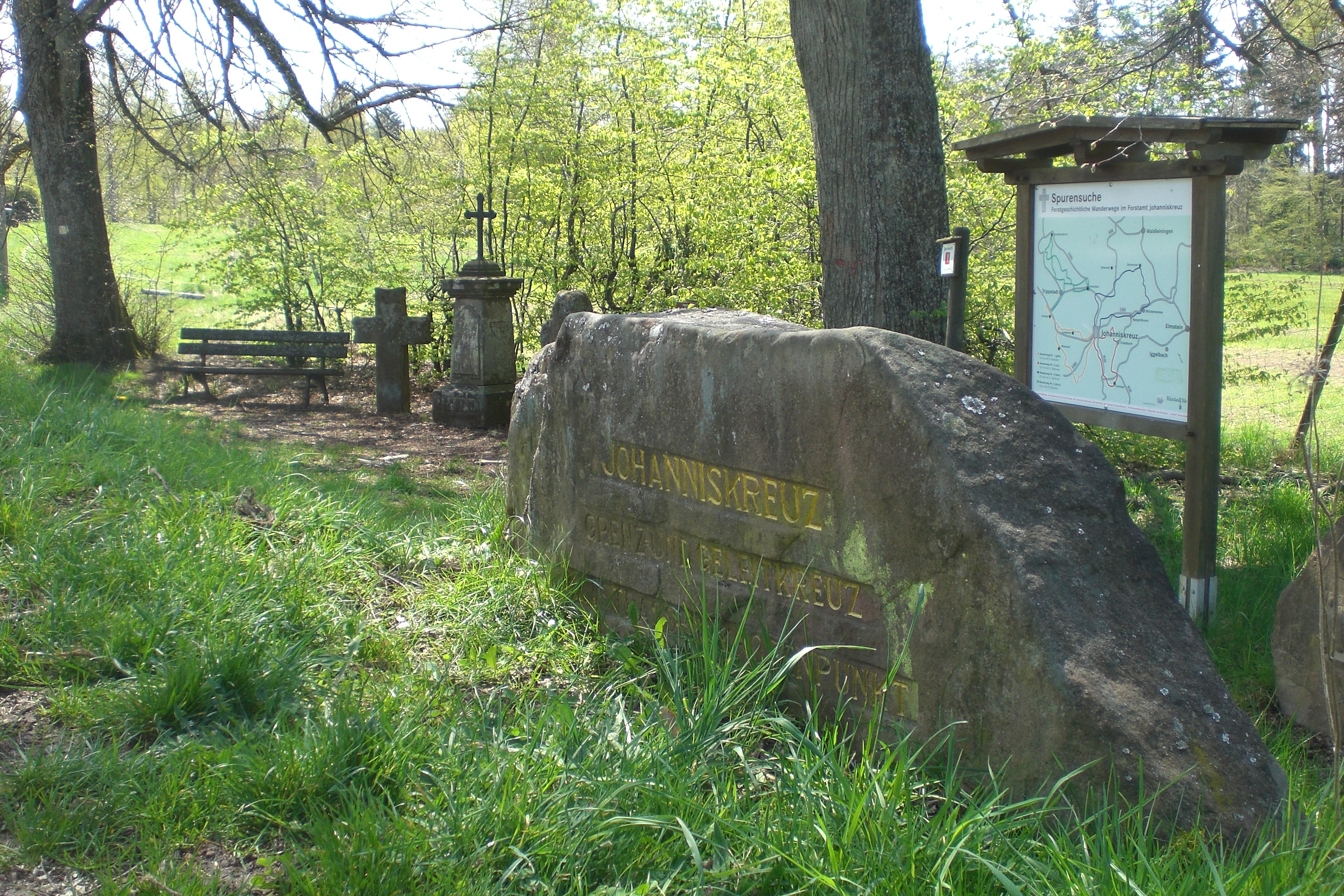
On the main watershed: the Johanniskreuz and Ritterstein No. 111

In the southern Palatine Forest, the German part of the Wasgau, the Palatine Watershed begins on the French border in the area of the Erlenkopf hill (473 m above NHN), where it is a continuation of the watershed in the northern Vosges. Always generally running from southwest to northeast it initially heads eastwards past Eppenbrunn and Pirmasens over the Großer Schiffelskopf (457 m) and reaches the region of Gräfenstein Land. From there it runs up the Hortenkopf (606 m) in the central Frankenweide. Several kilometres it passes through the hamlet of Johanniskreuz (470 m), one of the highest settlements in the Palatine Forest. The watershed then reaches the area west of Waldleiningen in the Lower Frankenweide.

=== Northern area ===
There are two options for the northern course of the Palatine Watershed, depending on whether the confluence of the Nahe at Bingen is counted as part of the Upper Rhine or is seen as belonging to the Middle Rhine. If the former is assumed, it runs south of the catchment area of the Nahe; if the latter, it runs to the east of it.

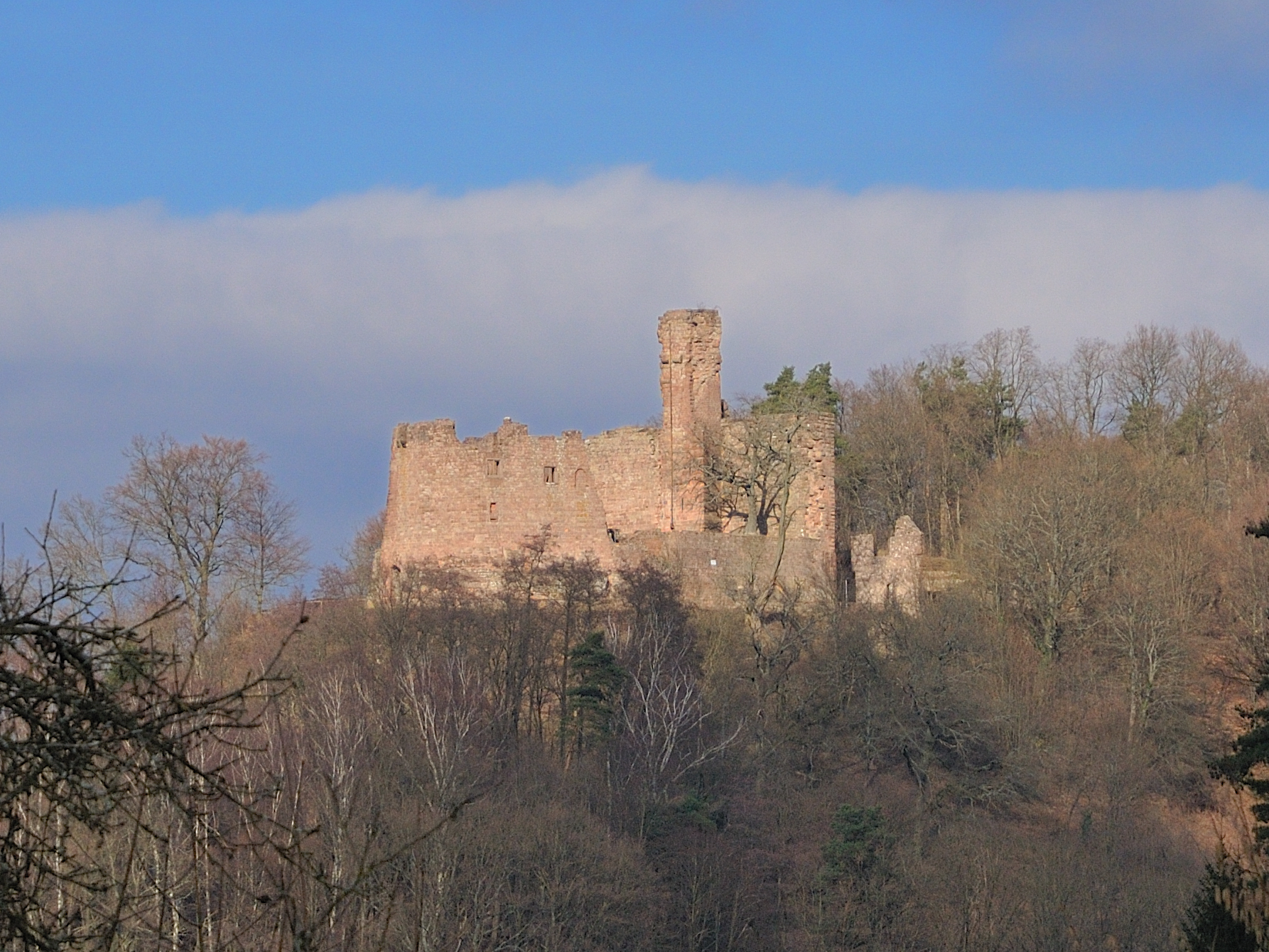
South of Kaiserslautern the western branch of the watershed runs below the Hohenecken Castle.

In the first, more usually accepted case, the watershed is identical with that of the Schwarzbach and its headstreams (especially the Moosalb, Rodalb, Wallhalb and Hornbach) with the Nahe tributary of the Glan. The drainage divide runs from the Lower Frankenweide westwards through the Imperial Forest (the Reichswald) past the Großer Humberg (430 m) in the area of the Großer Hausberg (471 m) between Kaiserslautern and Landstuhl. On the Sickingen Heights it runs close to its northern edge to the Saarland border at Homburg.

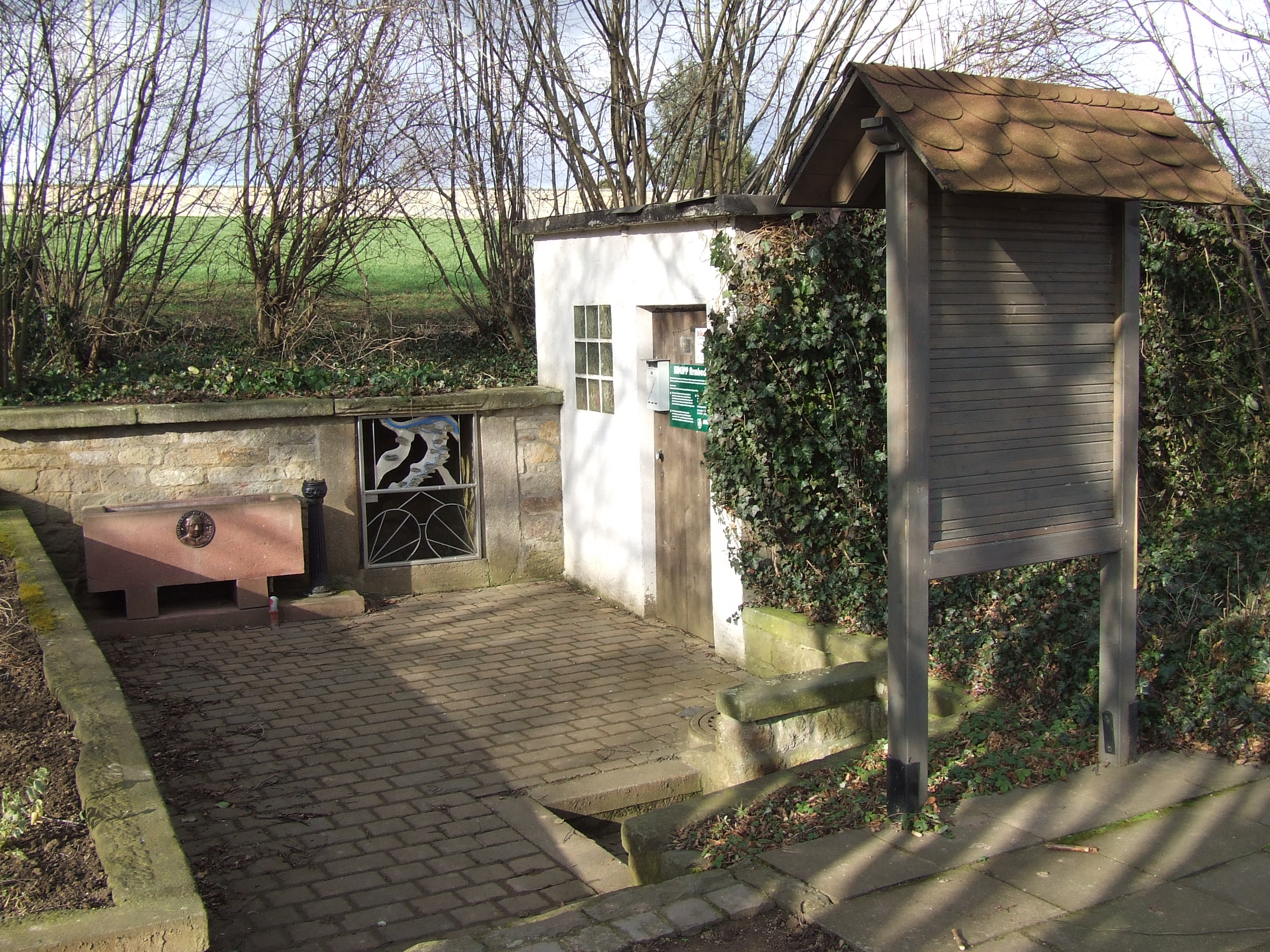
Source of the Selz in Orbis immediately east of the northern branch of the watershed

In the more rarely postulated second case, the watershed runs from the Lower Frankenweide onwards in a northeasterly, later more northerly direction. In doing so, it separates the catchment area of the Nahe in the west, to which the Lauter (locally Waldlauter), Alsenz and Appelbach belong, from the sources of the smaller, west Upper Rhine tributaries, namely the Isenach, Eckbach, Eisbach and Pfrimm. From the forest of Stumpfwald in the northern Palatine Forest the watershed enters the North Palatine Uplands, passing immediately west of the summit of the highest point in the Uplands, the Donnersberg (686.5 m). North of Kirchheimbolanden, near Orbis (327 m), it leaves the Palatinate between the source of the Selz, which flows into the Upper Rhine, and the upper reaches of the Nahe tributary, the Wiesbach, and heads into the region of Rheinhessen.

== Elevations ==
In the south the Palatine Watershed lies below 500 m, its highest point being in the central Palatine Forest northwest of the Hortenkopf at 591 m and in the vicinity of Eschkopf and Mosisberg, in both cases reaching 596m above NHN. The two branches further north vary considerably in height: the western branch lies well under 500 m. The northern branch reaches more than 600 m at the Donnersberg, from where its elevation reduces on the last 8 kilometres to the Rheinhessian border still at an elevation of 300 m. -->
