= Holzland (Palatinate) =

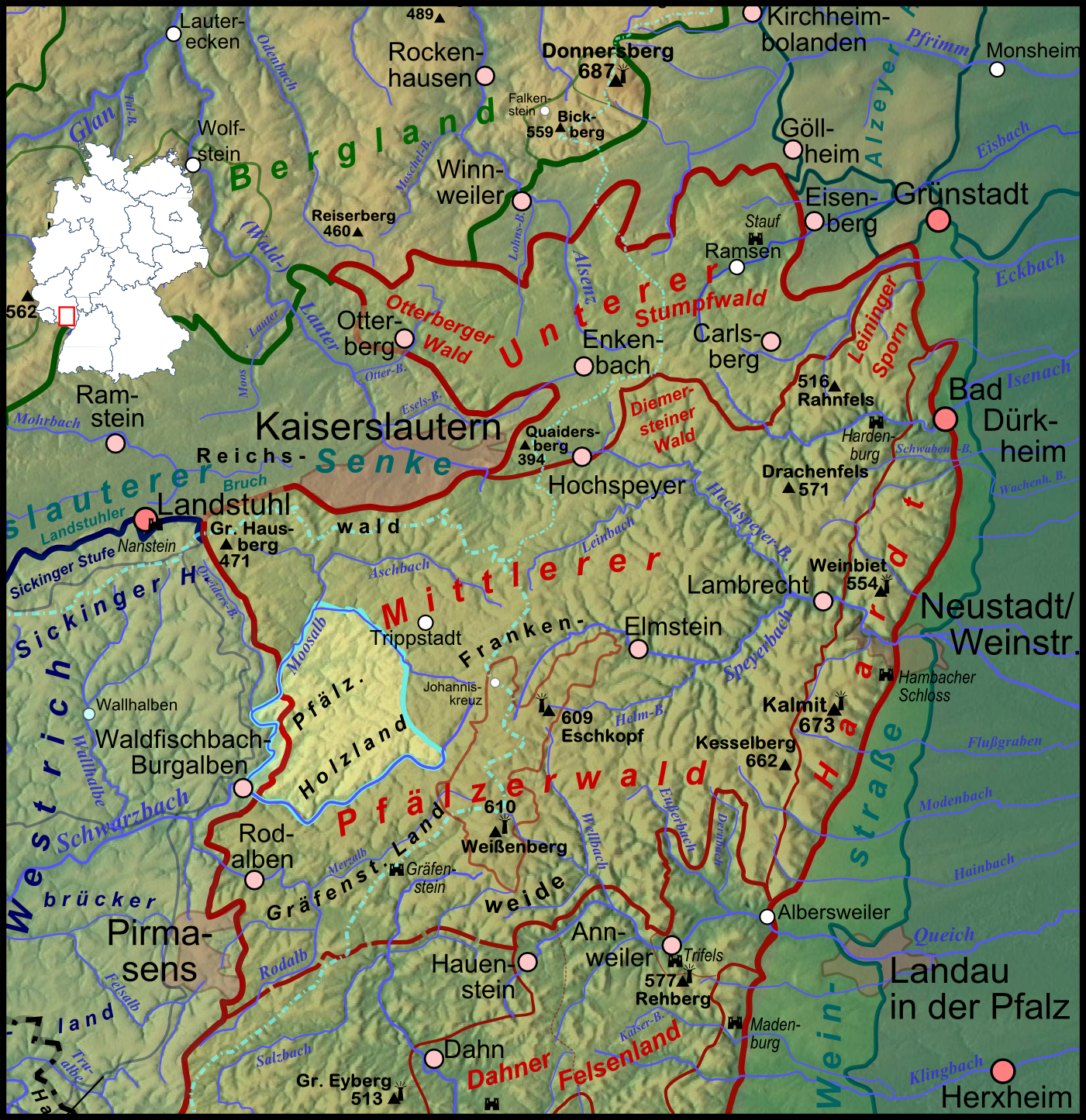
The Holzland (orange) within the Palatine Forest

Holzland is the name of a region in the western part of the Palatine Forest in the German state of Rhineland-Palatinate
