= Wellbach =

River in Germany

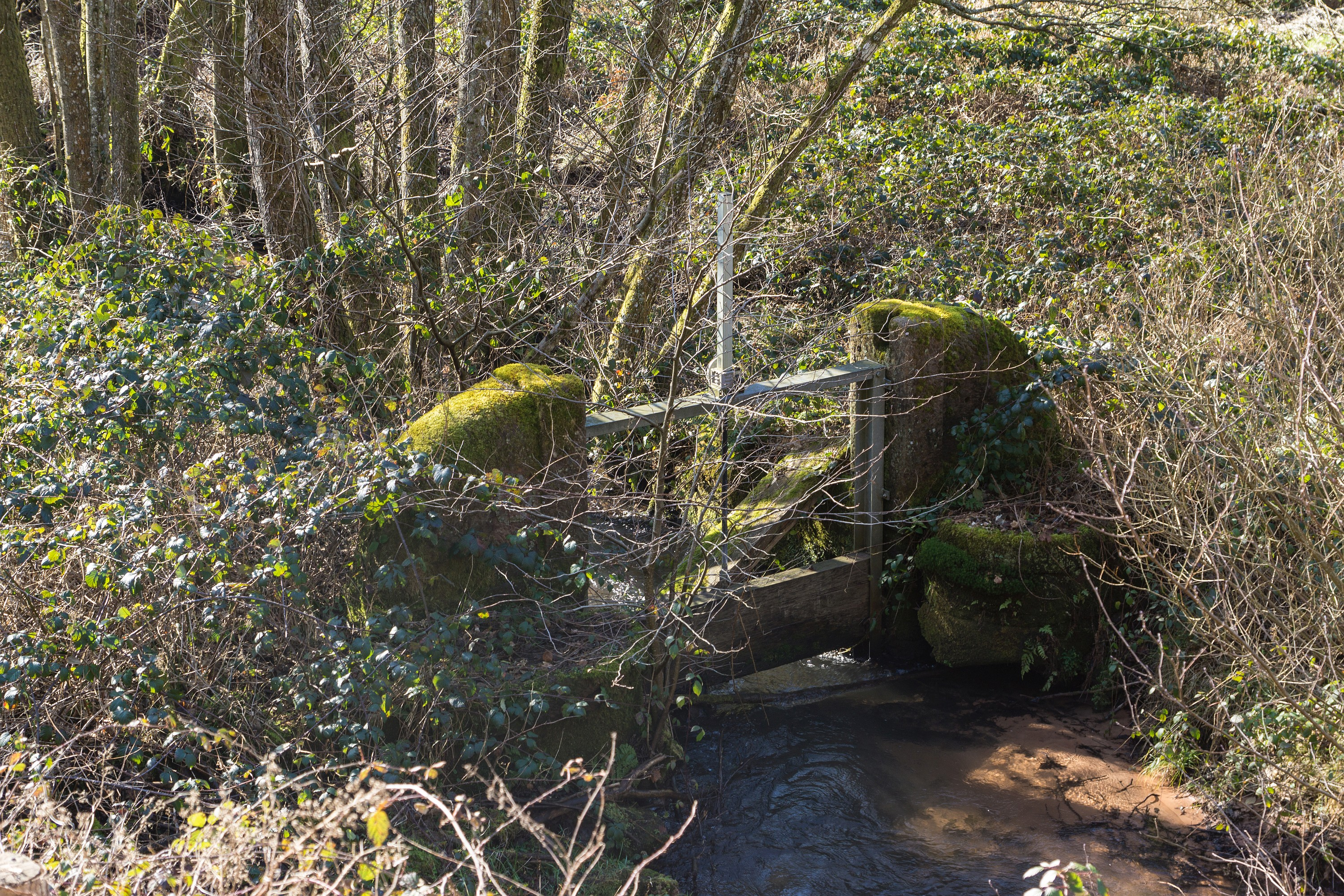
- Weir at the Wellbach

Location
- Country: Germany
- State: Rhineland-Palatinate

Physical characteristics
- Source
  - location: Near Eschkopf in the Palatine Forest
  - coordinates: 49°18′33″N 7°52′01″E
  - elevation: ca. 490 m above sea level (NN)
- Mouth
  - location: Bei Rinnthal
  - coordinates: 49°13′27″N 7°54′52″E
  - elevation: ca. 192 m above sea level (NN)
- Length: 12.8 km (8.0 mi)

Basin features
- Progression: Queich→ Rhine→ North Sea

The Wellbach is a 13-kilometre-long (8.1 mi) stream in the Palatine Forest in Germany. It rises near Eschkopf and flows towards the south. In doing so, it passes the eastern edge of Hofstätten (Pfalz) in the municipality of Wilgartswiesen. It then flows under the B 10 federal highway before discharging into the Queich, as its largest tributary.

The B 48 follows the stream for its entire length.

In its upper reaches, the Wellbach forms a municipal boundary, in places, of the town of Landau, which owns extensive areas of woodland in the Palatine Forest.

== See also ==
- List of rivers of Rhineland-Palatinate
