= Bloskülb =

- Location within Rhineland-Palatinate

Highest point
- Elevation: 570 m above sea level (NN) (1,870 ft)
- Coordinates: 49°20′00″N 7°54′00″E

Geography
- Location: Palatine Forest

The Bloskülb is a 570-metre-high hill in the central part of the Palatine Forest of Germany. It lies about three kilometres northwest of the village of Iggelbach. It is located entirely within the territory of the municipality of Elmstein.
