= Burrweiler =

- Municipality
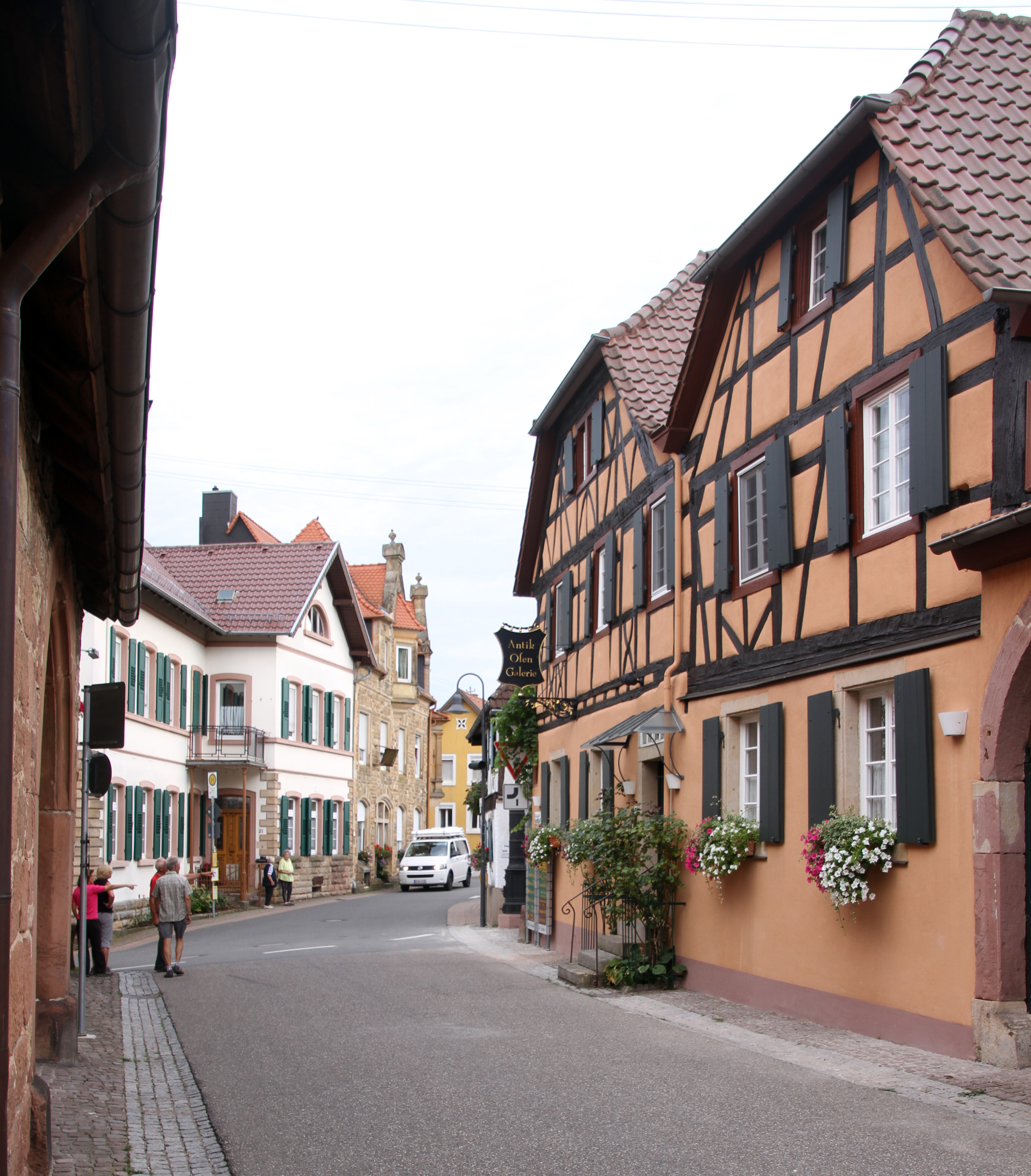
- Mainstreet-Winestreet

- Coat of arms

- Location of Burrweiler within Südliche Weinstraße district
- Interactive map of Burrweiler
- Location within Germany Location within Rhineland-Palatinate
- Coordinates: 49°14′57″N 8°4′32″E
- Country: Germany
- State: Rhineland-Palatinate
- District: Südliche Weinstraße
- Municipal assoc.: Edenkoben

Government
  - Mayor (2019–24): Christian Weber

Area
  - Total: 6.29 km^{2} (2.43 sq mi)
- Elevation: 246 m (807 ft)

Population (2025-12-31)
  - Total: 768
  - Density: 122/km^{2} (316/sq mi)
- Time zone: UTC+01:00 (CET)
  - Summer (DST): UTC+02:00 (CEST)
- Postal codes: 76835
- Dialling codes: 06345
- Vehicle registration: SÜW
- Website: www.burrweiler.de

Burrweiler is a municipality in the Südliche Weinstraße district, in Rhineland-Palatinate, Germany.

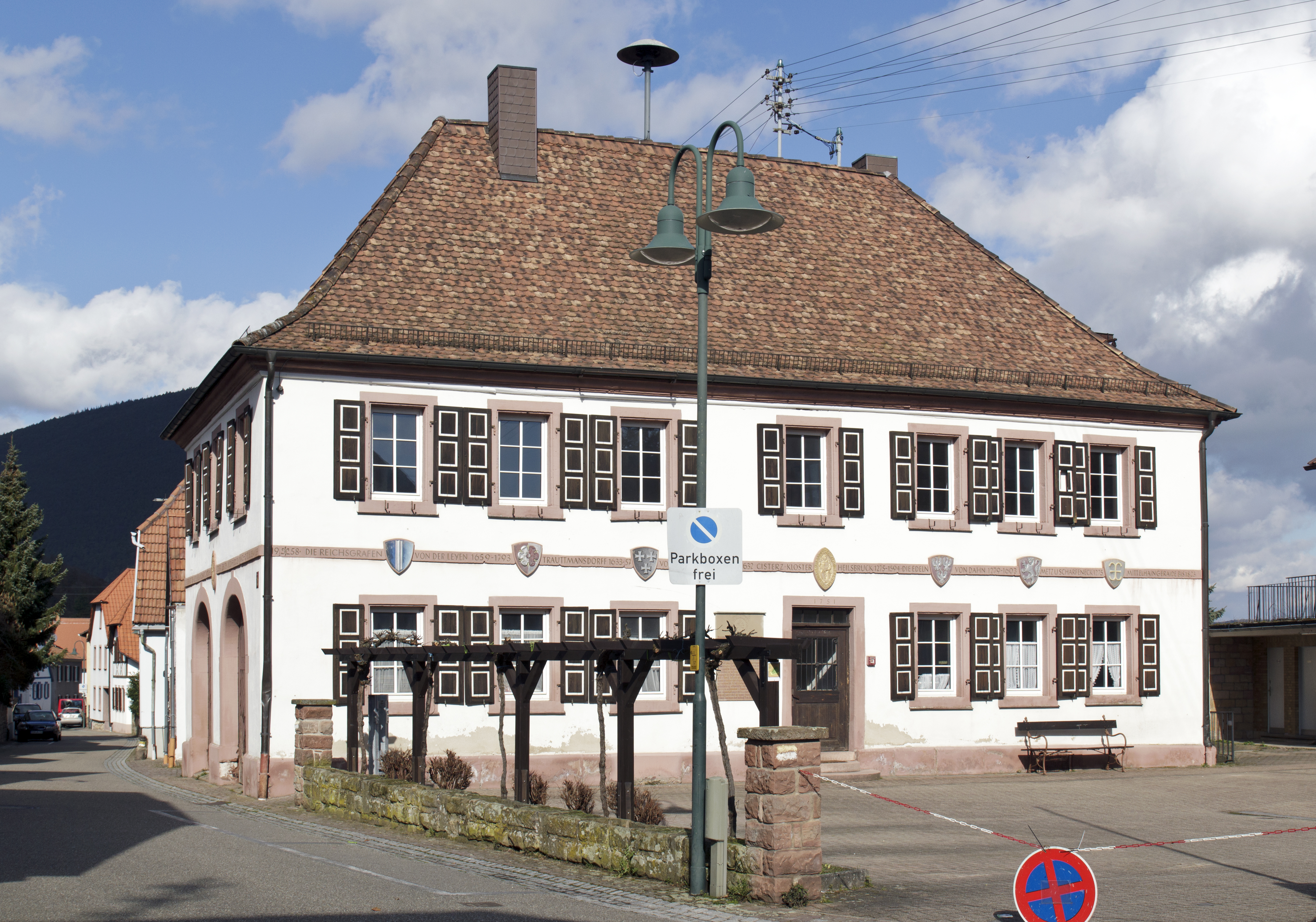
Rathaus ("Town Hall")
