= Eschkopf =

German hill

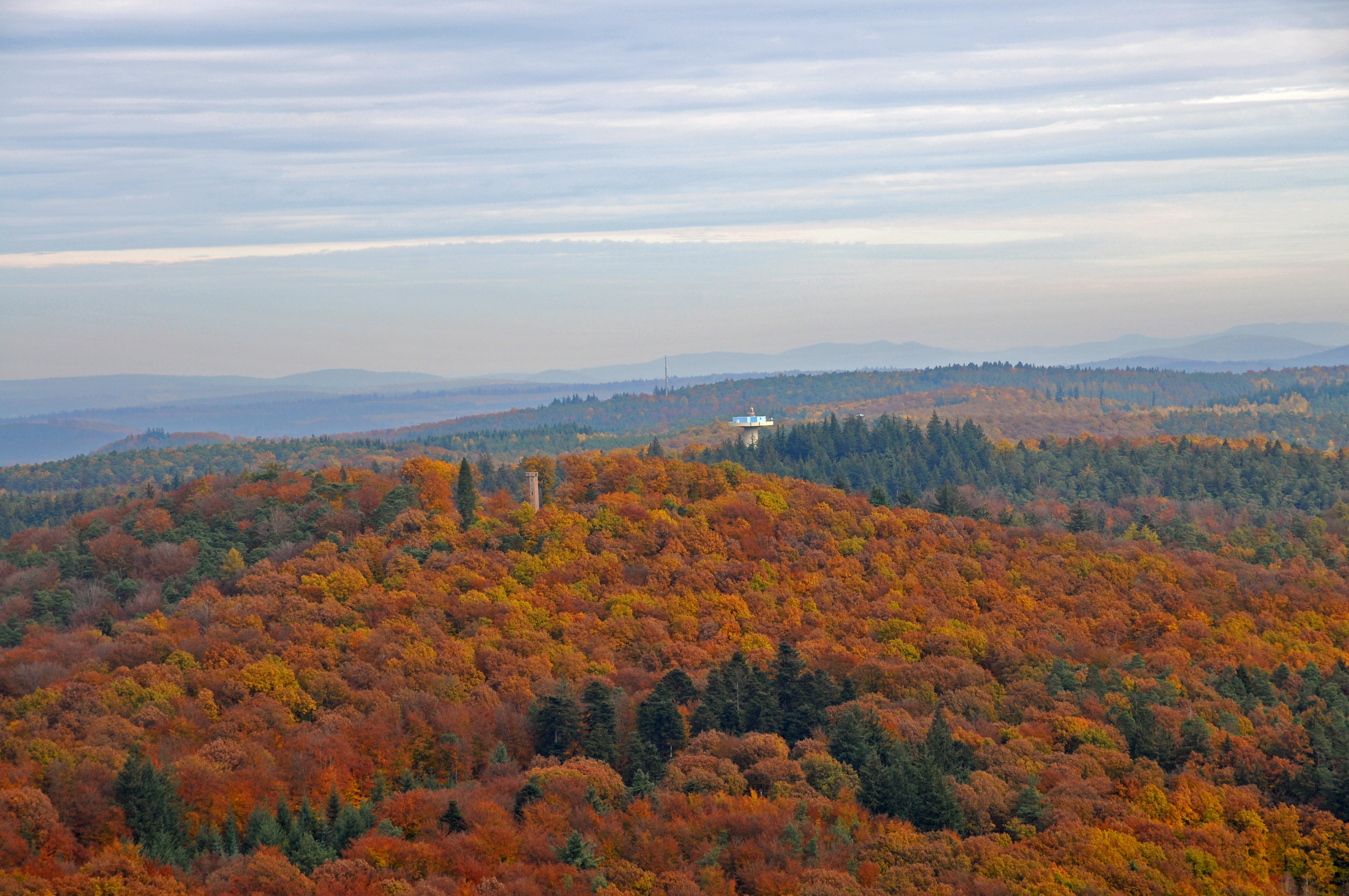
- Summit of the Eschkopf with the Eschkopf Tower. Behind: the radar installation of Pfälzer Wald

Highest point
- Elevation: 608.3 m above sea level (NHN) (1,996 ft)
- Prominence: 38 m
- Isolation: 13.9 km
- Coordinates: 49°18′37″N 7°51′13″E

Geography
- Location within Rhineland-Palatinate
- Location: near Hofstätten; Südwestpfalz, Rhineland-Palatinate Germany
- Parent range: Palatine Forest
- Biome: part of the Palatine Watershed

Geology
- Rock age: about 251–243 MYA
- Mountain type(s): Sandstone: rocks of the Lower and Middle Bunter

The Eschkopf near Hofstätten in the German state of Rhineland-Palatinate (Südwestpfalz county) is a major hill, 608.3 m above sea level (NHN) high in the Palatine Forest.

== Location ==
The Eschkopf is part of the Frankenweide, a rock massif in the centre of the Palatine Forest. The main Palatine Watershed runs over its summit, which rises about 3.4 km south of the village of Hofstätten (Südwestpfalz county) and 3.6 km (both as the crow flies) south-southeast of the hamlet of Johanniskreuz in the neighbouring county of Kaiserslautern. The hill is the northernmost of a line of four peaks that exceed 600 m. To the south, in sequence, are the Mosisberg (608.9 m), the Hortenkopf (606.2 m) and the Weißenberg (ca. 610 m). From the Eschkopf it is possible to walk to Leimen, Kaiserslautern-Mölschbach, Elmstein and via the forester's lodges of Taubensuhl and Heldenstein almost as far as Neustadt an der Weinstraße on continuous hill ridges without dropping below the 450 metre contour line.

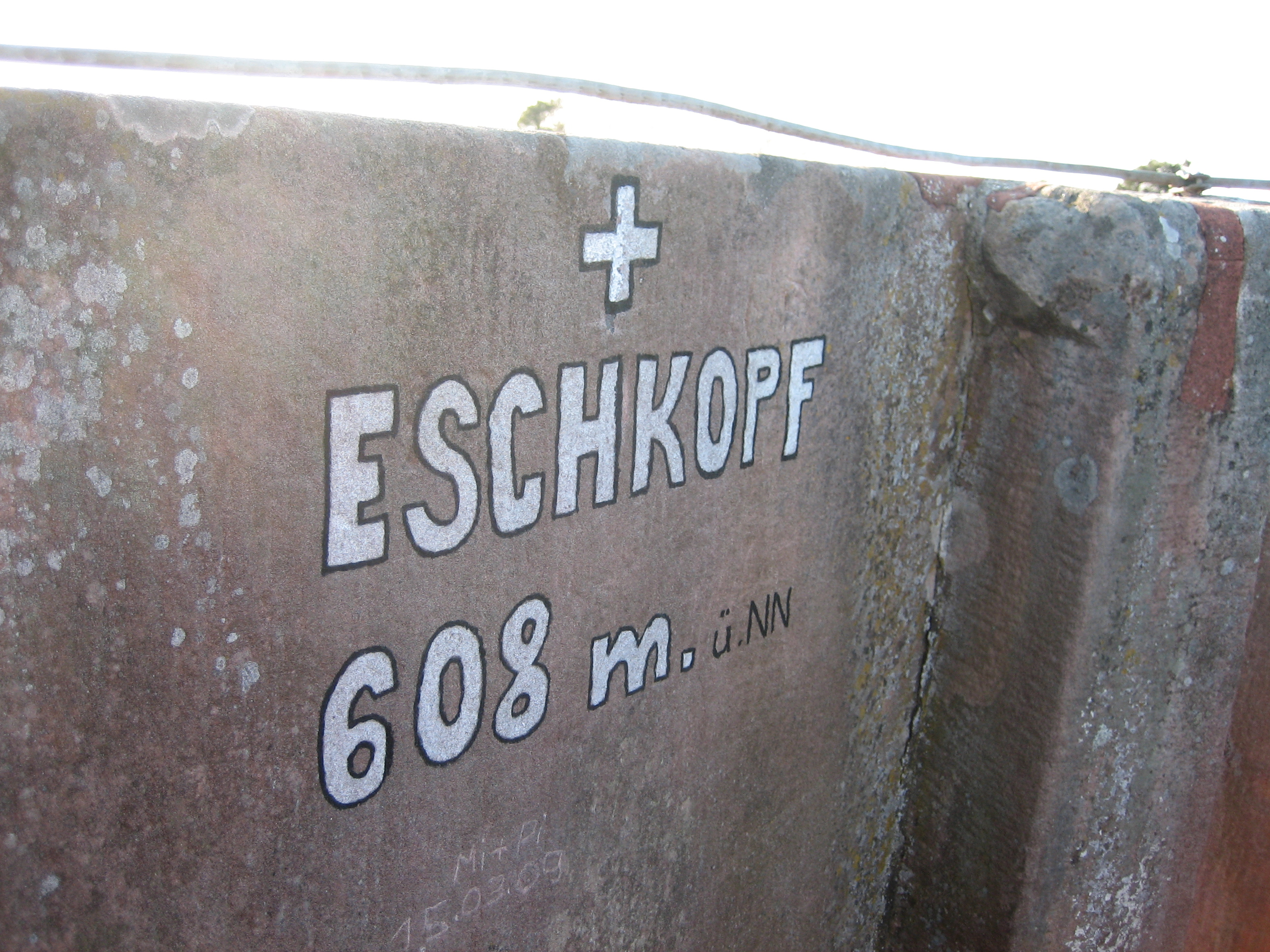
Inscription on the viewing platform of the Eschkopf Tower
