= Leimen, Rhineland-Palatinate =

Leimen
- Municipality
- Coat of arms

- Location of Leimen within Südwestpfalz district
- Interactive map of Leimen
- Location within Germany Location within Rhineland-Palatinate
- Coordinates: 49°16′34″N 7°46′12″E
- Country: Germany
- State: Rhineland-Palatinate
- District: Südwestpfalz
- Municipal assoc.: Rodalben
- Subdivisions: 2

Government
  - Mayor (2019–24): Alexander Frey

Area
  - Total: 29.23 km^{2} (11.29 sq mi)
- Elevation: 459 m (1,506 ft)

Population (2025-12-31)
  - Total: 911
  - Density: 31.2/km^{2} (80.7/sq mi)
- Time zone: UTC+01:00 (CET)
  - Summer (DST): UTC+02:00 (CEST)
- Postal codes: 66978
- Dialling codes: 06397
- Vehicle registration: PS
- Website: www.leimen-pfalz.de

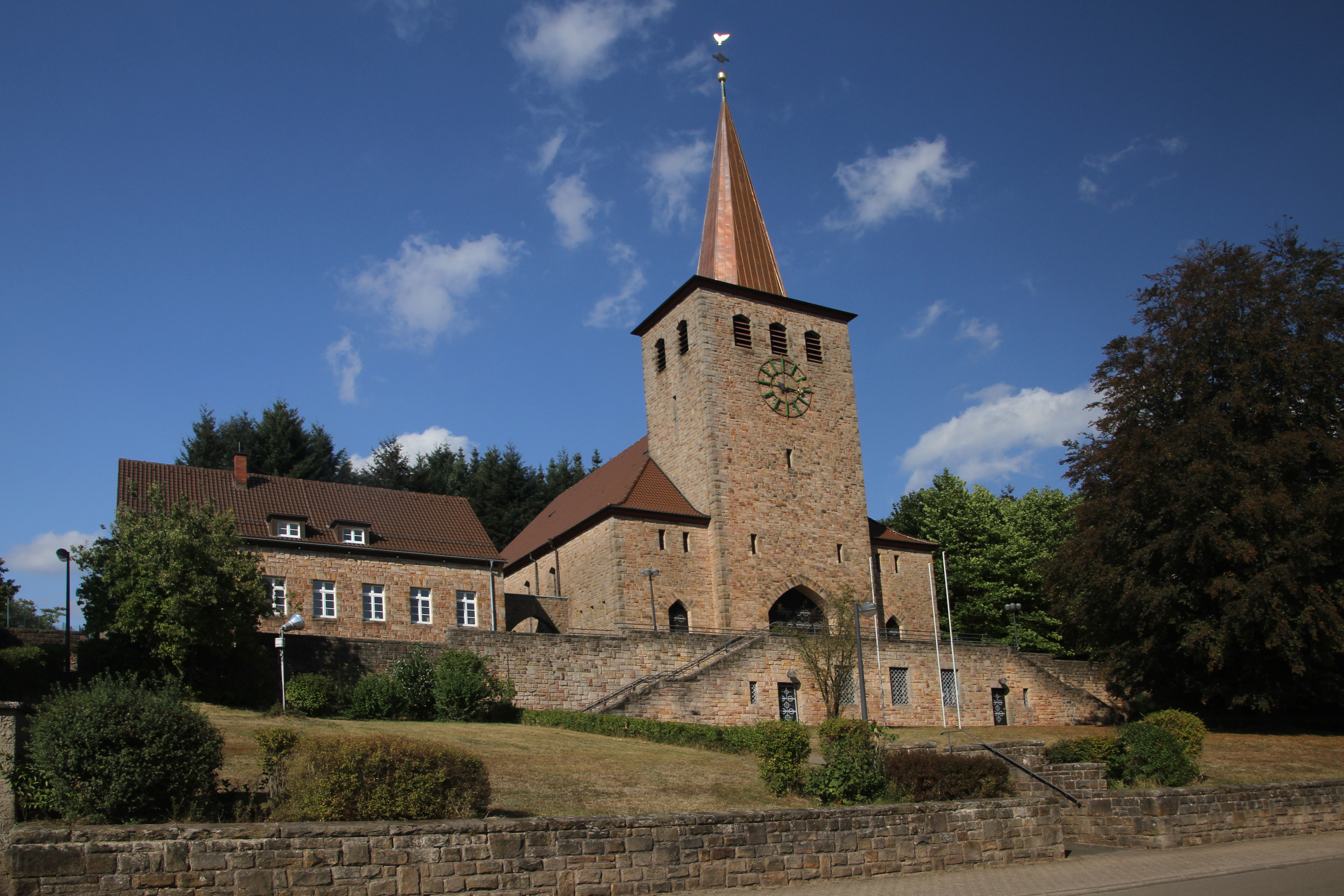
St. Katharina

Leimen (German pronunciation: [ˈlaɪmən]) is a municipality in the district of Südwestpfalz in the German state of Rhineland-Palatinate. It is located between the cities of Kaiserslautern and Pirmasens, and is situated in the heart of the Pfaelzerwald (Palatinate Forest). Leimen belongs to the municipal association of Rodalben.

Leimen was founded before 1152 under the auspices of the Benedictine cloister of Herbitzheim. Possession of Leimen later passed to the Counts of Leiningen, who administered the region from their seat at Gräfenstein Castle.
